= Lemrabott El Hacen =

Mauritanian footballer (born 1997)

Personal information
- Full name: Lemrabott El Hacen
- Date of birth: 24 March 1997 (age 29)
- Place of birth: Sebkha, Mauritania
- Height: 1.71 m (5 ft 7 in)
- Position: Defender

Team information
- Current team: Nouadhibou
- Number: 24

Senior career*
Years	Team	Apps	(Gls)
2016–2020	Nouadhibou		
2021	Al-Khaldiya		
2021	Nouakchott Kings		
2022	Tevragh-Zeina		
2022–	Nouadhibou		

International career
2017–2021	Mauritania	9	(0)
- * Club domestic league appearances and goals

Lemrabott El Hacen (Arabic: الحسن لمرابط; born 24 March 1997) is a Mauritanian professional footballer who plays as a defender for Super D1 club FC Nouadhibou.

== Honours ==
Nouadhibou

- Super D1: 2017–18, 2018–19, 2019–20, 2022–23, 2023–24, 2024–25
- Mauritanian President's Cup: 2017, 2018, 2023
- Mauritanian Super Cup: 2018
