= 2018 Coupe du Président de la République =

Tournament details
- Country: Mauritania

Final positions
- Champions: FC Nouadhibou
- Runners-up: Nouakchott Kings

The 2018 Coupe du Président de la République is the 41st edition of the Coupe du Président de la République, the knockout football competition of Mauritania.

== Preliminary round 1 ==
3 February 2018	FC Koussi	0–2	FC Jedida (Aleg)

3 February 2018	FC Ouadane	1–3	FC Tawaz (Atar)

3 February 2018	Fondation SNIM (Nouadhibou)	1–0	Club Sahel

5 February 2018	Widad Arafat	3–2	AS Armée

6 February 2018	JAHE Jeunesse d'El Mina	6–1	ASC Riadh

6 February 2018	FC Oasis	1–0	FC Toujounine

== Preliminary round 2 ==
24 February 2018	FC Jedida (Aleg)	2–0	Club Sportif de Sélibaby

25 February 2018	FC Tawaz	2–3	Fondation SNIM

26 February 2018	FC Oasis	1–1 (4–3 p)	JAHE Jeunesse d'El Mina

Widad Arafat bye

== Round 1 ==
First level teams enter in round 1.

11 April 2018	FC Oasis	0–3	FC Tevragh-Zeina

11 April 2018	FC Nouadhibou	2–0	AJ Riadh

Bye:

- FC Jedida (Aleg)
- Fondation SNIM
- Widad Arafat
- ASC Kédia
- ASC SNIM
- Kaédi FC
- FC Teïssir
- ASC Tidjikja
- AS Garde
- FC Deuz
- Nouakchott Kings
- ASC Police
- ACS Ksar
- ASAC Concorde

== Round of 16 ==
18 April 2018	ASC Kédia	1–1 (2–3 p)	Nouakchott Kings

19 April 2018	ASAC Concorde	12–2	FC Jedida (Aleg)

20 April 2018	FC Nouadhibou	6–0	FC Teïssir

20 April 2018	AS Garde	1–1 (4–3 p)	ASC SNIM

20 April 2018	Kaédi FC	6–3	Fondation SNIM

21 April 2018	ACS Ksar	0–0 (3–1 p)	FC Tevragh-Zeina

21 April 2018	FC Deuz	3–2	Widad Arafat

28 April 2018	ASC Tidjikja	1–2	ASC Police

== Quarter-finals ==
28 May 2010	ASC Police	0–1	ACS Ksar

28 May 2018	AS Garde	0–0 (2–4 p)	Nouakchott Kings

29 May 2018	FC Deuz	0–3	ASAC Concorde

29 Mayor 2018	FC Nouadhibou	7–1	Kaédi FC

== Semi-finals ==
6 June 2018	ASAC Concorde	2–3	Nouakchott Kings

7 June 2018	ACS Ksar	0–0 (4–5 p)	FC Nouadhibou

== Final ==
9 November 2018

FC Nouadhibou	1–1	Nouakchott Kings
Penalties
	6–5

Stade Cheikha Ould Boïdiya, Nouakchott

== See also ==
- 2017–18 Ligue 1 Mauritania
