= List of football clubs in Mauritania =

The following is an incomplete list of association football clubs based in Mauritania.

For a complete list see Category:Football clubs in Mauritania

== A ==
- ASAC Concorde (Nouakchott)
- ACAS de Teyarett
- ASC Dar El Barka
- ASC Dar Naïm (Nouakchott)
- ASC El Ahmedi FC de Sebkha (Nouakchott)
- ASC Imraguens
- ASC Kédia (Zouérate)
- ACS Ksar (Nouakchott)
- ASC Mauritel Mobile FC (Nouakchott)
- ASC Nasr de Sebkha (Nouakchott)
- ASC Police
- ASC Tevragh-Zeïna

== C ==
- CF Cansado (Nouadhibou)

== N ==
- Nouadhibou
