= Ely Cheikh Voulany =

Mauritanian footballer

Personal information
- Full name: Ely Cheikh Ould Samba El Voulany
- Date of birth: 31 December 1988 (age 37)
- Place of birth: Nouakchott, Mauritania
- Height: 1.85 m (6 ft 1 in)
- Position: Forward

Team information
- Current team: Shabaab al Jabal

Youth career
- Garde Nationale

Senior career*
Years	Team	Apps	(Gls)
2005–2008	ACS Ksar		
2009	Nasr de Sebkha		
2010–2016	Tevragh-Zeina		(30)
2015	→ Al-Nahda (loan)		(9)
2017–2019	Nouadhibou		(0)
2019	Al-Talaba		(1)
2019–2020	Nouadhibou		(0)
2020	Al-Minaa		(0)
2020–2021	Wej		(3)
2021	Kumait		(3)
2021–2022	ASAC Concorde		
2022–	Shabaab al Jabal		

International career^{‡}
2008–2018	Mauritania	28	(3)
- * Club domestic league appearances and goals ‡ National team caps and goals as of 24 March 2018

Ely Cheikh Voulany (born 31 December 1988) is a Mauritanian footballer who plays as a forward for Libyan club Shabaab al Jabal and the Mauritania national team.

== Club career ==
Voulany started playing with Garde Nationale, then moved to ACS Ksar and played for them for two seasons, then moved to Nasr de Sebkha.

In the 2010 season, Voulany moved to play with Tevragh-Zeina, and in his first season he was able to win the Mauritanian President's Cup with them and scored one of the winning goals in the final, which was the club's first title in this tournament. In his second season with the team in 2011, Voulany returned to give Tevragh-Zeina its second title in the same tournament, and scored one of the winning goals in the final also against his former team, ACS Ksar. In his third season with the team in 2012, Voulany returned to help his Tevragh-Zeina team win its first title as Mauritanian Premier League. After the 2014 season, Voulany became the top scorer in the Mauritanian league for three consecutive seasons, and Egyptian and Moroccan clubs began trying to sign him. After a crisis between the team's coach and most of its stars, the club loaned Voulany to the Omani club Al-Nahda in January 2015 for a period of five months with an option to purchase.

Voulany played with Al-Nahda and contributed his goals to the team in the Oman Professional League and the AFC Cup. He was able to score 5 goals in the first 6 matches. After the end of the season, Al-Nahda decided to abandon Voulany and not renew his loan or obtain his contract permanently. After returning to his team, Tevragh-Zeina, he was able to win the Mauritanian Premier League title with them for the 2016 season.

Voulany signed a one-year deal with Nouadhibou on 17 August 2017. In his first match with the team in the league, he was able to score two goals to lead his team to a 2–0 victory against ASAC Concorde and obtain the first 3 points. At the end of the season, he won the Premier League title with them. The team also relied a lot on the player in the 2018 CAF Confederation Cup due to his goals that either won the team or saved it from losing in several matches in the tournament.

Voulany also played professionally in the Iraqi Premier League. Where he moved to the Iraqi club Al-Talaba on September 25, 2019, and then on February 25, 2020, he moved to the Iraqi club Al-Minaa. He also later became a professional in the Saudi Arabia, where he moved on September 24, 2020, to the Saudi club Wej. And on January 30, 2021, he moved to Kumait.

== International career ==
Voulany was called up to the Mauritania national team for the first time for the 2010 FIFA World Cup qualification. He started in Mauritania's opening match against Ethiopia.

=== International goals ===
Scores and results list Mauritania's goal tally first.

No.	Date	Venue	Opponent	Score	Result	Competition
1.	22 June 2008	Addis Ababa Stadium, Addis Ababa, Ethiopia	Ethiopia	1–1	1–6	2010 FIFA World Cup qualification
2.	18 January 2014	Peter Mokaba Stadium, Polokwane, South Africa	Burundi	1–0	2–3	2014 African Nations Championship
3.	24 March 2018	Stade Cheikha Ould Boïdiya, Nouakchott, Mauritania	Guinea	2–0	2–0	Friendly match

== Honours ==
Tevragh-Zeina

- Super D1: 2012, 2016
- Mauritanian President's Cup: 2010, 2011, 2012, 2016
- Mauritanian Super Cup: 2010, 2016

Nouadhibou

- Super D1: 2017–18, 2018–19
- Mauritanian President's Cup: 2018
- Mauritanian Super Cup: 2018

Individual

- Super D1 top scorer (Golden Boot): 2007–08, 2011–12, 2012–13, 2013–14
