= 2014–15 Mauritanian Premier League =

Mauritanian football league season

The 2014–15 Mauritanian Premier League season was the 35th season of the premier association football league in Mauritania.

Tevragh-Zeina won their second title after defeating Sélibaby at the Olympic Stadium in Nouakchott.

== Teams ==
A total of 14 teams contest the league, including 12 sides from the 2013–14 season and two promoted from the 2013–14 second division.

== League table ==
Pos	Team	Pld	W	D	L	GF	GA	GD	Pts	Qualification or relegation
1	Tevragh-Zeina	26	18	6	2	52	14	+38	60	Qualification to CAF Champions League
2	Cansado	26	18	5	3	54	18	+36	59	
3	Ksar	26	16	8	2	54	13	+41	56	
4	Concorde	26	15	6	5	48	20	+28	51	
5	Nouadhibou	26	14	6	6	44	17	+27	48	
6	Tidjikja	26	11	6	9	36	32	+4	39	
7	Armée	26	8	9	9	35	34	+1	33	
8	Zouérate Kédia	26	7	8	11	26	42	−16	29	
9	Ittihad Assaba	26	7	6	13	17	34	−17	27	
10	Gueumeul	26	6	9	11	23	27	−4	27	
11	Zem Zem	26	6	8	12	18	33	−15	26	
12	Police	26	6	6	14	32	45	−13	24	
13	Moderne Kaédi	26	4	4	18	20	58	−38	16	Relegation to second division
14	Sélibaby	26	1	3	22	13	85	−72	6	Relegation to second division
