= 2024–25 Ligue 1 Mauritania =

Ligue 1 Mauritania season

Super D1
- Season: 2024–2025
- Dates: 14 September 2024 – 30 May 2025
- Champions: FC Nouadhibou (13th title); Al-Hilal (1st title)

The 2024–25 Super D1 season is the 45th season of the premier association football league in Mauritania.

FC Nouadhibou was the defending champion, having decisively won their record-extending twelfth title after defeating runner-ups AS Douanes the previous season. They retained their title with a record-breaking 13th league championship, as shared Sudanese team Al-Hilal are winner of the title as guests.

== Teams ==
A total of 16 teams are taking part in the league, including the top 12 sides from the 2023–24 season, two promoted from the 2023–24 season of the Super D2 second division league, and two Sudanese clubs displaced by the Sudanese civil war.

=== Team changes ===
Promoted from Super D2	Relegated to Super D2
ASC Toulde; FC N'Zidane	ASAC Concorde; AS Entou de Kiffa

=== Stadiums and Location ===
Team	Location	Stadium	Capacity
Al Hilal	Omdurman (Sudan)	Cheikha Ould Boïdiya Stadium (Note: Al Hilal play their home matches at Cheikha Ould Boïdiya Stadium in Nouakchott (Mauritania), instead of their regular stadium, Al-Hilal Stadium, Omdurman, due to the Sudanese civil war.)	8,200
Al Merrikh	Omdurman (Sudan)	Cheikha Ould Boïdiya Stadium (Note: Al Merrikh play their home matches at Cheikha Ould Boïdiya Stadium in Nouakchott (Mauritania), instead of their regular stadium, Al-Merrikh Stadium, Omdurman, due to the Sudanese civil war.)	8,200
AS Douanes	Nouakchott	Cheikha Ould Boïdiya Stadium	8,200
AS Garde Nationale	Nouakchott	Nouakchott Olympic Stadium	20,000
AS Pompier	Nouakchott	Cheikha Ould Boïdiya Stadium	8,200
ASC GENDRIM	Nouakchott	Cheikha Ould Boïdiya Stadium	8,200
ASC Ksar	Nouakchott	Nouakchott Olympic Stadium	20,000
ASC SNIM	Nouadhibou	Nouadhibou Municipal Stadium	10,000
ASC Toulde	Kaédi	Kaédi Stadium	5,000
Chemal FC	Nouakchott	Nouakchott Olympic Stadium	20,000
FC Nouadhibou	Nouadhibou	Nouadhibou Municipal Stadium	10,000
FC N'Zidane	Atar	Stade d'Atar	2,000
FC Tevragh-Zeina	Nouakchott	Nouakchott Olympic Stadium	20,000
Inter Nouakchott	Nouakchott	Cheikha Ould Boïdiya Stadium	8,200
Kaédi FC	Kaédi	Kaédi Stadium	5,000
Nouakchott Kings	Nouakchott	Nouakchott Olympic Stadium	20,000

== League table ==
Pos	Team	Pld	W	D	L	GF	GA	GD	Pts	Qualification or relegation
1	Al Hilal	30	20	7	3	55	18	+37	67	
2	FC Nouadhibou (C, Q)	30	17	10	3	37	13	+24	61	Qualification to CAF Champions League
3	Chemal FC	30	14	9	7	37	23	+14	51	
4	Nouakchott Kings	30	12	14	4	36	25	+11	50	
5	AS Douanes	30	12	13	5	39	30	+9	49	
6	Al Merrikh	30	12	8	10	36	28	+8	44	
7	FC Tevragh-Zeina	30	11	10	9	35	26	+9	43	
8	AS Pompier	30	9	11	10	31	30	+1	38	
9	Inter Nouakchott	30	9	10	11	31	37	−6	37	
10	Kaédi FC	30	9	9	12	37	49	−12	36	
11	ASC GENDRIM	30	9	7	14	24	35	−11	34	
12	ASC SNIM	30	8	8	14	24	28	−4	32	
13	N'Zidane	30	6	12	12	31	42	−11	30	
14	ACS Ksar	30	7	8	15	19	31	−12	29	
15	AS Garde Nationale (R)	30	7	6	17	24	44	−20	27	Relegation to Super D2
16	Toulde (R)	30	4	6	20	17	54	−37	18	Relegation to Super D2

(C) Champions; (Q) Qualified for the phase indicated; (R) Relegated
