= Mohamedhen Beibou =

Mauritanian footballer (born 1995)

Personal information
- Full name: Mohamedhen Beibou
- Date of birth: 5 December 1995 (age 30)
- Place of birth: Tevragh-Zeina, Mauritania
- Height: 1.77 m (5 ft 10 in)
- Position: Left-back

Team information
- Current team: Nouadhibou

Senior career*
| Years | Team | Apps | (Gls) |
| 2017– | Nouadhibou | | |

International career^{‡}
| 2021– | Mauritania | 9 | (0) |
- * Club domestic league appearances and goals ‡ National team caps and goals as of 17:38, 22 July 2025 (UTC)

Mohamedhen Beibou (Arabic: محمدهن بيبو; born 5 December 1995) is a Mauritanian professional footballer who plays as a left-back for Super D1 club Nouadhibou and the Mauritania national team.

== Honours ==
Nouadhibou

- Super D1: 2017–18, 2018–19, 2019–20, 2020–21, 2021–22, 2022–23, 2023–24, 2024–25
- Mauritanian President's Cup: 2017–18, 2022–23
- Mauritanian Super Cup: 2018
