= 2010–11 Mauritanian Premier League =

Mauritanian Premier League
- Season: 2010–11
- Champions: FC Nouadhibou

The 2010–11 Mauritanian Premier League was the 31st season of the Mauritanian Premier League, the top-level football championship of Mauritania. It began on 24 December 2010 and concluded on 18 June 2011 . CF Cansado are the defending champions.

== Teams ==
In comparison to the 2010 season, league size was decreased from twelve to nine teams for unknown reasons.

Dar El Naim and Dar El Barka were relegated to the second-level league after finishing the 2010 season at the bottom of the table. They were replaced by second-level champions ASC Police and ASC Imraguens.

=== List of participating teams ===
- ASAC Concorde (Nouakchott)
- ASC El Ahmedi (Nouakchott)
- ASC Imraguens
- ASC Kédia (Zouérate)
- ACS Ksar (Nouakchott)
- ASC Police
- ASC Tevragh-Zeïna
- CF Cansado (Nouadhibou)
- FC Nouadhibou ASJN (Nouadhibou)

== League table ==
Pos	Team	Pld	W	D	L	GF	GA	GD	Pts	Relegation
1	FC Nouadhibou	16	12	2	2	25	6	+19	38	
2	ASC Tevragh-Zeïna	16	12	2	2	25	7	+18	38	
3	ASC Concorde	16	9	1	6	26	16	+10	28	
4	CF Cansado	16	8	4	4	23	15	+8	28	
5	ACS Ksar	16	7	2	7	20	23	−3	23	
6	ASC Kédia	16	6	1	9	9	18	−9	19	
7	ASC Imraguens	16	4	2	10	13	27	−14	14	
8	ASC El Ahmedi	16	2	6	8	11	19	−8	12	
9	ASC Police (R)	16	1	2	13	5	26	−21	5	Relegation to Mauritanian second-level league

Updated to match(es) played on 18 July 2011. Source: fifa.com
Rules for classification: 1) points; 2) goal difference; 3) number of goals scored.
(R) Relegated
