= Moustapha Sall =

Mauritanian football manager and player (1967–2025)

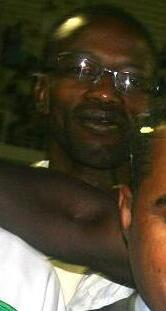
- Sall in 2010

Personal information
- Date of birth: 31 May 1967
- Place of birth: Nouakchott, Mauritania
- Date of death: 2 September 2025 (aged 58)
- Place of death: France
- Height: 1.82 m (6 ft 0 in)
- Positions: Midfielder; defender

Senior career*
Years	Team	Apps	(Gls)
1993–1994	ASC Sonader Ksar		
1995–1998	ASC Sonalec		
1999–2003	ASAC Concorde		

International career
1993	Mauritania		

Managerial career
- 2003–2004: ASAC Concorde
- 2004–2006: ASC Mauritel Mobile FC
- 2006–2007: Mauritania
- 2007–2010: ASAC Concorde
- 2010–2012: Mauritania
- 2013–2014: ACS Ksar
- 2014: Mauritania (caretaker)
- 2014–2021: Mauritania (assistant)
- 2015: Mauritania U23
- 2016: Mauritania U20 (caretaker)
- 2022–2023: Libya (assistant)
- 2024–2025: FC Nouadhibou
- * Club domestic league appearances and goals

Moustapha Sall (Arabic: مصطفى صال; 31 May 1967 – 2 September 2025), also known as Petit Sall, was a Mauritanian football manager and player. He was the manager of the national team from 2006 to 2007 and 2010 to 2012. He also served as assistant manager of the team under Corentin Martins from 2014 to 2021 during which the country made its first ever appearance at the Africa Cup of Nations in 2019.

As a player, Sall was considered one of the greatest footballers in the country's history, having been a part of four Mauritanian President's Cup–winning teams.

== Playing career ==
As a player for ASC Sonader Ksar, he scored the winning goal in a 1–0 victory over ASC Snim in the final of the 1993 Mauritanian President's Cup, held on 20 August 1993. That same year he represented Mauritania at the 1993 Amílcar Cabral Cup as a midfielder. In the final of the 1994 Mauritanian President's Cup, he again scored the winning goal in a 1–0 victory over ASC Police. In 1995, he joined ASC Sonalec and was a part of the 1997 and 1998 Mauritanian President's Cup winning teams. He was a defender at ASAC Concorde from 1999 to 2003.

== Managerial career ==
Sall coached ASAC Concorde from 2003 to 2004 and ASC Mauritel Mobile FC from 2004 to 2006. He assumed the role of manager of the national team in April 2006. Sall led Mauritania to their biggest ever victory, an 8–2 win over Somalia. Under his tenure, the team benefited from several expatriate players, such as Pascal Gourville, Abdelaziz Kamara, Moïse Kandé and Yoann Langlet. The Mauritanian newspaper Tahalil reported that the Mauritanian Football Federation (FFRIM) appeared to give preferential treatment to Algerian manager Ali Fergani, who was working with the team under an informal contract, noting that he received higher match fees and compensation than local managers. Sall resigned on 6 June 2007, during the 2008 Africa Cup of Nations qualifiers. This was reportedly due to unfavorable working conditions, inadequate training programs for local players, federation members interfering in team decisions, and recurring issues with match bonuses.

Sall became the manager of ASAC Concorde again in 2007 and helped them win their first championship title the following year. The FFRIM named him as the national team's manager again on 1 May 2010. In August 2010, Sall managed the team to a 0–0 draw against Palestine in a friendly match. He served as manager until February 2012, when he was succeeded by Patrice Neveu. On 29 July 2013, he became the manager of ACS Ksar. Neveu was dismissed after the team, which had reached the final knockout stage of the 2015 Africa Cup of Nations qualifiers due to Equatorial Guinea's disqualification, lost 3–0 on aggregate to Uganda. In a FFRIM press release on 9 September 2014, it was announced that Sall would serve as the national team's provisional manager in the lead up to a friendly match against Morocco on 12 October. The team's new manager, Corentin Martins, had been announced a few days before the match and was in attendance as Morocco defeated Mauritania 5–0.

Sall managed the Mauritania national under-23 football team at the 2015 U-23 Africa Cup of Nations qualifiers in which they drew 1–1 with Mali, but lost 3–1 in the playoff. He and Oumar N'Diaye temporarily took charge of the Mauritania national under-20 football team for a friendly match against Saudi Arabia on 21 December 2016 in Jeddah. Sall also served as the national team's assistant manager during Martins' seven-year tenure from 2014 to 2021, during which Mauritania qualified for the Africa Cup of Nations for the first time at the 2019 Africa Cup of Nations and again at the 2021 Africa Cup of Nations. He continued as Martins' assistant when the latter took charge of the Libya national football team for a year in 2022, ahead of the 2023 Africa Cup of Nations qualifiers.

After the dismissal of Spanish manager Francisco Javier Bernal García, FC Nouadhibou were unsuccessful in recruiting another manager from Spain and appointed Sall as manager on 3 October 2024. He held the position until 1 April 2025, when routine medical inspections "revealed the need for more in-depth examinations" in France. On 14 July 2025, he assumed the role of technical advisor at FC Nouadhibou.

Sall died of an illness on 2 September 2025, at the age of 58 in France.
