= 2022–23 Ligue 1 Mauritania =

Ligue 1 Mauritania season

Super D1
- Season: 2022–2023
- Champions: FC Nouadhibou
- Relegated: ASC Médine Trarza; ASC Police
- Champions League: FC Nouadhibou

The 2022–23 Super D1 season was the 43rd season of the premier association football league in Mauritania.

FC Nouadhibou decisively won their record-extending eleventh title after defeating runner-ups Chemal FC. This was the sixth consecutive year the team won the Super D1.

== Teams ==
A total of 14 teams took part in the league, including the top 12 sides from the 2021–22 season and two promoted from the 2021–22 season of the Super D2 second division league.

== League table ==
Pos	Team	Pld	W	D	L	GF	GA	GD	Pts	Qualification or relegation
1	FC Nouadhibou	26	22	3	1	59	16	+43	69	Qualification to CAF Champions League
2	Chemal FC	26	15	5	6	35	23	+12	50	
3	FC Tevragh-Zeina	26	14	6	6	31	17	+14	48	
4	AS Douanes	26	11	8	7	32	23	+9	41	
5	Kaédi FC	26	11	8	7	31	32	−1	41	
6	Nouakchott Kings	26	11	4	11	30	26	+4	37	
7	ASAC Concorde	26	9	6	11	28	29	−1	33	
8	AS Garde Nationale	26	9	5	12	29	33	−4	32	
9	ASC GENDRIM	26	7	8	11	16	24	−8	29	
10	Inter Nouakchott	26	7	7	12	23	27	−4	28	
11	ACS Ksar	26	6	10	10	21	29	−8	28	
12	ASC SNIM	26	5	12	9	20	24	−4	27	
13	ASC Médine Trarza	26	6	3	17	23	53	−30	21	Relegation to Super D2
14	ASC Police	26	4	5	17	13	35	−22	17	Relegation to Super D2
