= Nouh Mohamed El Abd =

Mauritanian footballer (born 2000)

Nouh Mohamed El Abd نوح محمد العبد
Personal information
- Date of birth: 24 December 2000 (age 25)
- Place of birth: Tevragh-Zeina, Mauritania
- Height: 1.86 m (6 ft 1 in)
- Position: Centre-back

Team information
- Current team: JS Kabylie
- Number: 23

Senior career*
Years	Team	Apps	(Gls)
2019–2020	Tevragh-Zeina		
2020–2025	Nouadhibou		
2025–2026	AS FAR	8	(0)
2026–	JS Kabylie	6	(0)

International career^{‡}
2022–	Mauritania	37	(1)
- * Club domestic league appearances and goals as of 15:10, 7 November 2026 (UTC) ‡ National team caps and goals as of 24 September 2026

Nouh Mohamed El Abd (Arabic: نوح محمد العبد; Tamazight: ⵏⵓⵀ ⵎⵓⵀⴰⵎⴻⴷ ⴻⵍ ⴰⴱⴷ; born 24 December 2000), is a Mauritanian professional footballer who plays as a centre-back for JS Kabylie and the Mauritania national team.

== Club career ==
El Abd began his senior career in his local club Tevragh-Zeina in the Super D1 in 2019 and helped them win the 2020 Mauritanian President's Cup. On 2 November 2020, he moved to Nouadhibou on a 2-year contract and helped them win 5 consecutive Super D1 titles.

On 24 July 2026, he joined JS Kabylie, signing a two-year contract with the Kabyle club.

== International career ==
El Abd was first called up to the Mauritania national team for the 2022 African Nations Championship. He was called up to the national team for the 2023 Africa Cup of Nations.

== Personal life ==
El Abd's younger brother Sidi Ahmed Mohamed El Abd is a professional footballer as well, and his teammate at the Mauritania national team.

== Honours ==
Tevragh-Zeina

- Mauritanian President's Cup: 2020

Nouadhibou

- Super D1: 2020–21, 2021–22, 2022–23, 2023–24, 2024–25
- Mauritanian President's Cup: 2023
