= Abdoulaye Gaye =

Mauritanian footballer

Personal information
- Full name: Abdoulaye Sileye Gaye
- Date of birth: 13 September 1991 (age 35)
- Place of birth: Nouakchott, Mauritania
- Height: 1.70 m (5 ft 7 in)
- Position: Midfielder

Team information
- Current team: FK Liepāja

Senior career*
Years	Team	Apps	(Gls)
2007–2010	ASAC Concorde		
2010–2011	Renova	8	(0)
2011–2013	ASAC Concorde		
2013–2015	ACS Ksar		
2015–2016	Tevragh-Zeina		
2016–2017	Nouadhibou		
2017–	Liepāja	0	(0)

International career^{‡}
2012–	Mauritania	30	(1)
- * Club domestic league appearances and goals as of 1 August 2017 ‡ National team caps and goals as of 18 March 2018

Abdoulaye Sileye Gaye (born 13 September 1991) is a Mauritanian footballer playing with FK Liepāja.

== Career ==
He was playing with ASAC Concorde before joining FK Renova in the Macedonian First Football League in the season 2010–11. After his spell in Macedonia, he returned to his homeland and continued playing with ASAC Concorde.

He has been a regular member of the Mauritania national football team since 2012.

=== International goals ===
Scores and results list Mauritania's goal tally first.

No.	Date	Venue	Opponent	Score	Result	Competition
1.	27 February 2013	Independence Stadium, Bakau, Gambia	Gambia	1–0	2–0	Friendly
2.	12 August 2017	Stade Olympique, Nouakchott, Mauritania	Mali	1–1	2–2	2018 African Nations Championship qualification

== Honours ==
ASAC Concorde

- Ligue 1 Mauritania: 2008
- Mauritanian Cup: 2009

ACS Ksar

- Mauritanian Cup: 2014, 2015

Tevragh-Zeina

- Ligue 1 Mauritania: 2016
- Mauritanian Cup: 2016
