= Boubacar Salahdine =

Mauritanian footballer

Personal information
- Full name: Mohamed Salahdine Boubacar Saleck
- Date of birth: 31 December 1997 (age 28)
- Place of birth: Mauritania
- Position: Goalkeeper

Team information
- Current team: Tevragh-Zeina

Senior career*
Years	Team	Apps	(Gls)
2015–2019	Tevragh-Zeina		
2019–2020	SONACOS		
2020	FC Alem		
2020–2022	Nouadhibou		
2022–2023	Douanes		
2023–2024	Majd		

International career^{‡}
2015–	Mauritania	3	(0)
- * Club domestic league appearances and goals as of 1:49, 1 May 2016 (UTC) ‡ National team caps and goals as of 6 October 2017

Mohamed Salahdine Boubacar Saleck (born 31 December 1997) is a Mauritanian footballer who plays as a goalkeeper for Tevragh-Zeina and the Mauritania national team.

== International career ==
Salahdine made his debut for Mauritania on 5 September 2015 against South Africa. He was included in Mauritania's squad for the 2018 African Nations Championship in Morocco.

== Career statistics ==
=== International ===
Statistics accurate as of match played 6 October 2016

Mauritania national team
Year	Apps	Goals
2015	1	0
2016	1	0
2017	1	0
Total	3	0

== Honours ==
- Ligue 1 Mauritania: winner (2015–16)
- Coupe du Président de la République: winner (2016)
