= Oumar Mangane =

Mauritanian footballer

Personal information
- Full name: Oumar Mamadou Mangane
- Date of birth: 31 December 1992 (age 33)
- Place of birth: Mauritania
- Height: 1.90 m (6 ft 3 in)
- Position: Centre-back

Team information
- Current team: Nouadhibou

Senior career*
Years	Team	Apps	(Gls)
2016–	Nouadhibou		

International career^{‡}
2018–	Mauritania	8	(0)
- * Club domestic league appearances and goals ‡ National team caps and goals as of 22:28, 25 December 2021 (UTC)

Oumar Mamadou Mangane (Arabic: عمر مامادو مانجان; born 31 December 1992) is a Mauritanian professional footballer who plays as a centre-back for Super D1 club Nouadhibou and the Mauritania national team.

== Honours ==
Nouadhibou

- Super D1: 2017–18, 2018–19, 2019–20, 2020–21
- Mauritanian President's Cup: 2016–17, 2017–18
- Mauritanian Super Cup: 2018
