= 2023–24 Ligue 1 Mauritania =

Ligue 1 Mauritania season

Super D1
- Season: 2023–2024
- Dates: 15 September 2023 – 5 June 2024
- Champions: FC Nouadhibou
- Relegated: ASAC Concorde; AS Entou de Kiffa
- Champions League: FC Nouadhibou
- Matches played: 182
- Goals scored: 433 (2.38 per match)
- Top goalscorer: Brahima Gadiaga

The 2023–24 Super D1 season was the 44th season of the premier association football league in Mauritania.

FC Nouadhibou decisively won their record-extending twelfth title after defeating runner-ups AS Douanes. This was the seventh consecutive year the team won the Super D1.

== Teams ==
A total of 14 teams took part in the league, including the top 12 sides from the 2022–23 season and two promoted from the 2022–23 season of the Super D2 second division league.

== League table ==
Pos	Team	Pld	W	D	L	GF	GA	GD	Pts	Qualification or relegation
1	FC Nouadhibou	26	21	3	2	48	14	+34	66	Qualification to CAF Champions League
2	AS Douanes	26	17	8	1	55	18	+37	59	
3	FC Tevragh-Zeina	26	15	7	4	43	15	+28	52	
4	ASC GENDRIM	26	11	7	8	25	24	+1	40	
5	Nouakchott Kings	26	9	9	8	39	32	+7	36	
6	Inter Nouakchott	26	8	7	11	29	34	−5	31	
7	AS Pompier	26	8	6	12	28	38	−10	30	
8	Kaédi FC	26	7	8	11	31	41	−10	29	
9	Chemal FC	26	6	10	10	26	27	−1	28	
10	AS Garde Nationale	26	6	10	10	24	32	−8	28	
11	ASC SNIM	26	5	11	10	22	34	−12	26	
12	ACS Ksar	26	6	8	12	17	33	−16	26	
13	ASAC Concorde	26	6	6	14	18	32	−14	24	Relegation to Super D2
14	AS Entou de Kiffa	26	3	8	15	28	59	−31	17	Relegation to Super D2

== Top goalscorers ==
Rank	Player	Team	Goals
1	(Mauritania) Brahima Gadiaga	Nouadhibou	12
2	(Senegal) Birama Gueye	Ksar	11
3	(Mauritania) Cheikh El Hattab	Tevragh Zeina	10
4	(Mauritania) Beyatt Leikwery	Douanes	9
4	(Senegal) Ousseynou Bodian	Douanes	9
