= Souleymane Diallo (footballer) =

Mauritanian footballer (born 1987)

Personal information
- Date of birth: 2 December 1987 (age 38) (Note: Some sources claim Diallo's date of birth is 22 May 1990.)
- Place of birth: Nouakchott, Mauritania
- Height: 1.79 m (5 ft 10 in)
- Position: Goalkeeper

Team information
- Current team: ASC Gendrim

Senior career*
Years	Team	Apps	(Gls)
2005	ASC El Ahmedi		
2005–2008	ASAC Concorde		
2009–2015	Tevragh-Zeina		
2015–2016	ACS Ksar		
2016–2020	Nouadhibou		
2020–2022	ASC SNIM		
2022–	ASC Gendrim		

International career^{‡}
2006–2019	Mauritania	76	(0)
- * Club domestic league appearances and goals ‡ National team caps and goals as of 2 July 2019

Souleymane Diallo (Arabic: سليمان ديالو born 2 December 1987) is a Mauritanian professional footballer who plays as a goalkeeper for Mauritanian club ASC Gendrim.
