= Football in Mauritania =

- Governing body: Football Federation of the Islamic Republic of Mauritania
- National team: national football team

Club competitions
- Mauritanian Premier League

International competitions
- Champions League; CAF Confederation Cup; Super Cup; FIFA Club World Cup; FIFA World Cup(National Team); African Cup of Nations(National Team)

The sport of football in the country of Mauritania is run by the Football Federation of the Islamic Republic of Mauritania. The association administers the national football team, as well as the Mauritanian Premier League. Football is the most popular sport in the country.

== National team ==
Mauritania is traditionally one of the weakest teams in Africa. The 2019 Africa Cup of Nations was the first time Mauritania qualified for the African Cup of Nations.

== Football stadiums in Mauritania ==
#	Stadium	Capacity	City	Tenants	Image
1	Stade Olympique	20,000	Nouakchott	Mauritania national football team	
2	Stade Municipal de Nouadhibou	10,000	Nouadhibou	FC Nouadhibou	
3	Cheikha Ould Boïdiya Stadium	8,200	Nouakchott	4 clubs	

== Attendances ==
The average attendance per top-flight football league season and the club with the highest average attendance:

Season	League average	Best club	Best club average
2018-19	315	FC Nouadhibou	680

Source: League page on Wikipedia

== See also ==
- Lists of stadiums
