= 2018–19 Ligue 1 Mauritania =

Ligue 1 Mauritania
- Season: 2018–19
- Champions: FC Nouadhibou
- Relegated: FC Deuz
- Matches: 182
- Goals: 416 (2.29 per match)
- Top goalscorer: (Mauritania) Mohamed Nouh Boilil (13 goals)

The 2018–19 Ligue 1 Mauritania is the 39th season of the Ligue 1 Mauritania, the top-tier football league in Mauritania. The season started on 28 September 2018 and ended on 4 May 2019.

== Final standings ==
Pos	Team	Pld	W	D	L	GF	GA	GD	Pts	Qualification or relegation
1	FC Nouadhibou	26	18	5	3	47	11	+36	59	Champions
2	ASAC Concorde	26	14	5	7	47	31	+16	47	
3	ASC Kédia	26	12	8	6	30	21	+9	44	
4	Nouakchott Kings	26	11	10	5	35	26	+9	43	
5	FC Tevragh-Zeina	26	10	10	6	32	27	+5	40	
6	JAHE El-Mina	26	9	13	4	24	21	+3	40	
7	AS Garde Nationale	26	8	12	6	27	22	+5	36	
8	ASC Police	26	8	9	9	29	25	+4	33	
9	ASC Tidjikja	26	8	8	10	31	32	−1	32	
10	ACS Ksar	26	7	7	12	27	36	−9	28	
11	Kaédi FC	26	6	10	10	26	35	−9	28	
12	ASC SNIM	26	5	10	11	21	30	−9	25	
13	AS Armée Nationale	26	4	6	16	20	44	−24	18	Relegated
14	FC Deuz	26	2	7	17	20	55	−35	13	Relegated

Source: soccerway.com

== Top scorers ==
Rank	Player	Team	Goals
1	(Mauritania) Mohamed Nouh Boilil	Police	13
2	(Mauritania) Sidi Abdallah Touda	Nouakchott	12
2	(Mauritania) Hemeya Tanjy	Nouadhibou	12

== Attendances ==
The average league attendance was 315:

#	Club	Average
1	FC Nouadhibou	680
2	ASC Tidjikja	462
3	ASC Kédia	417
4	Nouakchott Kings	398
5	FC Tevragh-Zeina	352
6	ASAC Concorde	310
7	ASC Police	298
8	JAHE El-Mina	298
9	AS Garde Nationale	283
10	ACS Ksar	231
11	Kaédi FC	219
12	ASC SNIM	183
13	AS Armée Nationale	152
14	FC Deuz	123
