= 2017–18 Ligue 1 Mauritania =

Ligue 1 Mauritania
- Season: 2017–18
- Champions: FC Nouadhibou
- Matches played: 182
- Goals scored: 465 (2.55 per match)

The 2017–18 Ligue 1 Mauritania season is the 38th season of the premier football league in Mauritania. It began on 30 September 2017 and ended on 10 June 2018.

== Final standings ==
Pos	Team	Pld	W	D	L	GF	GA	GD	Pts
1	FC Nouadhibou ASJN (Q)	26	18	6	2	46	13	+33	60
2	ASC Kédia	26	13	9	4	43	25	+18	48
3	ASC Tidjikja	26	14	6	6	40	23	+17	48
4	ASAC Concorde	26	14	6	6	39	26	+13	48
5	FC Tevragh-Zeïne	26	12	10	4	51	21	+30	46
6	Nouakchott King's	26	8	10	8	33	28	+5	34
7	ASC SNIM	26	10	4	12	26	26	0	34
8	AS Garde Nationale	26	8	9	9	31	26	+5	33
9	FC Deuz	26	9	4	13	29	37	−8	31
10	ASC Corpus Police	26	8	4	14	28	48	−20	28
11	Kaédi FC	26	8	4	14	23	49	−26	28
12	ACS Ksar	26	7	5	14	36	50	−14	26
13	Amicale Jeunesse Riadh	26	6	7	13	20	38	−18	25
14	FC Teïssir d'Atar (R)	26	3	4	19	20	55	−35	13

Updated to match(es) played on unknown. Source:
(Q) Qualified for the phase indicated; (R) Relegated

== See also ==
- 2018 Coupe du Président de la République
