= Namori Diaw =

Mauritanian footballer (born 1994)

Personal information
- Full name: Namori Diaw
- Date of birth: 30 December 1994 (age 31)
- Place of birth: Assaba, Mauritania
- Height: 1.85 m (6 ft 1 in)
- Position: Goalkeeper

Team information
- Current team: Tevragh-Zeina

Senior career*
Years	Team	Apps	(Gls)
2013–2016	Zem Zem		
2016–2021	Kédia		
2021–	Tevragh-Zeina		

International career^{‡}
2018–	Mauritania	25	(0)
- * Club domestic league appearances and goals ‡ National team caps and goals as of 04:16, 24 January 2024 (UTC)

Namori Diaw (born 30 December 1994) is a Mauritanian professional footballer who plays as a goalkeeper for Super D1 club Tevragh-Zeina and the Mauritania national team.

== International career ==
Diaw made his debut for Mauritania on 24 March 2018 against Guinea. He was included in Mauritania's squad for the 2018 African Nations Championship in Morocco.
