= Yamen Zelfani =

Tunisian football manager

Personal information
- Date of birth: 4 September 1979 (age 47)
- Place of birth: Tunisia

Team information
- Current team: Al-Talaba (head coach)

Managerial career
- Years: Team
- 2015–2016: FC Nouadhibou
- 2018–2019: Al-Merrikh
- 2019–2020: Dhofar
- 2020: JS Kabylie
- 2021: AS Soliman
- 2021–2022: Al-Kawkab
- 2022–2023: Al-Talaba
- 2023: Jeddah
- 2023–2024: Al-Kawkab
- 2024: USM Khenchela
- 2024: Olympique Béja
- 2024–2026: Diyala SC
- 2026: Al-Gharraf
- 2026: US Biskra
- 2026–: Al-Talaba

Yamen Zelfani (born 4 September 1979) is a Tunisian professional football manager.

On 26 October 2026, he was appointed manager of Algerian club US Biskra. On 18 November 2026, he was appointed manager of Iraqi club Al-Talaba.

== Managerial statistics ==
As of 4 June 2021

Managerial record by team and tenure
Team	Nat	From	To	Record				
Team	Nat	From	To	G	W	D	L	Win %
Nouadhibou	(Mauritania)	3 June 2015	1 June 2016	24	17	4	3	70.83
Al-Merrikh	(Sudan)	20 June 2018	21 May 2019	27	18	8	1	66.67
Dhofar	(Oman)	14 June 2019	28 January 2020	23	16	5	2	69.57
JS Kabylie	(Algeria)	27 January 2020	28 November 2020	9	4	4	1	44.44
AS Soliman	(Tunisia)	20 January 2021	4 June 2021	21	9	6	6	42.86
Al-Kawkab	(Saudi Arabia)	26 June 2021	16 February 2022	24	4	9	11	16.67
Al-Talaba	(Iraq)	20 November 2022	10 April 2023	19	9	6	4	47.37
Jeddah	(Saudi Arabia)	6 May 2023	31 May 2023	4	1	2	1	25.00
Al-Kawkab	(Saudi Arabia)	12 October 2023	14 February 2024	18	6	6	6	33.33
Total				169	84	50	35	49.70

== Honours ==
Nouadhibou

- Ligue 1 Mauritania runner-up: 2015–16

Al-Merrikh

- Sudan Cup: 2018

Dhofar

- Oman Super Cup: 2019

Individual

- Tunisian Ligue Professionnelle 1 Manager of the Month: April 2021, May 2021
