= Cape Verdean football clubs in African competitions =

Cape Verdean football clubs have participated in African football competitions since 1992, when Sporting Praia took part in the African Club of Championships Clubs. Six Cape Verdean clubs have participated in African competitions, and a seventh, SC Atlético, was disqualified as the federation did not name their entrant on time.

Only Sporting, Boavista, and Travadores, the top three clubs of Praia, competed more than once in its competitions, of which Sporting and Travadores are the only ones who competed more than once at the championships and Boavista in two of its continental competitions. The biggest success was the first round of continental championships, Sporting in 1992, Boavista in 1996 and Sporting again in 2008.

The last Cape Verdean club appeared at CAF competitions in 2009; due to financial concerns and minimal scheduling difficulties, neither club qualified for the CAF Champions League. Never any Cape Verdean club competed at the CAF Confederation Cup, founded in 2004 after the merger of the CAF Cup Winners' Cup and the CAF Cup. Even though the Cape Verdean Cup was held in 2007, 2009, 2010, and 2012, neither club qualified for the CAF Confederation Cup due to financial problems.

No Cape Verdean teams were included in the 2025–26 CAF Champions League, the most recent African club competition.

== Appearances in CAF competitions ==
	CAF Champions League					CAF Confederation Cup (includes CAF Cup Winners' Cup)					CAF Cup					Total				
Sporting Praia	5	13	3	3	7	2	1	0	0	1	0	0	0	0	0	7	14	3	3	8
CD Travadores	2	4	0	1	3	0	0	0	0	0	1	2	0	2	0	3	6	0	3	3
Boavista Praia	1	2	0	0	2	0	0	0	0	0	1	2	0	0	2	2	4	0	0	4
Académica do Sal	1	2	0	1	1	0	0	0	0	0	0	0	0	0	0	1	2	0	1	1
FC Derby	1	2	0	1	1	0	0	0	0	0	0	0	0	0	0	1	2	0	1	1
CS Mindelense	1	2	0	1	1	0	0	0	0	0	0	0	0	0	0	1	2	0	1	1

== African Cup of Champions Clubs/CAF Champions League ==
Season	Club	Round	Opponent	Home	Away	Notes
1992	Sporting Praia	Preliminary Round	(Senegal) Port Autonome (Dakar)	0–0	0–0 (3–1 p.)	
1992	Sporting Praia	First Round	(Tunisia) Club Africain	0–0	3–1	
1993	CS Mindelense	Preliminary Round	(Senegal) ASEC Ndiambour	1–1	2–1	
1994	Académica do Sal	Preliminary Round	(Mauritania) SONADER Ksar	0–0	2–0	
1995	CD Travadores	Preliminary Round	(The Gambia) Real de Banjul	0–0	1–0	
1996	Boavista FC	Preliminary Round	(Mauritania) ASC Sonalec	canc.	canc.	
1996	Boavista FC	First Round	(Algeria) JS Kabylie	1–2	2–0	
1997	CD Travadores	Preliminary Round	(Algeria) USM Alger	1–3	6–1	
2000	Sporting Praia	Preliminary Round	(Central African Republic) AS Tempête Mocaf	2–3	0–1 (a)	
2001	FC Derby	Preliminary Round	(The Gambia) Real Banjul	0–0	1–0	
2007	Sporting Praia	Preliminary Round	(Guinea) Fello Star	w/o (Note: Sporting Praia were disqualified because they did not show up for the 1st leg)		
2008	Sporting Praia	Preliminary Round	(Morocco) FAR Rabat	0–3	3–0 (5–4 p)	
2008	Sporting Praia	First Round	(Angola) Inter Luanda	2–1	0–1 (a)	
2009	Sporting Praia	Preliminary Round	(Morocco) FAR Rabat	0–6	1–0	

== African (CAF) Cup Winner's Cup/CAF Confederation Cup ==
Season	Club	Round	Opponent	Home	Away
2001	Sporting Praia	Preliminary Round	(Chad) Gazelle FC	2–5	w/o^{1}

^{1} Sporting Praia withdrew due to the Guinean Civil War that was taking place that year

== CAF Cup ==
Season	Club	Round	Opponent	Home	Away
1993	CD Travadores	First Round	(Mauritania) ASC Air Mauritanie	0–0	0–0
1994	Boavista Praia	First Round	(Sierra Leone) Diamond Stars	1–4	3–1
1995	SC Atlético	First Round	(Tunisia) ES Sahel	dq^{1}	

^{1} SC Atlético was disqualified as the federation did not name its entrant in time
