= Birama Gaye =

Mauritanian football manager

Personal information
- Date of birth: 1964 (age 61–62)
- Place of birth: Mauritania

Managerial career
- Years: Team
- 1994–1995: Mauritania
- 2000: Mauritania
- –2003: ASC Nasr de Sebkha
- 2007: Mauritania
- 2012–2018: ASC Tevragh-Zeïne
- 2018–2019: ASC Armée
- 2020–: ASC Tevragh-Zeïne

Birama Gaye (born 1964) is a Mauritanian football manager and former footballer and basketballer.

== Playing career ==
Gaye played for "many national clubs" in Mauritania, and also represented the Mauritania national basketball team during the 1980s.

== Managerial career ==
Gaye has managed Mauritanian clubs ASC Nasr de Sebkha where he resigned in April 2003, and ASC Tevragh-Zeïne.

He has managed the Mauritania national football team between 1994 and 1995, 2000, and 2007.
