= ASO Chlef in African football =

- Club: ASO Chlef
- Most appearances: Samir Zaoui 20
- Top scorer: Karim Ali Hadji 4
- First entry: 2006 CAF Confederation Cup
- Latest entry: 2012 CAF Champions League

ASO Chlef, an Algerian professional association football club, has gained entry to Confederation of African Football (CAF) competitions on several occasions. They have represented Algeria in the Champions League on two occasions and the Confederation Cup on two occasions.

== History ==
ASO Chlef whose team has regularly taken part in Confederation of African Football (CAF) competitions. Qualification for Algerian clubs is determined by a team's performance in its domestic league and cup competitions, ASO Chlef have regularly qualified for the primary African competition, the CAF Champions League, by winning the Ligue Professionnelle 1. ASO Chlef have also achieved African qualification via the Algerian Cup. The first continental participation was in 2006 in the CAF Confederation Cup after winning the Algerian Cup, and the first match was against AS Douanes and ended with a draw 0–0, As for the biggest win was in 2012 against ASFA Yennenga 4–1, and biggest loss in 2007 against Al-Merrikh 3–0.

== CAF competitions ==
ASO Chlef results in CAF competition
Season	Competition	Round	Opposition	Home	Away	Aggregate
2006	Confederation Cup	Preliminary Round	(Mauritania) ASC Entente	Walkover		
2006	Confederation Cup	First round	(Senegal) AS Douanes	0–0	0–1	0–1
2007	Confederation Cup	Preliminary Round	(Mauritania) ASAC Concorde	2–1	1–0	3–1
2007	Confederation Cup	First round	(Egypt) ENPPI	0–0	1–0	1–0
2007	Confederation Cup	Second Round	(Sudan) Al-Merrikh	1–0	0–3	1–3
2009	Champions League	Preliminary Round	(Guinea) Fello Star	1–0	2–1	3–1
2009	Champions League	First round	(Tunisia) Étoile du Sahel	0–0	1–2	1–2
2012	Champions League	Preliminary Round	(Burkina Faso) ASFA Yennenga	4–1	0–0	4–1
2012	Champions League	First round	(Democratic Republic of the Congo) AS Vita Club	0–0	3–2	3–2
2012	Champions League	Second Round	(Sudan) Al-Hilal	1–1	1–1	2–2 (4–2 p)
2012	Champions League	Group stage	(Tunisia) Étoile du Sahel	Annulled	Cancelled	3rd place (Note: The match Étoile du Sahel v Espérance ST on Matchday 4 was abandoned due to crowd disturbance. The CAF decided to disqualify Étoile du Sahel as a result and all results obtained previously by Étoile du Sahel within Group A were cancelled.)
2012	Champions League	Group stage	(Tunisia) Espérance de Tunis	1–0	2–3	3rd place
2012	Champions League	Group stage	(Nigeria) Sunshine Stars	1–2	0–2	3rd place

== Statistics ==
=== By season ===
Information correct as of 14 September 2012.
Key

- Pld = Played
- W = Games won
- D = Games drawn
- L = Games lost
- F = Goals for
- A = Goals against
- Grp = Group stage
- PR = Preliminary round
- R1 = First round
- R2 = Second round
- SR16 = Second Round of 16
- R16 = Round of 16
- QF = Quarter-final
- SF = Semi-final

Key to colours and symbols:

W	Winners
RU	Runners-up

ASO Chlef record in African football by season
Season	Competition	Pld	W	D	L	GF	GA	GD	Round
2006	CAF Confederation Cup	2	0	1	1	0	1	−1	R1
2007	CAF Confederation Cup	6	4	1	1	5	4	+1	R2
2009	CAF Champions League	4	2	1	1	4	3	+1	R1
2012	CAF Champions League	10	3	4	3	13	12	+1	Grp
Total		22	9	7	6	22	20	+2	

=== By competition ===
==== In Africa ====
As of 14 September 2012:

CAF competitions
Competition	Seasons	Played	Won	Drawn	Lost	Goals For	Goals Against	Last season played
Champions League	2	14	5	5	4	17	15	2012
CAF Confederation Cup	2	8	4	2	2	0	0	2007
Total	4	22	9	7	6	22	20	

== Statistics by country ==
Statistics correct as of game against Espérance ST on September 14, 2012

=== CAF competitions ===
Country	Club	P	W	D	L	GF	GA	GD
Burkina Faso	ASFA Yennenga	2	1	1	0	4	1	+3
Subtotal		2	1	1	0	4	1	+3
Mauritania	ASAC Concorde	2	2	0	0	3	1	+2
Subtotal		2	2	0	0	3	1	+2
Senegal	AS Douanes	2	0	1	1	0	1	−1
Subtotal		2	0	1	1	0	1	−1
Egypt	ENPPI	2	1	1	0	1	0	+1
Subtotal		2	1	1	0	1	0	+1
Sudan	Al-Merrikh	2	1	0	1	1	3	−2
Sudan	Al-Hilal	2	0	2	0	2	2	+0
Subtotal		4	1	2	1	3	5	−2
Guinea	Fello Star	2	2	0	0	3	1	+2
Subtotal		2	2	0	0	3	1	+2
(Democratic Republic of the Congo) DR Congo	AS Vita Club	0	0	0	0	0	0	+0
Subtotal		0	0	0	0	0	0	+0
Nigeria	Sunshine Stars	2	0	0	2	1	4	−3
Subtotal		2	0	0	2	1	4	−3
Tunisia	Étoile du Sahel	2	0	1	1	1	2	−1
Tunisia	Espérance de Tunis	2	1	0	1	3	3	+0
Subtotal		4	1	1	2	4	5	−1
Total		22	9	7	6	22	20	+2

== African competitions goals ==
Statistics correct as of game against Espérance ST on September 14, 2012

Position	Player	TOTAL	CCL	CCC
1	(Algeria) Karim Ali Hadji	4	4	–
2	(Algeria) Mohamed Seguer	3	3	–
3	(Cameroon) Anicet Eyenga	2	2	–
=	(Cameroon) Paul Emile Biyaga	2	2	–
=	(Algeria) Mohamed Messaoud	2	2	–
6	(Algeria) Hocine Achiou	1	1	–
=	(Algeria) Zakaria Haddouche	1	1	–
=	(Algeria) Farid Mellouli	1	1	–
=	(Algeria) Mustapha Gouaich	1	1	–
=	(Algeria) Mohamed Zaouche	1	–	1
=	(Algeria) Abbas Aïssaoui	1	–	1
=	(Algeria) Kada Kechamli	1	–	1
=	(Algeria) Yassine Boukhari	1	–	1
=	(Niger) Alhassane Issoufou	1	–	1
Totals		22	17	5

=== Hat-tricks ===
N	Date	Player	Match	Score	Time of goals
1	2 March 2012	Mohamed Seguer	ASO Chlef – ASFA Yennenga	4–1	4', 90', 90+4'

=== Two goals one match ===
N	Date	Player	Match	Score
1	8 April 2012	Karim Ali Hadji	AS Vita Club – ASO Chlef	2–3
