= Mauritanian Super Cup =

- Founded: 2003
- Region: Mauritania
- Current champions: FC Nouadhibou (2018)
- Most championships: FC Tevragh-Zeina; FC Nouadhibou (3 titles)

The Mauritanian Super Cup is a Mauritanian football competition, held as a game between the reigning champions of the Mauritanian Premier League and the Mauritanian Cup. The first edition was held in 2003.

== Winners ==
Year	Winners	Score	Runners-up	Venue	Reference
2003	ASC Nasr	2 – 1	ASC Entente	Stade Olympique, Nouakchott	
2010	FC Tevragh-Zeina	3 – 1	CF Cansado	Stade Olympique, Nouakchott	
2011	FC Nouadhibou	2 – 0	ASC Tevragh-Zeïne	Stade Olympique, Nouakchott	
2012	ASAC Concorde	2 – 1	ASC Tevragh-Zeïne	Stade Olympique, Nouakchott	
2013	FC Nouadhibou	2 – 0	ASC Nasr Zem Zem	Stade Olympique, Nouakchott	
2014	ACS Ksar	1 – 0	FC Nouadhibou	Stade Olympique, Nouakchott	
2015	FC Tevragh-Zeina	1 – 1; 5–4 (p)	ACS Ksar	Stade Municipal, Nouadhibou	
2016	FC Tevragh-Zeina	6 – 0	ASAC Concorde	Stade Olympique, Nouakchott	
2017	ASAC Concorde	2–2; 4–3 (p)	FC Nouadhibou	Stade Municipal, Kaédi	
2018	FC Nouadhibou	4 – 2	ASAC Concorde		
2019	ASC SNIM	1 – 0	ASC Kédia		
2020	FC Tevragh-Zeina		ASC SNIM	Stade Cheikha Ould Boïdiya	
2021	ASAC Concorde	0 – 0; 6–5 (p)	FC Tevragh-Zeina		

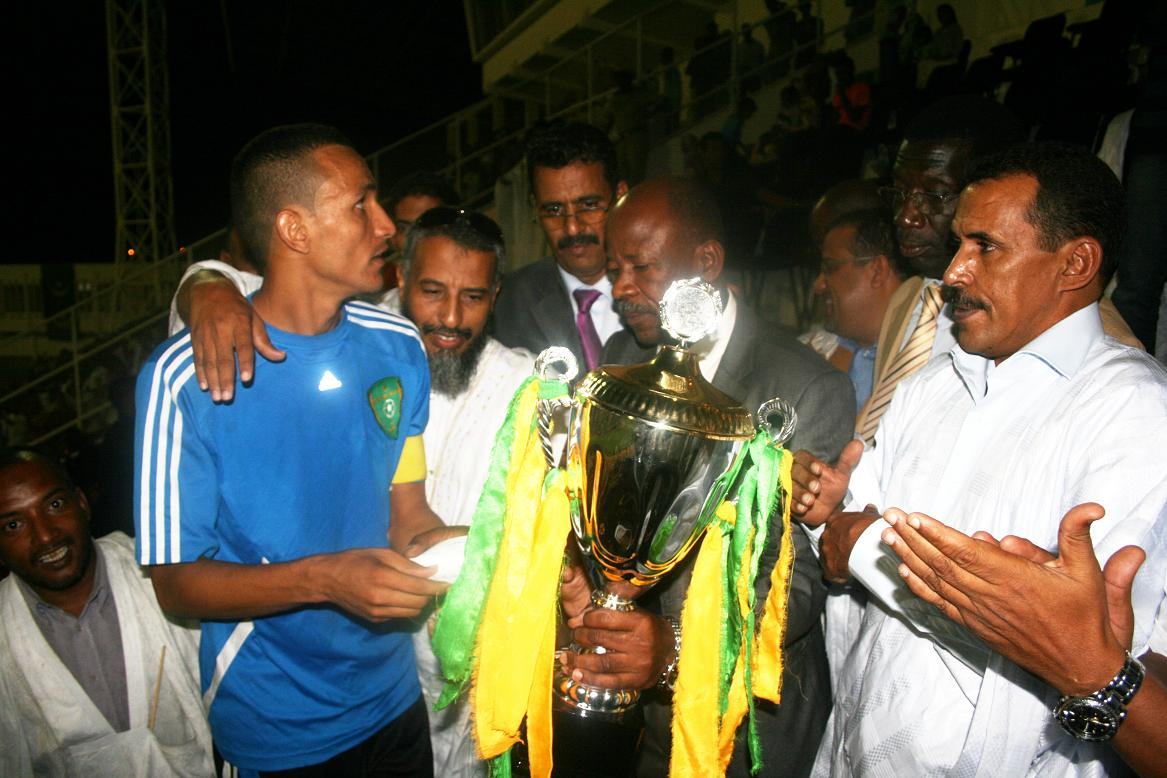
The Mauritanian Super Cup

== 2015 Super Cup controversy ==
In November 2015, Mohamed Ould Abdel Aziz, President of Mauritania, reportedly ordered the 2015 Mauritanian Super Cup to go to a penalty shootout in the 63rd minute with the score tied 1–1 because he was getting bored with the match. The Mauritania Football Federation has denied claims of the president's involvement, instead saying the decision was made due to "organisational issues", in accordance with the presidents and coaches of both teams.

== See also ==
- Mauritanian Premier League
- Mauritanian Cup
