= Souleymane Diallo =

Souleymane Diallo is a name. People with that name include:

- Souleymane Diallo (boxer), French boxer (born 1937)
- Souleymane Diallo (footballer), Mauritanian footballer (born 1987)
