= ASC Entente Sebkha FC =

ASC Entente
- Full name: ASC Entente Sebkha FC
- Ground: Stade Cheikha Ould Boïdiya; Sebkha, Mauritania
- Capacity: 1000
- League: Mauritanean Premier League

ASC Entente Sebkha FC is a Mauritanean football club based in Sebkha a suburb of Nouakchott. The club plays in the Mauritanian second division.

In 2003 the team has won Coupe du Président de la République.

== Stadium ==
Currently the team plays at the 1000 capacity Stade Cheikha Ould Boïdiya.

== Achievements ==
- Coupe du Président de la République

Winner (2): 2003, 2005
