= 2016–17 Ligue 1 Mauritania =

Ligue 1 Mauritania
- Season: 2016–17
- Champions: ASAC Concorde
- Matches played: 182
- Goals scored: 446 (2.45 per match)
- Top goalscorer: Hemeya Tanjy; Abdoulaye Gaye Papaye (16 goals each)

The 2016–17 Ligue 1 Mauritania season was the 37th season of the premier football league in Mauritania. It began on 24 September 2016 and concluded on 25 May 2017.

== Standings ==
Pos	Team	Pld	W	D	L	GF	GA	GD	Pts	Qualification or relegation
1	ASAC Concorde	26	17	5	4	54	27	+27	56	Champions
2	FC Tevragh-Zeïne	26	17	4	5	48	14	+34	55	
3	FC Deuz	26	15	6	5	34	20	+14	51	
4	ASC Tidjikja	26	12	9	5	33	15	+18	45	
5	FC Nouadhibou ASJN	26	11	8	7	46	24	+22	41	
6	ACS Ksar	26	11	5	10	35	34	+1	38	
7	AS Garde Nationale	26	9	10	7	26	29	−3	37	
8	ASC Corpus Police	26	8	10	8	21	28	−7	34	
9	ASC SNIM	26	6	9	11	34	39	−5	27	
10	ASC Kédia	26	7	6	13	25	33	−8	27	
11	Nouakchott King's	26	5	11	10	17	23	−6	26	
12	Amicale Jeunesse Riadh	26	7	4	15	33	53	−20	25	
13	FC Toujounine	26	7	2	17	24	46	−22	23	Relegated
14	AS Armée Nationale	26	3	5	18	16	61	−45	14	Relegated
