= Nouadhibou Cemetery =

Cemetery in Nouadhibou, Mauritania

Coordinates: 20.91741°N 17.04639°W

Nouadhibou Cemetery is a cemetery in Nouadhibou, Mauritania. It is located just to the west of Nouadhibou Mosque, overlooking the harbour. It is also known as St. Etienne Chapel Cemetery, corresponding to Nouadhibou's French name Port Etienne.

It has a memorial to five Commonwealth airmen formerly buried there after the Second World War.
