= Institut Superieur des Etudes et Recherches Islamique =

Higher education institution in Nouakchott, Mauritania

Coordinates: 18°4′44″N 15°58′22″W

Institut Superieur des Etudes et Recherches Islamique is a university and centre for Islamic research in Nouakchott, Mauritania. It is located adjacent (south) to the Lycée d'Arabe.
