= ASC Guemeul =

Guemeul
- Full name: ASC Guemeul
- Founded: 2011
- Ground: Stade Trarza; Rosso, Mauritania
- Capacity: 1000
- League: Mauritanean Premier League

ASC Guemeul is a Mauritanean football club based in Rosso the capital of the Trarza region. The club plays in the Mauritanean Premier League.

== Stadium ==
Currently the team plays at the 1000 capacity Stade Trarza.
