= Lycée d'Arabe =

School in Nouakchott, Mauritania

Coordinates: 18°4′47″N 15°58′20″W

Lycée d'Arabe is a school in Nouakchott, Mauritania. It is located opposite (south) to the Stade de la Capitale, (east) to the College des Garçons and (north) to the Institut Superieur des Etudes et Recherches Islamique.

== See also ==
- Education in Mauritania
- Lists of schools
