= ASC Trarza Nadi Sporting =

- Full name: Association Sportive et Culturelle de Trarza Nadi Sporting
- Ground: Stade Trarza; Rosso, Mauritania
- Capacity: 1,000
- League: Mauritanean Premier League
- 2022-23: ▼13th in Premier League

ASC Trarza Nadi Sporting is a Mauritanean football club based in Rosso, the capital of the Trarza region. The club plays in the Mauritanean Premier League.

== Stadium ==
Currently the team plays at the 1,000-capacity Stade Trarza.

== Honours ==
- Coupe du Président de la République

Winner (2): 1982, 1984
