= ASC El Ahmedi =

El Ahmedi
- Full name: El Ahmedi FC
- Ground: Stade Olympique, Nouakchott, Mauritania
- Capacity: 10,000
- League: Mauritanean Premier League

El Ahmedi is a Mauritanean football club based in Nouakchott, the capital of the Mauritania. The club plays in the Mauritanean Premier League.

The club was founded in 1993.

In 2006, the club was banned from continental competitions for two years following withdrawal from an African Champions League match.

The team plays at the Nouakchott Olympic Stadium.
