= ASC Mauritel Mobile FC =

Mauritanian football club

- Full name: ASC Mauritel Mobile FC
- Founded: 2003
- Ground: Olympic Stadium; Nouakchott, Mauritania
- Capacity: 20,000
- League: Mauritanian Premier League
Home colours

ASC Mauritel Mobile FC is a Mauritanian football club founded in 2003 based in Nouakchott.

== Achievements ==
- Mauritanian Premier League: 2

2000, 2006

- Coupe du Président de la République: 1

2007

== Performance in CAF competitions ==
- CAF Champions League: 1 appearance.

2007 – Preliminary Round

- CAF Cup Winners' Cup: 1 appearance.

1996 – Disqualified in Preliminary Round
