= ASC Sonalec =

Mauritanean football club

ASC Sonelec
- Full name: Association Sportive et Culturelle Sonelec
- Ground: Stade Olympique (Nouakchott); Nouakchott, Mauritania
- Capacity: 20,000
- League: Mauritanean Premier League
Home colours	Away colours

Association Sportive et Culturelle Sonelec (sometimes referred to as ASC Sonelec) is a Mauritanean football club based in the capital city of Nouakchott. The club plays in the Mauritanean Second Division.

In 1995 the team has won the Mauritanean Premier League, their only title. The club also has two national cup titles which were won for two consecutive seasons in 1997 and 1998.

The club is currently playing in the National Second Division in the Special Zone and was 5th of the 2014/15 season.

After winning their only championship title ASC Sonalec was to challenge Boavista Praia from Cape Verde in the southwest, the tournament was abandoned and was out of the African Cup of Champions Clubs. This was Sonalec's only appearance, one of a few clubs in what is now the CAF Champions League that has never scored a goal and have never played a match.

== Stadium ==
Currently the team plays at the 20,000 capacity Stade Olympique (Nouakchott).

== Honours ==
- Mauritanean Premier League

Champion (1): 1995

- Coupe du Président de la République

Winner (2): 1997, 1998

== Performance in CAF competitions ==
- CAF Champions League: 1 appearance

1996 African Cup of Champions Clubs – First Round

(Cape Verde) Boavista FC, tournament abandoned, Boavista succeeded to the first round, club lost to Boavista
