= 2015–16 Ligue 1 Mauritania =

Ligue 1 Mauritania
- Season: 2015–16
- Champions: FC Tevragh-Zeina
- Matches played: 156
- Goals scored: 289 (1.85 per match)

The 2016–17 Ligue 1 Mauritania season was the 36th season of the premier football league in Mauritania. It began on 19 September 2015 and concluded on 17 May 2016.

== Standings ==
Pos	Team	Pld	W	D	L	GF	GA	GD	Pts	Qualification or relegation
1	FC Tevragh-Zeïne	24	19	4	1	50	15	+35	61	Champions
2	FC Nouadhibou ASJN	24	17	4	3	54	11	+43	55	
3	ASAC Concorde	24	11	11	2	42	23	+19	44	
4	ASC Tidjikja	24	12	6	6	32	27	+5	42	
5	ACS Ksar	24	11	7	6	31	23	+8	40	
6	AS Garde Nationale	24	10	6	8	31	26	+5	36	
7	ASC SNIM	24	8	9	7	28	25	+3	33	
8	ASC Zem-Zem	24	8	7	9	27	25	+2	31	
9	ASC Corpus Police	24	8	6	10	26	28	−2	30	
10	FC Toujounine	24	4	7	13	21	39	−18	19	
11	AS Armée Nationale	24	3	6	15	16	35	−19	15	
12	ASC Kédia	24	3	5	16	18	47	−29	14	
13	Ittihad Assaba SC	24	1	4	19	13	65	−52	7	Relegated
