= ASC Imraguens =

- Full name: Association Sportive et Culturelle Imraguens
- Ground: Stade d'Atar; Atar, Mauritania, Mauritania
- Capacity: 2000
- League: Mauritanean Premier League
Home colours	Third colours

ASC Imraguens is a Mauritanean football club based in Atar, Mauritania the capital of the Adrar Region. The club plays in the Mauritanian top division.

In 1996 the team has won Coupe du Président de la République.

== Stadium ==
Currently the team plays at the 2000 capacity Stade d'Atar.

== Achievements ==
- Coupe du Président de la République

Winner (1): 1996
