= Nouadhibou Municipal Stadium =

Stadium in Mauritania

Coordinates: 20°54′59″N 17°02′47″W

- Interactive map of Nouadhibou Municipal Stadium
- Full name: Nouadhibou Municipal Stadium
- Location: Boulevard Maritime, Nouadhibou, Mauritania
- Capacity: 10,300
- Surface: Artificial turf

Construction
- Renovated: 2021

Tenants
- FC Nouadhibou; ASC Snim

The Nouadhibou Municipal Stadium (Arabic: الملعب البلدي لنواذيبو), or Municipal Stadium in English, is a multi-purpose stadium in Nouadhibou, Mauritania. It is used mostly for football matches. The capacity has been increased to 10,300 since the most recent renovation. The stadium is used by the FC Nouadhibou.

== History ==
The stadium has been completely renovated in 2020 in order to prepare for the 2021 Africa U-20 Cup of Nations hosted by Mauritania. Its capacity was increased from 1,000 to 10,300 seats.
