= Sebkha, Mauritania =

Sebkha
- Commune and city
- Location in Mauritania
- Coordinates: 18°04′32″N 16°00′07″W
- Country: Mauritania
- Region: Nouakchott-Ouest

Area
  - Total: 80.92 km^{2} (31.24 sq mi)

Population
  - Total: 72,245
  - Density: 892.8/km^{2} (2,312/sq mi)
- Time zone: UTC+0 (GMT)

Sebkha is a suburb of Nouakchott and urban commune in western Mauritania. It has a population of 72,245 (2013 census).

The football teams ASC Nasr de Sebkha and ASC Socogim are based there.
