= Mauritanian President's Cup =

Mauritanian Cup
- Founded: 1976
- Region: Mauritania
- Current champions: ASC Snim (2022)
- Most championships: ACS Ksar (5 titles); ASC Tevragh-Zeïna (5 titles); Nouadhibou (5 titles)
- 2025 Coupe du Président de la République

The Mauritanian Cup known as Republic President Cup is the top knockout tournament of the Mauritanean football. It was created in 1976.

== Winners ==
Year	Winners	Score	Runners-up	Venue
1976	Espoirs Nouakchott	–		
1977	Espoirs Nouakchott	–		
1978	Espoirs Nouakchott	–		
1979	ACS Ksar	–		
1980	not held			
1981	ASC Garde Nationale	–		
1982	ASC Trarza	–		
1983	Espoirs Nouakchott	–		
1984	ASC Trarza	–		
1985	ASC Police	–		
1986	ASC Garde Nationale	–		
1987	AS Amical Douane	–		
1988	ASC Air Mauritanie	–		
1989	ASC Garde Nationale	–		
1990	ASC Air Mauritanie	–		
1991	AS Amical Douane	–		
1992	ASC SNIM	2–1	ASC PTT	
1993	ASC Sonader Ksar	1–0	ASC SNIM	
1994	ASC Sonader Ksar	1–0	ASC Police	
1995	ASC Air Mauritanie	–		
1996	ASC Imraguens	–	ASC SNIM	
1997	ASC Sonelec	2–0	ASC Garde Nationale	
1998	ASC Sonelec	3–2	ASC Trarza	
1999	ASC Police	2–1	ASC Garde Nationale	Stade Olympique, Nouakchott
2000	ASC Air Mauritanie	4–0	ASC Gendrim	Stade Olympique, Nouakchott
2001	ASC Garde Nationale	–		
2002	not held			
2003	ASC Entente	1–0	ACS Ksar	Stade Olympique, Nouakchott
2004	Nouadhibou	1–0	ACS Ksar	Stade Olympique, Nouakchott
2005	ASC Entente	2–1 (aet)	JA ASC SOCOGIM	Stade Olympique, Nouakchott
2006	ASC Nasr de Sebkha	1–0	Trarza	Stade Olympique, Nouakchott
2007	ASC Mauritel	0–0 (pen: 4–2)	ASC Garde Nationale	Stade Olympique, Nouakchott
2008	Nouadhibou	1–0	ASC Nasr	Stade Olympique, Nouakchott
2009	ASAC Concorde	0–0 (pen: 5–4)	ASC Tevragh-Zeïna	Stade Olympique, Nouakchott
2010	ASC Tevragh-Zeïna	3–0	FC Feu Mini	Stade Olympique, Nouakchott
2011	ASC Tevragh-Zeïna	2–0	ACS Ksar	Stade Olympique, Nouakchott
2012	ASC Tevragh-Zeïna	1–0	ASAC Concorde	Stade Olympique, Nouakchott
2013	ASC Nasr Zem Zem	1–0 (aet)	ASC Kédia	Stade Olympique, Nouakchott
2014	ACS Ksar	1–0	ASAC Concorde	Stade Olympique, Nouakchott
2015	ACS Ksar	3–1	ASC Tidjikja	Stade Olympique, Nouakchott
2016	ASC Tevragh-Zeïna	2–1 (aet)	ASAC Concorde	Stade Olympique, Nouakchott
2017	Nouadhibou	Forfeit	ASC Tevragh-Zeïna	Stade Cheikha Ould Boïdiya, Nouakchott
2018	Nouadhibou	1–1 (aet; pen: 6–5)	Nouakchott King's	Stade Cheikha Ould Boïdiya, Nouakchott
2019	ASC Snim	1–0	ASC Kédia	Stade Cheikha Ould Boïdiya, Nouakchott
2020	ASC Tevragh-Zeïna	2–0	ASC Snim	Stade Cheikha Ould Boïdiya, Nouakchott
2021	ASAC Concorde	0-0 (6-5)	ASC Tevragh-Zeïna	
2022	Espoirt Nouakchott	2-2 (4-2)	Nouadhibou	
2023	Nouadhibou	2-0	AS Douanes	
2024	ASC Snim	2–1	ASC Tevragh-Zeïna	

== Performance by club ==
Class.	Club	City	Titles	Years
1	Ksar	Nouakchott	5	1979, 1993, 1994, 2014, 2015
1	Tevragh-Zeïna	Nouakchott	5	2010, 2011, 2012, 2016, 2020
1	Nouadhibou	Nouadhibou	5	2004, 2008, 2017, 2018, 2023
4	Espoirs Nouakchott	Nouakchott	4	1976, 1977, 1978, 1983
4	Garde Nationale	Nouakchott	4	1981, 1986, 1989, 2001
4	Air Mauritanie	Nouakchott	4	1988, 1990, 1995, 2000
7	Snim	Nouadhibou	3	1992, 2019, 2024
8	Amical Douane	Nouakchott	2	1987, 1991
8	Entente	Sebkha	2	2003, 2005
8	Police	Nouakchott	2	1985, 1999
8	Sonelec	Nouakchott	2	1997, 1998
8	Trarza	Rosso	2	1982, 1984
8	Concorde	Nouakchott	2	2009, 2021
14	Imraguens	Atar	1	1996
14	Mauritel	Nouakchott	1	2007
14	Nasr	Sebkha	1	2006
14	Nouakchott King's	Nouakchott	1	2013, 2022

Rq

- ACS Ksar (includes ASC Sonader Ksar)

== See also ==
- Mauritanian Premier League
- Mauritanian Super Cup
