= AS Douanes (Mauritania) =

Mauritanian football club

AS Douane
- Full name: Association Sportive Douane
- Ground: Stade Cheikha Ould Boïdiya
- Capacity: 8,200
- League: Mauritanian Premier League
- 2025–26: 3rd

AS Douane is a Mauritanian professional football club based in the capital Nouakchott that currently competes in the Mauritanian Premier League.

== History ==
The club was promoted to the Mauritanian Premier League following the 2020–21 second division season.
