= ASC Nasr de Sebkha =

- Full name: Association Sportive et Culturelle Nasr de Sebkha
- Founded: 1997
- Ground: Stade Cheikha Ould Boïdiya; Sebkha, Mauritania
- Capacity: 1,000
- League: Mauritanean Premier League
Home colours

Association Sportive et Culturelle Nasr de Sebkha (Arabic: الجمعية الرياضية و الثقافية نصر السبخة) known as ASC Nasr de Sebkha is a Mauritanian football club based in Sebkha, founded in 1997.

== Achievements ==
- Mauritanean Premier League

Champion (3): 2003, 2005, 2007

- Coupe du Président de la République

Winner (1): 2006

- Mauritanian Super Cup

Winner (1): 2003

== Performance in CAF competitions ==
- CAF Champions League: 1 appearance

2004 – First Round

- CAF Cup Winners' Cup: 1 appearance

2003 – First Round
