= ADK Moderne Kaédi =

Mauritanean football club

ADK
- Full name: ADK Moderne Kaedi
- Founded: 1965
- Ground: Stade de Kaédi; Kaédi, Mauritania
- Capacity: 5,000
- Chairman: Abdellah Ould Yahya
- Manager: Abderrazak Soudani
- League: Mauritanean Premier League
- 2025–26: 12th

ADK Moderne Kaedi is a Mauritanean football club based in Kaédi the capital of the Gorgol Region. The club plays in the Mauritanean Premier League.

== Stadium ==
Currently, the team plays at the 5,000 capacity Stade de Kaédi.
