= AS Garde Nationale =

- Full name: Association Sportive de la Garde Nationale
- Ground: Stade Olympique; Nouakchott, Mauritania
- Capacity: 20,000
- Chairman: Col. Bakary Kharchi
- Manager: Noureddine Daddah
- League: Ligue 1 Mauritania
- 2023–2024: 10th

Association Sportive de la Garde Nationale (Arabic: الجمعية الرياضية للحرس الوطني) known as AS Garde Nationale is a Mauritanian football club based in Nouakchott.

== History ==
The club was founded in Nouakchott. It was known on past under the name of ASC Garde Nationale (Association Sportive et Culturelle de la Garde Nationale).

== Crest ==
Former logo

Present logo

== Achievements ==
- Mauritanean Premier League
  - Champions (7): 1976, 1977, 1978, 1979, 1984, 1994, 1998
- Coupe du Président de la République
  - Winners (4): 1981, 1986, 1989, 2001

== Performance in CAF competitions ==
- African Cup of Champions Clubs: 5 appearances

1977 – first round
1978 – second round
1979 – first round

1980 – first round
1985 – first round

- CAF Cup Winners' Cup: 1 appearance

1982 – preliminary round
