= Chemal FC =

Mauritanian football club

- Full name: Chemal Football Club
- Nickname: Cheirabuedamal Fc
- Ground: Stade Olympique (Nouakchott); Nouakchott, Mauritania
- Capacity: 20,000
- Chairman: Tewfick Haidalla
- Manager: Luís Ortigas Fonseca
- League: Mauritanian Premier League
- 2025–26: 6th
Home colours

Chemal FC, before August 2022 known as ASC Tidjikja is a Mauritanian football club based in Nouakchott, the capital of Mauritania. The club plays in the Mauritanian Premier League.

== Stadium ==
Currently the team plays at the 20,000 capacity Stade Olympique (Nouakchott).

== Titles ==
- Coupe du Président de la République
  - Runners-up (1): 2015
- Coupe de la Ligue Nationale
  - Winners (1): 2018
  - Runners-up (1): 2017
