= ASC Police =

- Full name: Association Sportive et Culturelle de la Police
- Ground: Stade Olympique (Nouakchott); Nouakchott, Mauritania
- Capacity: 20,000
- League: Mauritanean Premier League
- 2025–26: 12th

Association Sportive et Culturelle de la Police (Arabic: الجمعية الرياضية و الثقافية للشرطة) is a Mauritanean football club based in Nouakchott. The club plays in the Mauritanean Premier League, which it won in 1981. ASC Police often play league games in front of hundreds of spectators.

== Stadium ==
Currently the team plays at the 10,000 capacity Stade Olympique (Nouakchott).

== Honours ==
- Mauritanean Premier League

Champion (7): 1981, 1982, 1986, 1987, 1988, 1990, 1991

- Coupe du Président de la République

Winner (2): 1985, 1999

== Performance in CAF competitions ==
- CAF Champions League: 1 appearance

1983 – first round
