= Nouadhibou =

Nouadhibou نواذيبو (Arabic)
- Commune and town
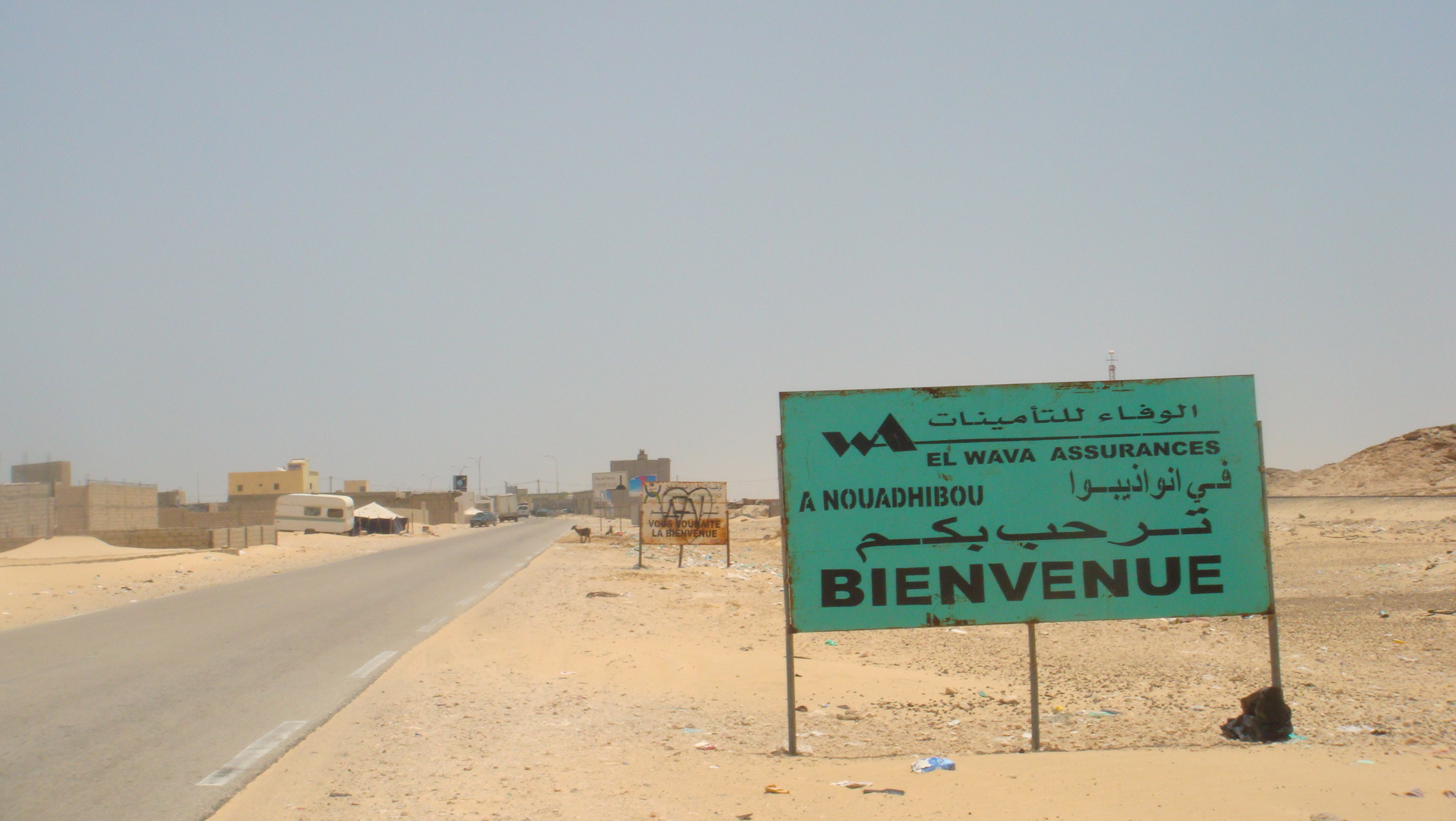
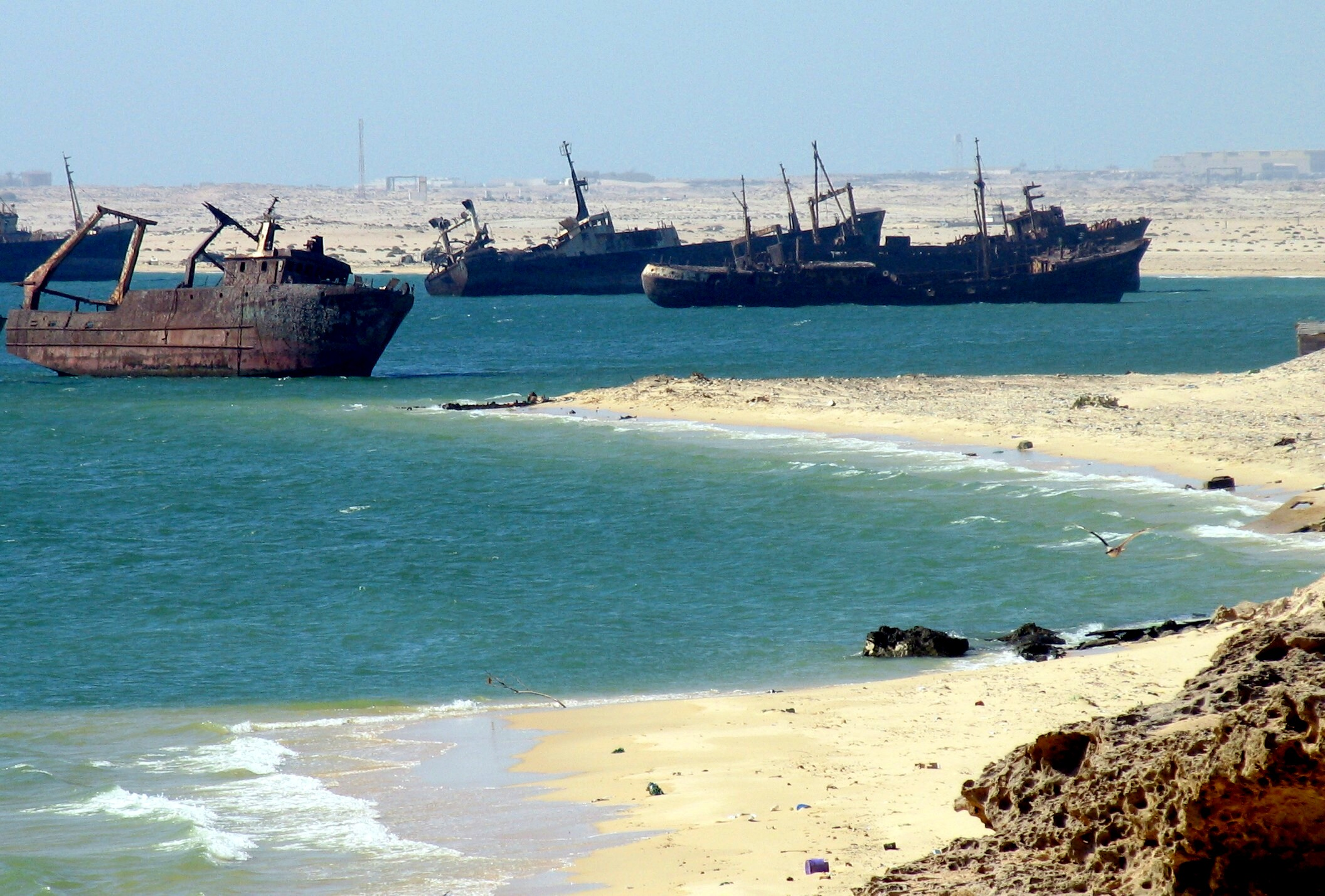
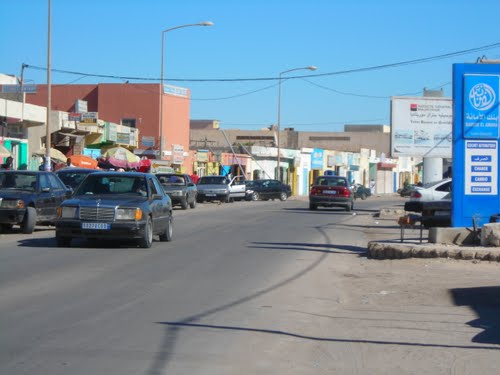
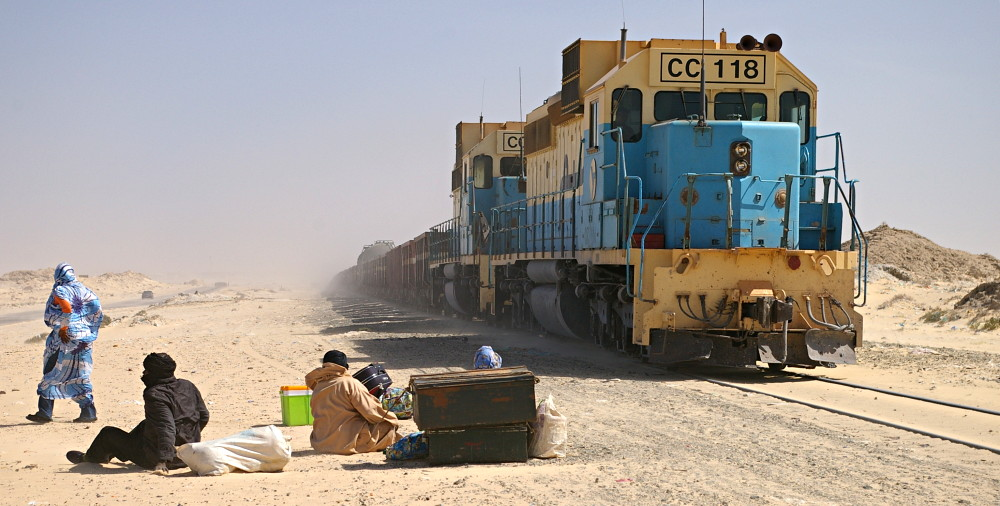
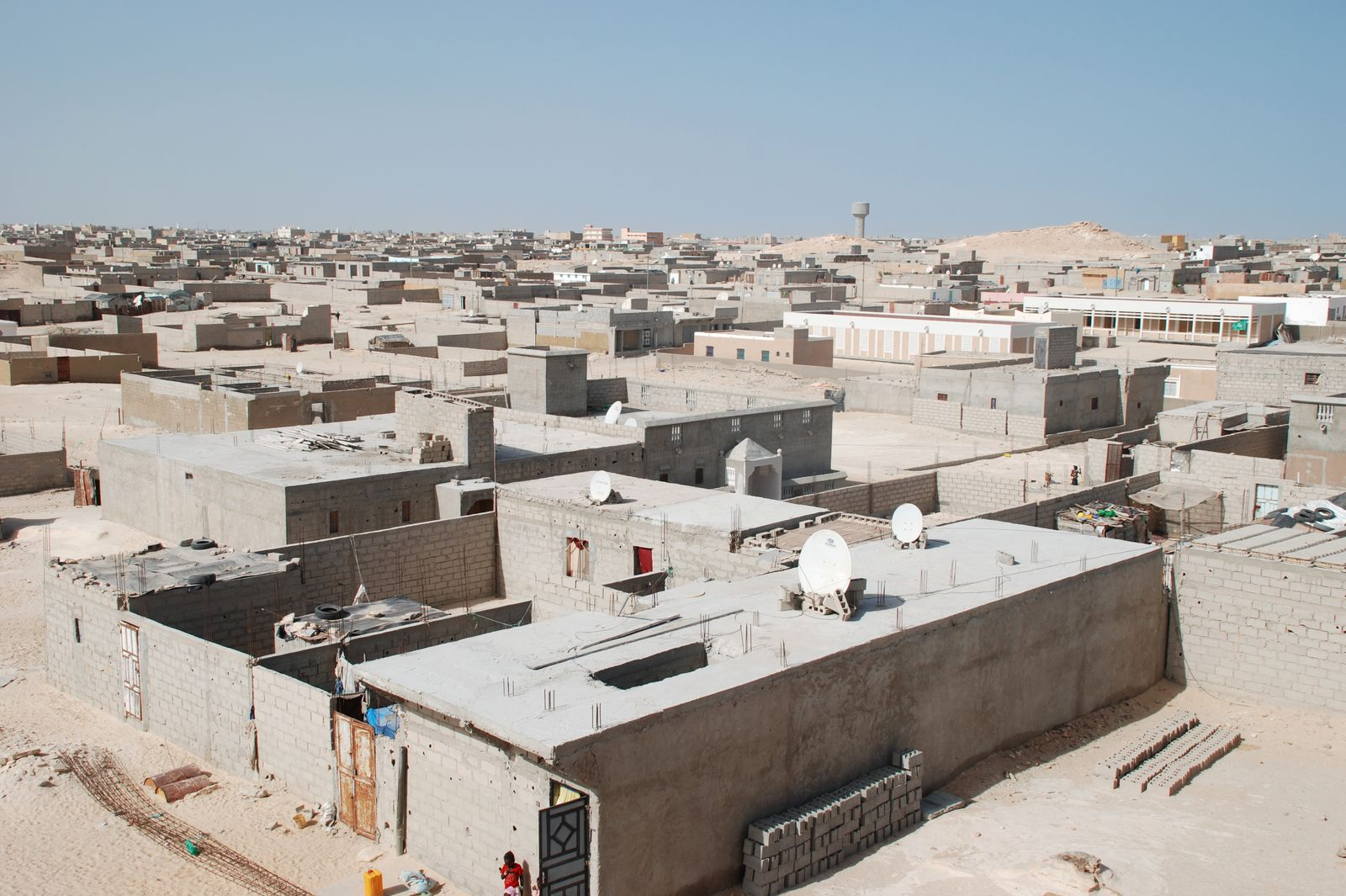
- From the top to bottom-right, Welcome to Nouadhibou, Ship Graveyard, Central Nouadhibou, Iron-Ore transporter Train arriving in Nouadhibou, Residential area

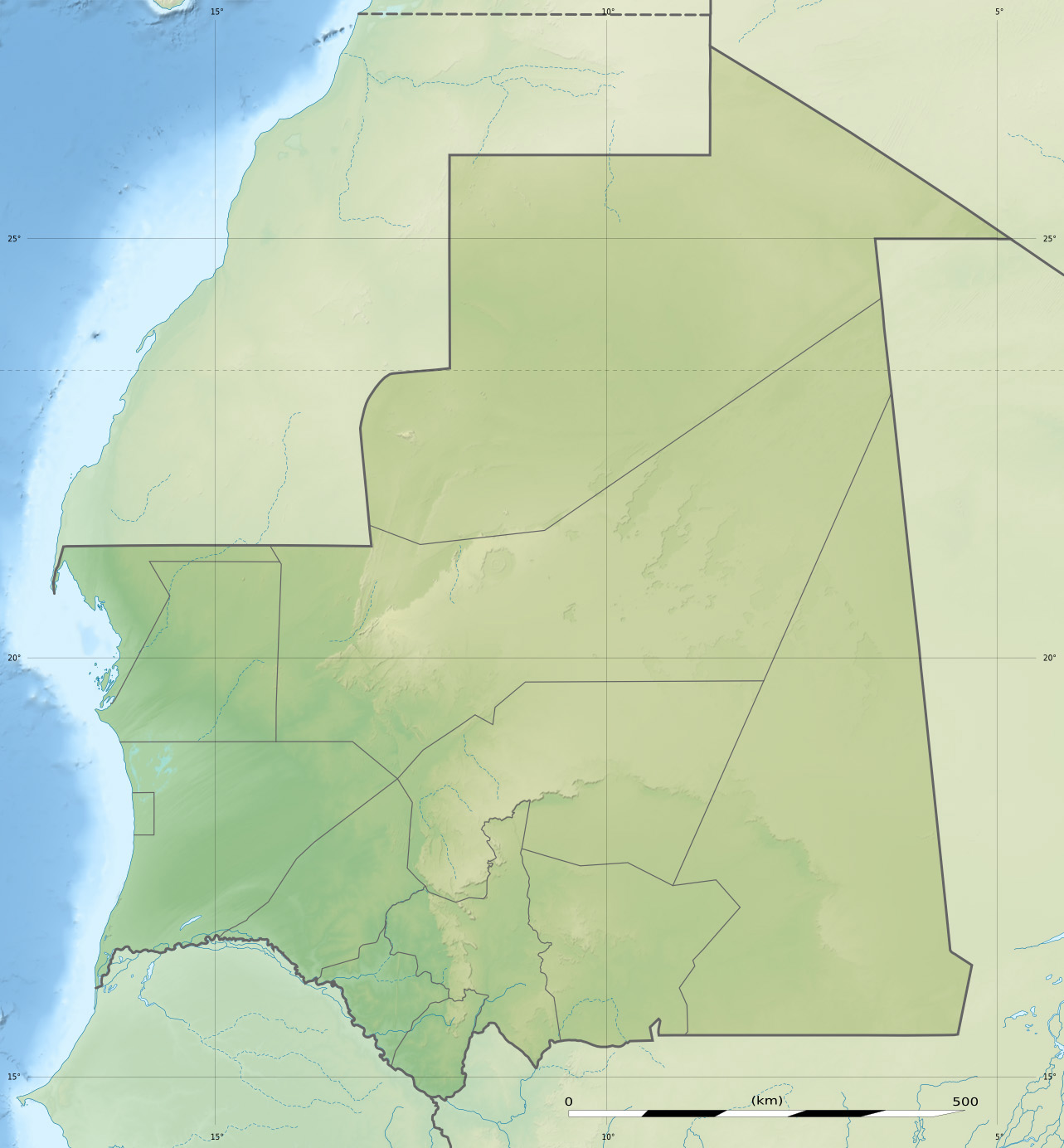
- Location in Mauritania
- Coordinates: 20°56′N 17°2′W
- Country: Mauritania
- Region: Dakhlet Nouadhibou Region
- Founded: 1906

Government
  - Mayor: Elghassem Ould Bellali

Area
  - Total: 67.50 km^{2} (26.06 sq mi)
- Elevation: 0 m (0 ft)

Population (2023 census)
  - Total: 173,525
  - Density: 2,571/km^{2} (6,658/sq mi)
- Time zone: UTC+00:00 (GMT)

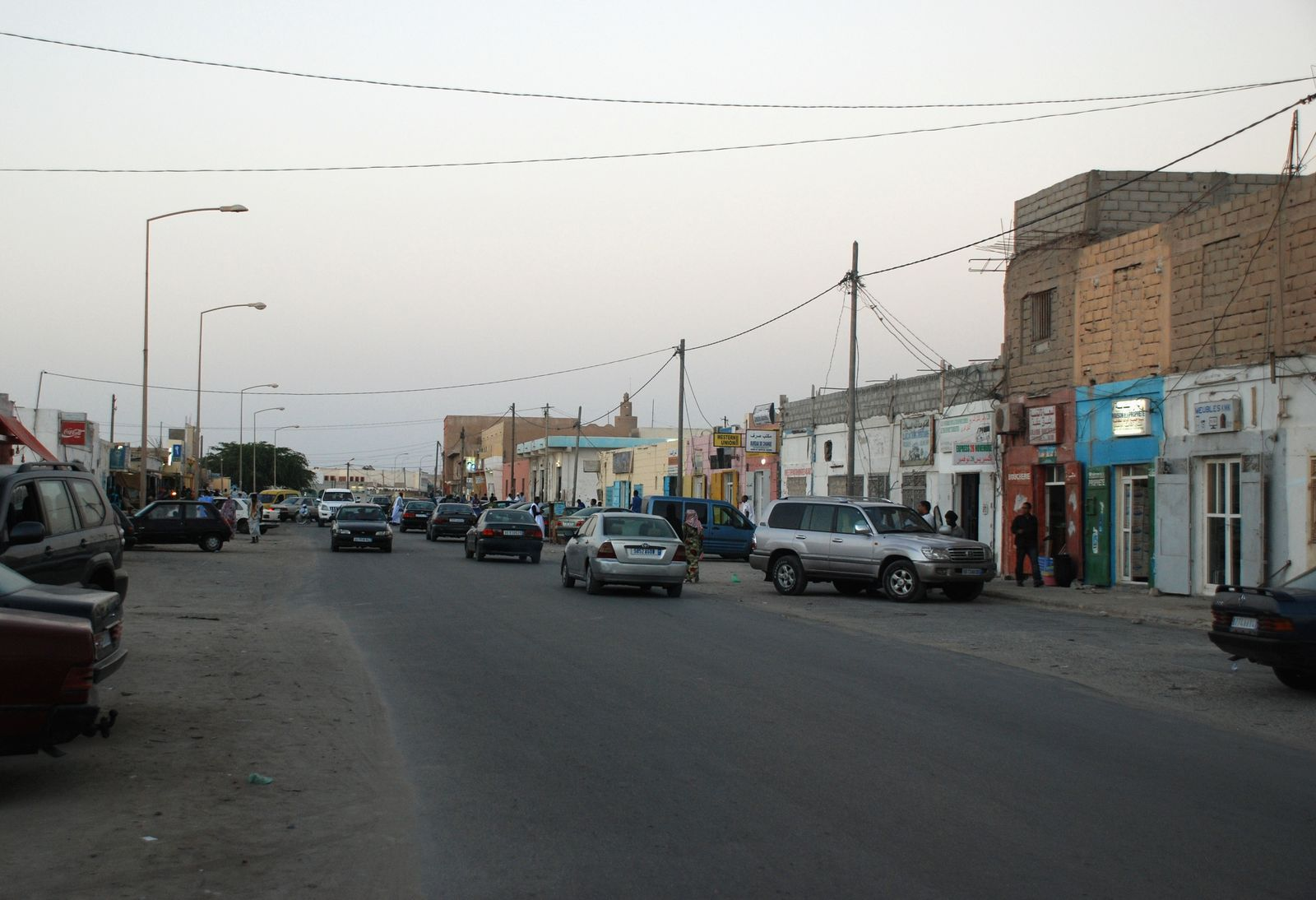
Street in Nouadhibou

Nouadhibou (/ˈnwædiːbuː, ˈnwɑː-/; Arabic: نواذيبو, romanized: Nwādhībū, Hassaniyya: [nwaðiːbu]), formerly named Port-Étienne, is the second largest city in Mauritania and serves as a major commercial center. The city has about 173,000 inhabitants. It is situated on a 65-kilometre peninsula or headland called Ras Nouadhibou, Cap Blanc, or Cabo Blanco, of which the western side has the city of La Güera. Nouadhibou is consequently located merely a couple of kilometers from the border between Mauritania and Western Sahara. Its current mayor is Elghassem Ould Bellali, who was installed on 15 October 2018.

Nouadhibou is a major hotspot for migrant smuggling, serving as a key departure point for those attempting to reach Europe.

== Overview ==
The city consists of four major areas: the city center, including the international airport; Numerowatt to the north; Cansado, the main residential area, to the south; and a dormitory town for the workers of the harbor facilities which are located a few kilometers south of the city, near the tip of the Ras Nouadhibou peninsula, at Port Minéralier.

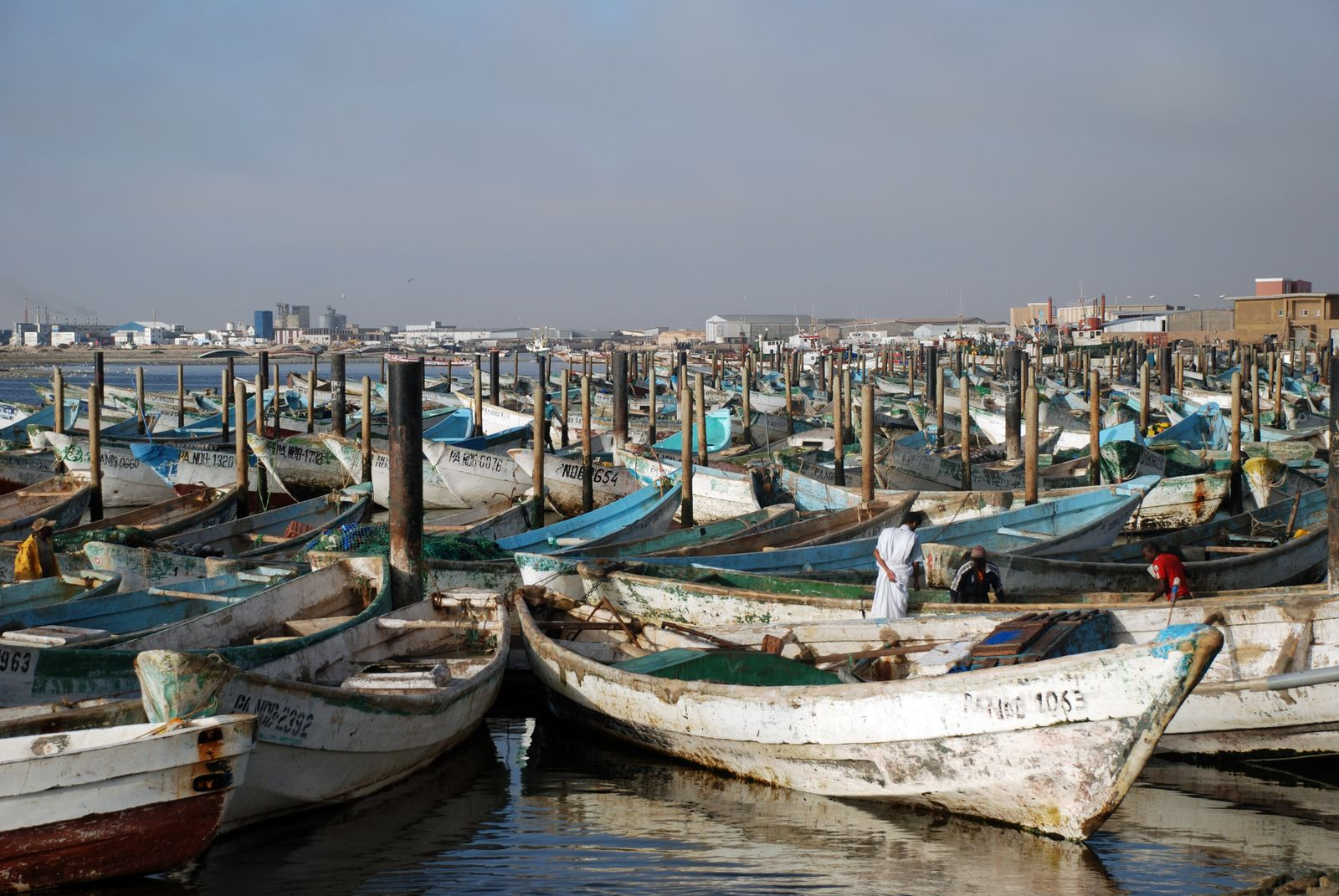
Boats in Nouadhibou's harbour

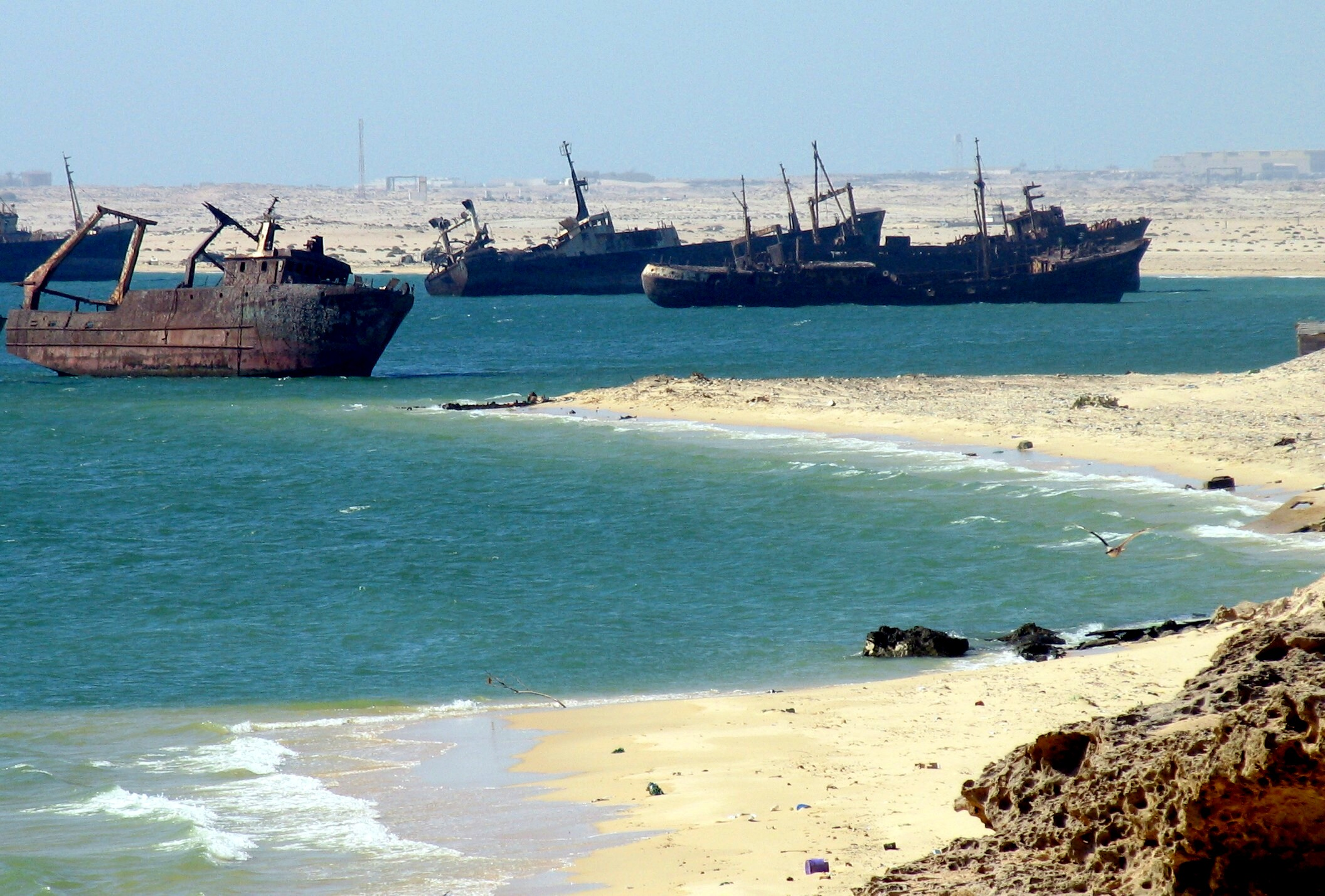
Ships graveyard, Nouadhibou

Attractions in Nouadhibou include the Table Remarquable, several markets, a ships' graveyard and Mediterranean monk seals.

The port of Nouadhibou is the final resting place of over 300 scuttled ships, forming the world's largest ship graveyard. Unlike the mass arrival of ships at Mallows Bay, here the number of craft has built up over time, as corrupt officials accepted bribes from boat owners to allow them to dump their vessels in the area.

Nouadhibou has long been an important transit point for international transport. In the beginning of the 20th century, it was a stopover for the Latécoère air-transport network for mail and passengers for western Africa and overseas colonies like Martinique. Antoine de Saint-Exupery spent much time there as a pilot and as writer.

Near the harbor is the terminus of Mauritania's only railway line, which mainly brings iron ore from the mining areas near Fdérik and Zouérat, which are located up to 704 kilometres (437 mi) inland.

Processing iron ore forms the largest industry in Nouadhibou, although the overall major economic activity is fishing.

== History ==
The town was established as a small fishing port, controlled by the Portuguese, the Dutch and finally the French.

In 1907 by decree of the governor-general of French West Africa Ernest Roume, it was renamed Port-Étienne after the former French Minister of the Colonies Eugène Étienne. After Mauritania became independent in 1960, the town was renamed Nouadhibou.

On 30 June 1973, at the time of the second-longest solar eclipse in the 20th century, an Aerobee rocket was launched at Nouadhibou for solar research.

Since February 2006, Nouadhibou has emerged as a major departure point for African migrants aiming to reach the Canary Islands. This extremely dangerous route to reach the European Union gained popularity due to heightened emigration controls along Morocco's coast and near the Spanish enclaves of Ceuta and Melilla in late 2005. As of 2024, the city remains a significant departure hub for irregular migrants to Europe, with over 80% of arrivals in the Canary Islands originating from Mauritania, many of whom are from Mali.

The city is reputedly also a center of trading of meteorites found in the Sahara.

=== Population history ===
Population of the commune of Nouadhibou (2000—2023)
Year	Population
2000	72,337
2013	118,167
2023	173,525

== Climate ==
Nouadhibou features a hot desert climate (BWh) under the Köppen climate classification. The city sees virtually no rainfall during the course of the year averaging a paltry 18 millimetres (0.71 in) annually. Despite the fact that it features a hot desert climate, the area does not quite see the extreme temperatures that other areas with this climate feature because of strong maritime influences, which also causes a seasonal lag in the warmer months. The average annual temperature in the city is 21.3 °C (70.3 °F) and the average annual high temperature is 27.1 °C (80.8 °F).

Climate data for Nouadhibou (extremes 1906-present)
Month	Jan	Feb	Mar	Apr	May	Jun	Jul	Aug	Sep	Oct	Nov	Dec	Year
Record high °C (°F)	33.6 (92.5)	36.0 (96.8)	38.0 (100.4)	38.5 (101.3)	39.4 (102.9)	41.0 (105.8)	39.7 (103.5)	39.4 (102.9)	41.3 (106.3)	40.5 (104.9)	37.4 (99.3)	34.9 (94.8)	41.3 (106.3)
Mean daily maximum °C (°F)	24.3 (75.7)	25.4 (77.7)	27.0 (80.6)	26.2 (79.2)	26.5 (79.7)	27.9 (82.2)	27.2 (81.0)	28.2 (82.8)	30.5 (86.9)	29.9 (85.8)	27.3 (81.1)	24.7 (76.5)	27.1 (80.8)
Daily mean °C (°F)	18.3 (64.9)	19.2 (66.6)	20.1 (68.2)	19.9 (67.8)	20.4 (68.7)	22.8 (73.0)	22.4 (72.3)	23.5 (74.3)	24.6 (76.3)	23.3 (73.9)	21.2 (70.2)	19.2 (66.6)	21.3 (70.3)
Mean daily minimum °C (°F)	13.6 (56.5)	14.2 (57.6)	14.8 (58.6)	15.1 (59.2)	16.1 (61.0)	17.4 (63.3)	18.8 (65.8)	19.9 (67.8)	20.3 (68.5)	19.0 (66.2)	16.8 (62.2)	14.5 (58.1)	16.7 (62.1)
Record low °C (°F)	4.0 (39.2)	9.5 (49.1)	10.0 (50.0)	8.9 (48.0)	9.8 (49.6)	10.5 (50.9)	10.8 (51.4)	12.8 (55.0)	13.4 (56.1)	10.0 (50.0)	10.0 (50.0)	9.0 (48.2)	4.0 (39.2)
Average rainfall mm (inches)	2 (0.1)	3 (0.1)	2 (0.1)	1 (0.0)	1 (0.0)	1 (0.0)	1 (0.0)	3 (0.1)	5 (0.2)	3 (0.1)	2 (0.1)	1 (0.0)	23 (0.9)
Average rainy days (≥ 1.0 mm)	0.3	0.4	0.3	0.3	0.1	0.1	0.2	0.4	0.7	0.2	0.2	0.1	3.1
Average relative humidity (%)	63	68	69	72	73	74	79	78	73	72	69	66	71
Mean monthly sunshine hours	248.0	237.3	279.0	285.0	310.0	276.0	260.4	272.8	246.0	254.2	243.0	244.9	3,156.6
Mean daily sunshine hours	8.0	8.4	9.0	9.5	10.0	9.2	8.4	8.8	8.2	8.2	8.1	7.9	8.6
Source 1: Deutscher Wetterdienst
Source 2: Meteo Climat (record highs and lows)

== Transportation ==
=== Paved roads ===
Nouadhibou is linked with the Coastal Motorway RN2 to the capital Nouakchott (a distance of 450 km (280 mi)) and by highway to the Western Saharan border in the north (a distance of 70 km (43 mi)).

=== Railway ===
Nouadhibou also is connected by railway to the iron mines in Zouérat, 670 km to the east. The freight trains can be as long as 3 km, reputedly the longest train in the world. The railway also carries passengers and calls at Choum.

=== Aviation ===
The city is served by the Nouadhibou Airport.

== Economy ==
Plans were drawn up at the beginning of 1963 to build a port called Port Wharf in the fishing harbour, which included the construction of industrial and trade buildings. This became operational in 1966. This wharf was designed to accommodate traffic of up to 50,000 tonnes.

In 1977, the wharf was lengthened to provide 3 extra berths for ships of average tonnage raising its capacity to 320,000 tonnes.

== Health ==
The Nouadhibou Regional Hospital was opened in 2017 after a build time of five years and is the largest hospital in the region.

== Sports ==
Two football clubs based in Nouadhibou participate in the Mauritanian Premier League as of the 2018–19 season: FC Nouadhibou and ASC Snim.
