= ASC Kédia =

- Full name: ASC Kédia
- Ground: Stade Municipal Zouérate; Zouérate, Mauritania
- Capacity: 1,000
- League: Mauritanean Premier League
- 2022–23: 5th

ASC Kédia is a Mauritanean football club based in Zouérat the capital of the Tiris Zemmour region. The club plays in the Mauritanean Premier League.

== Stadium ==
Currently the team plays at the 1000 capacity Stade Municipal Zouérate.
