= Cheikha Ould Boïdiya Stadium =

Stadium in Nouakchott, Mauritania

Coordinates: 18°4′56″N 15°58′17″W

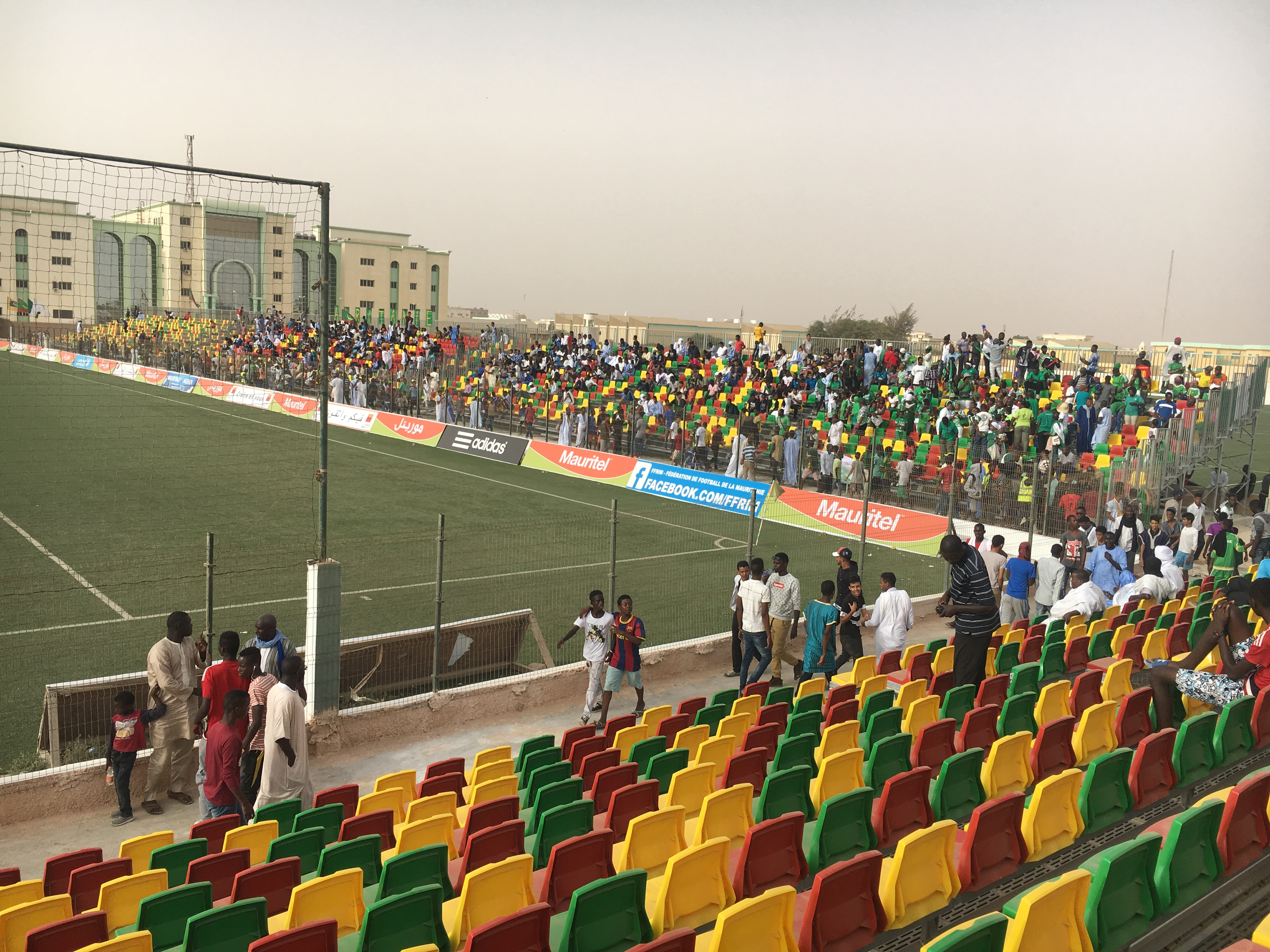
- Interactive map of Cheikha Ould Boïdiya Stadium
- Full name: Cheikha Ould Boïdiya Stadium
- Former names: Stade de la Capitale
- Location: Nouakchott, Mauritania
- Capacity: 8,200
- Surface: Grass

Construction
- Built: 1968
- Opened: 1969
- Renovated: 9 January 2019

Tenants
- ASC Nasr de Sebkha; Mauritania national football team Al Hilal (2024–25); Al Merrikh (2024–25)

Cheikha Ould Boïdiya Stadium (Arabic: ملعب شيخا ولد بيديا) is a football stadium located in Nouakchott, Mauritania which has a capacity of 8,200 spectators. It is located adjacent (south) to the École d'Application, opposite to the Maison de Jeunes to the west and Lycée d'Arabe to the south. A racing club with a swimming pool and four tennis courts is also located in the complex. It's the second oldest stadium after the Stade du Ksar.

== History ==
The stadium was built in 1968. It was inaugurated in 1969 under the name of Stade de la Capitale. In 1970 it hosted the first national sporting event in Mauritania, a National Sports Week, inaugurated by President Mokhtar Ould Daddah.

In 1983, with the inauguration of the Stade Olympique, all sports competitions were transferred to the new stadium, in front of it that would deteriorate over time, abandoned to its fate.

In 1990, a major rehabilitation operation was carried out.

In April 2012, the stadium lighting works began, and it was renamed Cheikha Ould Boïdiya, a former president of the Mauritanian Football Federation who died in 1988 in a traffic accident.

In 2019, the stadium was renovated and expanded to have a capacity from 500 to 8,200 people.

The stadium hosted the 2021 Africa U-20 Cup of Nations.
