= FC Nouadhibou =

Mauritanian association football club

- Full name: Football Club Nouadhibou
- Nicknames: Al Zaaem (The Boss)
- Founded: 1999; 27 years ago
- Ground: Stade Municipal de Nouadhibou, Nouadhibou
- Capacity: 10,300
- Chairman: Moulaye Boughourbal Abdel Aziz (in 2014)
- Manager: Kazimierz Jagiełło
- League: Mauritanian Premier League
- 2025–26: 1st of 16 (champions)
- Website: www.fcndb.com
Home colours	Away colours	Third colours

FC Nouadhibou is a Mauritanian professional football club based in the commercial centre of Nouadhibou. They compete in the Ligue 1 Mauritania, the top flight of Mauritanian football.

== History ==
The club was founded in 1999 by a group of young people led by Ahmed Yahya Ould Abderrahmane who became the club's first president. He is the current president of the FMF (Fédération mauritanienne de Football).

Before the creation of the club, there was another club that existed in the late 20th century under the name Imraguens de Nouadhibou. It is unrelated to ASC Imraguens which is based in Atar in another region, an existing club. The club participated for a few times at the WAFU Club Championship especially in 1987.

Nouadhibou's appearances at the national cup competitions was in 2004 and defeated 1–0 over ASC Ksar to win their first cup title, their recent appearance was in 2008 and defeated 1–0 over Nasr de Sebkha and won their recent cup title for the club.

Their first appearance at a continental competition was in 2003 and was in the preliminary round, the club faced Niger's AS Niamey and the score was 2–2 in two of its matches and lost under the away goals rule in Niamey. Their second and recent appearance was in 2014 and faced Guinea's Horoya AC, the first match was tied apiece with one goal each, Nouadhibou lost the second match 0–3 and was out of the competition. Nouadhibou did not participate in the 2002 and 2012 championships.

Nouadhibou equalled the Mauritanian record for titles with seven after winning the 2018–19 championship. They won the league title that season with two remaining games after defeating their local rival ASAC Concorde.

The club qualified for the group stage of the 2019-20 CAF Confederation Cup after defeating Triangle FC of Zimbabwe 4–3 on aggregate in the play-off round.

On 9 December 2023, FC Nouadhibou faced the Congolese club TP Mazembe, the first African football club in a world championship final. The game, which took place at the Stade Municipal de Nouadhibou, attracted a crowd of thousands of spectators and it ended in a goalless draw. The domestic league matches of FC Nouadhibou during that season were typically played in front of much smaller crowds.

== Titles ==
- Ligue 1 (Mauritania)

Champion: (14): 2001, 2002, 2011, 2013, 2014, 2017–18, 2018–19, 2019–20, 2020–21, 2021–22, 2022–23, 2023–24, 2024–25, 2025–26

- Coupe du Président de la République

Winner (5): 2004, 2008, 2017, 2018, 2023

- Coupe de la Ligue Nationale

Winner (2): 2014, 2019

- Mauritanian Super Cup

Winner (3): 2011, 2013, 2018

== League and cup history ==
=== Performance in CAF competitions ===
Nouadhibou's results in CAF competition
Season	Competition	Qualification method	Round	Opposition	Home	Away	Aggregate
2003	CAF Champions League	Mauritanean champions	Preliminary Round	(Niger) AS Niamey	2–1	1–0	2–2 (a)
2014	CAF Champions League	Mauritanean champions	Preliminary Round	(Guinea) Horoya AC	1–1	3–0	1–4

=== National level ===
Season	Tier	Pos.	Pl.	W	D	L	GS	GA	GD	P	Cup	Notes
2010–11	1	1	16	12	2	2	25	6	+19	38		
2016–17	1	5										
2017–18	1	1	26	18	6	2	46	13	+33	60		
2018–19	1	1	26	18	5	3	47	11	+36	59		

== Statistics ==
- Best position: Preliminary or Qualification Round (continental)
- Appearances at a Super Cup competition: 3 (national)
- Total goals scored at the CAF Champions League: 3
- Total goals scored at the Super Cup: 4 (national)

== Management ==
Office	Name
President	Moulaye Boughourbal Abdel Aziz
Vice president of social area	Salah Din Ould Bechir
Vice president of sports area	Zakaria Abobekrin
Corporate director general	Soueilima Ould Sidatty
Board secretary	Soueilima Ould Sidatty
Treasurer	Moulaye Ould Ahmed
Treasurer Assistant	Baba Khalidou Haydara

Last updated: 21 April 2013
Source: FC Nouadhibou

== Presidents ==
- Ahmed Yahya – first president
- Moulaye Abdel Aziz Boughourbal (as of 2014)
