= Nouakchott Kings =

- Founded: 1997
- Ground: Stade Olympique; Nouakchott, Mauritania
- Capacity: 20,000
- Owner: Yacoub Abdallahi Sidya
- Chairman: Yacoub Abdallahi Sidya
- Manager: Pape Seck
- League: Ligue 1 Mauritania
- 2025–2026: 8th

Nouakchott Kings (Arabic: نواكشوط كينغ) is a Mauritanian football club based in Nouakchott and one of the main competitors for the Ligue 1 Mauritania title every year.

== History ==
The club was found in 1997 under the name Association Sportive Culturelle Nasr Teyarett (Arabic: الجمعية الرياضية و الثقافية نصر تيارت), and was later renamed ASC Nasr Zem Zem in 2013.

After it purchase by Abdellahi Ould Sidiyah in 2016, the club was renamed Nouakchott Kings.

== Honors ==
- Coupe du Président de la République

Winners (2): 2013, 2022
Runners-up (1): 2018

== Performance in CAF competitions ==
- CAF Confederation Cup: 1 appearance

2018–19 – Preliminary round
