= ASC Snim =

ASC SNIM
- Full name: Association Sportive et Culturelle de la Société Nationale Industrielle et Minière
- Nicknames: Mineurs, Miners
- Founded: 1976
- Ground: Stade Municipal, Nouadhibou
- Capacity: 10,300
- Chairman: Sidi Ould Cheikh Abdallahi
- Manager: Sidi Ould Sidha
- League: Mauritanean Premier League
- 2025–2026: 9th
Home colours	Away colours

Association Sportive et Culturelle de la Snim (Arabic: الجمعية الرياضية و الثقافية لاسنيم) known as ASC SNIM is a professional Mauritanean football club playing in the city of Nouadhibou the capital of Dakhlet Nouadhibou Region. Its main sponsor and owner of club is SNIM (Société Nationale Industrielle et Minière), Iron ore company.

== History ==
The club was founded in 1976 and is Nouadhibou's oldest club.

The team was named CF Cansado (Club de Football de Cansado) when it was owned by Cansado from 2009 to 2012.

The club as Cansado went to the 2010 Mauritanian Super Cup and lost the match 3–1 and the title to Tevragh-Zeina.

== Logo ==
Its logo colours are blue and orange and has a shield-crest with the full name of the club on top, the SNIM logo in the middle with club names around it and has four blue circular stripes and a blue tab with the club's location written in the middle and coloured in gold.

== Uniforms ==
Home uniform up to 2009

Its uniform colours are a blue shirt, blue socks and light orange shorts during home games, and white t-shirt with thin blue wavy stripes on top and on socks, and light blue shorts during away or alternate games.

Its uniform up to 2009 was a blue-light orange t-shirt with blue sleeves and blue socks and a light orange shorts for home games.

== Achievements ==
- Mauritanean Premier League
  - Champion (2): 2009, 2010
  - Runner-up (2): 2007, 2015
- Coupe du Président de la République
  - Winner (3): 1992, 2019, 2024
- Coupe de la Ligue Nationale
  - Finalist (1): 2012
- Mauritanian Super Cup
  - Finalist (1): 2010

== League and cup history ==
=== Performance in CAF competitions ===
Ksar's results in CAF competition
Season	Competition	Qualification method	Round	Opposition	Home	Away	Aggregate
1993	African Cup Winners' Cup	Mauritanian cup winners	First Round	(Guinea-Bissau) Benfica Bissau	canc,	canc.	(Note: Benfica Bissau withdrew)
1993	African Cup Winners' Cup	Mauritanian cup winners	Second Round	(Algeria) Lost to JS Kabylie	1–8	1–3	3–9
2003	CAF Champions League	Mauritanean champions	Preliminary Round	(Ivory Coast) ASEC Abidjan, 0–7, 0–2	0–7	0–2	2–7

=== Positions ===
- 2011/12: 4th
- 2013/14: 2nd (Group A), 6th (Final Stage)

== Statistics ==
- Best position: Preliminaries (continental)
- Best position at cup competitions: Second Round (continental)
- Appearances at a Super Cup competition: Once (national)
- Total goals scored at the Super Cup: 1 (national)
- Total matches played at the CAF Champions League: 2
- Total matches played at cup competitions: 2
- Total number of wins at the continental level: 2
- Total number of goals scored at the continental level: 5
  - CAF Champions League: 2
- Cup competitions: 3

== Coaches ==
- (Mauritania) Mbodj Amadou (until 2012/13)
- (Mauritania) Sidi Ould Sidha (as of 2014)
