= Super D1 =

Association football league in Mauritania

- Founded: 1976
- Country: Mauritania
- Confederation: CAF
- Number of clubs: 14
- Level on pyramid: 1
- Relegation to: Super D2
- Domestic cup(s): Coupe du Président de la République; Mauritanian Super Cup
- International cup(s): Champions League; Confederation Cup
- Current champions: FC Nouadhibou (2025–26)
- Most championships: FC Nouadhibou (14)
- Top scorer: Hemeya Tanjy (107 goals)
- Broadcaster: TV Mauritanie
- Website: www.ffrim.org
- Current: 2026–27 Super D1

Super D1 (Arabic: الدوري الموريتاني الممتاز) is the top division of association football league system in Mauritania. It was created in 1976.

== Current clubs (2025–26) ==
Team	Location	Stadium	Capacity
Al Hilal	Omdurman (Sudan)	Cheikha Ould Boïdiya Stadium (Note: Al Hilal play their home matches at Cheikha Ould Boïdiya Stadium in Nouakchott (Mauritania), instead of their regular stadium, Al-Hilal Stadium, Omdurman, due to the Sudanese civil war.)	8,200
Al Merrikh	Omdurman (Sudan)	Cheikha Ould Boïdiya Stadium (Note: Al Merrikh play their home matches at Cheikha Ould Boïdiya Stadium in Nouakchott (Mauritania), instead of their regular stadium, Al-Merrikh Stadium, Omdurman, due to the Sudanese civil war.)	8,200
AS Douanes	Nouakchott	Cheikha Ould Boïdiya Stadium	8,200
AS Garde Nationale	Nouakchott	Nouakchott Olympic Stadium	20,000
AS Pompier	Nouakchott	Cheikha Ould Boïdiya Stadium	8,200
ASC GENDRIM	Nouakchott	Cheikha Ould Boïdiya Stadium	8,200
ASC Ksar	Nouakchott	Nouakchott Olympic Stadium	20,000
ASC SNIM	Nouadhibou	Nouadhibou Municipal Stadium	10,000
ASC Toulde	Kaédi	Kaédi Stadium	5,000
Chemal FC	Nouakchott	Nouakchott Olympic Stadium	20,000
FC Nouadhibou	Nouadhibou	Nouadhibou Municipal Stadium	10,000
FC N'Zidane	Atar	Stade d'Atar	2,000
FC Tevragh-Zeina	Nouakchott	Nouakchott Olympic Stadium	20,000
Inter Nouakchott	Nouakchott	Cheikha Ould Boïdiya Stadium	8,200
Kaédi FC	Kaédi	Kaédi Stadium	5,000
Nouakchott Kings	Nouakchott	Nouakchott Olympic Stadium	20,000

== Previous winners ==
Years	Champions
1976	AS Garde Nationale (1)
1977	AS Garde Nationale (2)
1978	AS Garde Nationale (3)
1979	AS Garde Nationale (4)
1980	Not held
1981	ASC Police (1)
1982	ASC Police (2)
1983	ACS Ksar (1)
1984	AS Garde Nationale (5)
1985	ACS Ksar (2)
1986	ASC Police (3)
1987	ASC Police (4)
1988	ASC Police (5)
1989	Not held
1990	ASC Police (6)
1991	ASC Police (7)
1992	ASC Ksar (3)
1993	ASC Ksar (4)
1994	AS Garde Nationale (6)
1995	ASC Sonalec (1)
1996	Not held
1997	Not held
1998	AS Garde Nationale (7)
1999	SDPA Rosso (1)
2000	ASC Mauritel (1)
2001	FC Nouadhibou (1)
2002	FC Nouadhibou (2)
2003	Al Nasr de Sebkha (1)
2004	ACS Ksar (5)
2005	Al Nasr de Sebkha (2)
2006	ASC Mauritel (2)
2007	Al Nasr de Sebkha (3)
2008	ASAC Concorde (1)
2009	ASC Snim (1)
2010	ASC Snim (2)
2010–11	FC Nouadhibou (3)
2011–12	FC Tevragh Zeïna (1)
2012–13	FC Nouadhibou (4)
2013–14	FC Nouadhibou (5)
2014–15	FC Tevragh Zeïna (2)
2015–16	FC Tevragh Zeïna (3)
2016–17	ASAC Concorde (2)
2017–18	FC Nouadhibou (6)
2018–19	FC Nouadhibou (7)
2019–20	FC Nouadhibou (8)
2020–21	FC Nouadhibou (9)
2021–22	FC Nouadhibou (10)
2022–23	FC Nouadhibou (11)
2023–24	FC Nouadhibou (12)
2024–25	FC Nouadhibou (13); Al-Hilal (1)
2025–26	FC Nouadhibou (14)

== Performance by club ==
Club	City	Titles	Last title
FC Nouadhibou	Nouadhibou	14	2025–26
AS Garde Nationale	Nouakchott	7	1998
ASC Police	Nouakchott	7	1991
ACS Ksar (includes ASC Sonader Ksar)	Nouakchott	5	2004
ASC Nasr de Sebkha	Nouakchott	3	2006–07
FC Tevragh-Zeina	Nouakchott	3	2015–16
ASAC Concorde	Nouakchott	2	2016–17
ASC Snim (includes CF Cansado)	Nouadhibou	2	2010
ASC Mauritel Mobile FC	Nouakchott	2	2005–06
SDPA Trarza FC	Rosso	1	1999
ASC Sonalec	Nouakchott	1	1995

== Individual statistics ==
=== Top goalscorers ===
Year	Best scorers	Team	Goals
2003	(Mauritania) Baïla Diallo	Ksar	18
2004	(Mauritania) Bouha Ould Brahim	Ksar	21
2005	(Mauritania) Bouha Ould Brahim	Ksar	14
2006–07	(Mauritania) Baïla Diallo	Ksar	21
2007–08	(Mauritania) Ely Cheikh Ould Voulany	Ksar	16
2012–13	(Ivory Coast) Wilfreid Kissito	Nouadhibou	18
2016–17	Abdoulaye Gaye Papaye		16
2016–17	(Mauritania) Hemeya Tanjy	Tidjikja	16
2018–19	(Mauritania) Mohamed Nouh Boilil	Police	13
2019–20	(Mauritania) Yatma Abdellahi Cheghrane	Tidjikja	14
2020–21	(Mauritania) Hemeya Tanjy	Nouadhibou	19
2021–22	(Mauritania) Sidi Cheick Maatale	Tevragh-Zeina	17
2022–23	(Mauritania) Hemeya Tanjy	Nouadhibou	21
2023–24	(Mauritania) Brahima Gadiaga	FC Nouadhibou	12
2024-25	(Mauritania) Cheikhna Semega	Kaedi	13
2024-25	(Mauritania) Ahmed Moctar	Tevragh Seina	13
2025-26	(Mauritania) Ahmed Moctar	Tevragh Seina	21
2025-26	(Mauritania) Mohamed Ekbad	N'Zidane	21

Most time goalscorers

- 3 times.
  - (Mauritania) Hemeya Tanjy (2016-17, 2020-21 and 2023-24)

=== Multiple hat-tricks ===
Rank	Country	Player	Hat-tricks
1	(Mauritania)	Ahmed Moctar	4
2	(Mauritania)	Hemeya Tanjy	2
3	(Mauritania)	O Bagili	1
3	(Mauritania)	M Jayid	1
3	(Mauritania)	Mohamed Ekbab	1
3	(Mauritania)	Jahé El Mina	1
3	(Mauritania)	Y Mbeh	1
3	(Mauritania)	Mohamed Nouh Beilil	1
3	(Mauritania)	Ely Cheick Ould Voulany	1
3	(Mauritania)	A Yatma	1

Most hat-tricks by a player in a single season

- 4 hat-tricks.
  - (Mauritania) Ahmed Moctar (2025-26).

== See also ==
- Mauritanian Cup
- Mauritanian Super Cup
