= FC Tevragh-Zeina =

Mauritanean association football club

- Full name: Football Club Tevragh-Zeïna
- Founded: 2005
- Ground: Stade Olympique; Nouakchott, Mauritania
- Capacity: 20,000
- Chairman: Moussa Ould Khairy
- Manager: Birama Gaye
- League: Mauritanean Premier League
- 2025–26: 7th

Football Club Tevragh-Zeïna (Arabic: نادي تفرغ زينة لكرة القدم) is a Mauritanian football club based in the Tevragh-Zeina district of Nouakchott. The club was founded in 2005.

== History ==
In 2009, ASC Tevragh-Zeïna reached the final of the Coupe du Président de la République but lost to ASAC Concorde 5–4 on penalties after the game ended 0–0. In 2010, they won the competition, beating FC Feu Mini 3–0 in the final. By winning the Cup, they qualified for the 2011 CAF Confederation Cup.

On February 28, 2011, Tevragh-Zeïna became the first club from Mauritania since 1994 to advance in continental competition after beating AS Real Bamako of Mali 1–0 on aggregate in the preliminary round of the 2011 CAF Confederation Cup. However, they were eliminated in the following round after losing 3–1 on aggregate to JS Kabylie of Algeria.

Tevragh-Zeina won the 2014–15 Mauritanian Premier League title after defeating Sélibaby 4–0 in the last round and overtaking their rivals Cansado who came second with a difference of one point. As a result, they qualified for the 2016 CAF Champions League.

== Achievements ==
- Mauritanian Premier League: 3
  - 2012, 2015, 2016
- Coupe du Président de la République: 5
  - Winner : 2010, 2011, 2012, 2016, 2020
  - Finalist : 2009
- Coupe de la Ligue Nationale: 1
  - Winner: 2017
- Mauritanian Super Cup: 3
  - Winner: 2010, 2015, 2016

== Performance in CAF competitions ==
- CAF Confederation Cup: 1 appearance

2011 – first round
2020 – second round

== Current squad ==
Note: Flags indicate national team as defined under FIFA eligibility rules; some limited exceptions apply. Players may hold more than one non-FIFA nationality.

No.	Pos.	Nation	Player
16	GK	MTN	Namori Diaw
6	DF	MTN	Cheikh Bilal Hadji
2	DF	MTN	Mohamed Walid Ould Afif
4	DF	MTN	Moussa Faye
19	DF	MTN	Yahya Cheikh Abdel Aziz
7	MF	MTN	Anass Saleh El-Din
8	MF	MTN	Bardass Zein El Abidin
99	FW	MTN	Lamine Ould Alaoui
9	MF	ALG	Waleed Cherif

No.	Pos.	Nation	Player
10	FW	MTN	Mohamed Ould Mokhtar
11	MF	MTN	Mohamed Ben Abd Moussa
12	DF	MTN	Babacar Ngollo Coulibaly
22	GK	MTN	Ibrahima Mamadou Sia
15	DF	MTN	Lamine Balla Chérif
23	MF	MTN	El Hadj Mokhtar
17	FW	MTN	Mohamed Yacoub Bâ
20	MF	MTN	Samba Abdallah Moussa

Managers
(Mauritania) Birama Gaye
