= ACS Ksar =

- Full name: Association Culturelle et Sportive du Ksar
- Founded: 1978; 48 years ago
- Ground: Stade Olympique; Nouakchott, Mauritania
- Capacity: 20,000
- Chairman: Cheikh Ould Gharraby
- Manager: N'diawar Ba
- League: Ligue 1
- 2025–26: 13th
Home colours	Away colours

Association Culturelle et Sportive du Ksar (Arabic: الجمعية الثقافية و الرياضية للكصر) known as ACS Ksar is a Mauritanian football club based in Nouakchott, the capital of the Mauritania. The club plays in the Ligue 1 Mauritania.

== History ==
The club was founded in 1978 in the Ksar neighborhood of Nouakchott. It was known in the 1990s under the name of ASC Sonader Ksar (Association Sportive et Culturelle Sonader Ksar) when it was sponsored by SONADER (Sociètè Nationale pour le Développement Rural).

Ksar won their first title in 1983, their second in 1983. The club won two consecutive titles in 1993, Ksar first appeared at the continental level in 1992. Ksar won their recent championship title in 2004 and a year later entered into their recent continental competition and their first and only as the CAF Champions League.

Ksar won their first cup title in 1979 and brought Ksar to their only continental appearance. Ksar (then also known as SONADER) won two consecutive cup titles in 1994, the club did not enter the continental cup competition. Their recent cup title was won in 2014. Ksar won their only Super Cup title in 2014 as Ksar entered as cup winner.

Ksar appeared once in the Arab Champions' League (now the UAFA Club Cup) in the 2005–06 season.

At the continentals, all clubs they challenged were from the westernmost part and the northernmost part of the continent, two are sub-Saharan clubs.

== Stadium ==
Currently the team plays at the 10,000 capacity Stade Olympique (Nouakchott).

== Honours ==
- Ligue 1
  - Champions (5): 1983, 1985, 1992, 1993, 2004
- Coupe du Président de la République
  - Winners (5): 1979, 1993, 1994, 2014, 2015
- Mauritanean Super Cup
  - Winners (1): 2014

== League and cup history ==
=== Performance in CAF competitions ===
Ksar's results in CAF competition
Season	Competition	Qualification method	Round	Opposition	Home	Away	Aggregate
1980	African Cup Winners' Cup	Mauritanian cup winners	First round	(Algeria) NA Hussein-Dey	1–0	0–7	1–7
1993	African Cup of Champions Clubs	Mauritanean champions	Preliminary Round	(Mali) Djoliba AC	1–1	1–0	1–2
1994	African Cup of Champions Clubs	Mauritanean champions	Preliminary Round	(Cape Verde) Académica do Sal	2–0	0–0	2–0
1994	African Cup of Champions Clubs	Mauritanean champions	First round	(Algeria) MC Oran	2–0	4–0	2–4
2005	CAF Champions League	Mauritanean champions	Preliminary Round	(Morocco) FAR Rabat	1–0	4–0	1–4

=== Performance in UAFA competitions ===
- Arab Cup of Champions Clubs / Arab Champions League / UAFA Club Cup: 1 appearance

2005-06 – First round

=== Positions ===
- 2012–13: 2nd (championship), Semi-finalist (cup)

== Statistics ==
- Best position: First round (continental)
- Best position at cup competitions: First Round (continental)
- Appearances at a Super Cup competition: 2 (national)
- Total matches played at the continental competitions: 10
  - Total matches played at home: 5
  - Total matches played away: 5
- Total number of wins at the continental competitions: 2
  - Total home wins: 2
- Total draws at the continental competitions: 3
  - Total home draws: 2
  - Total away draws: 1
- Total number of goals scored at the continental competitions: 7
- Total goals scored at the Super Cup: 2
