= ASAC Concorde =

- Full name: Association Sportive Artistique et Culturelle de la Concorde
- Nickname(s): Bleu et Blanc
- Founded: 1979
- Ground: Stade Olympique; Nouakchott, Mauritania
- Capacity: 20,000
- League: Ligue 2
- 2023–2024: 13th in Mauritanian Premier League (relegated)

Association Sportive Artistique et Culturelle de la Concorde (Arabic: الجمعية الرياضية الفنية و الثقافية للوئام), simply known as ASAC Concorde, is a Mauritanian football club based in Nouakchott.

== History ==
ASAC Concorde was founded in Nouakchott in 1979. It's one of the oldest clubs in Mauritania.

=== Crest ===
Former logo

Present logo

== Honours ==
- Mauritanian Premier League
  - Champions (2): 2008, 2017
- Coupe du Président de la République
  - Winners (1): 2009
  - Runners-up (3): 2012, 2014, 2016
- Coupe de la Ligue Nationale
  - Winners (1): 2012
  - Runners-up (3): 2015, 2018, 2019
- Mauritanian Super Cup
  - Winners (2): 2012, 2017
  - Runners-up (1): 2016

== Performance in CAF competitions ==
- CAF Champions League (with 1 appearance)

2018 – Preliminary Round

- CAF Confederation Cup (with 2 appearances)

2005 – Round of 32
2007 – Preliminary Round
