= Nouakchott Olympic Stadium =

Stadium in Nouakchott, Mauritania

Coordinates: 18°6′17″N 15°59′7″W

Olympic Stadium
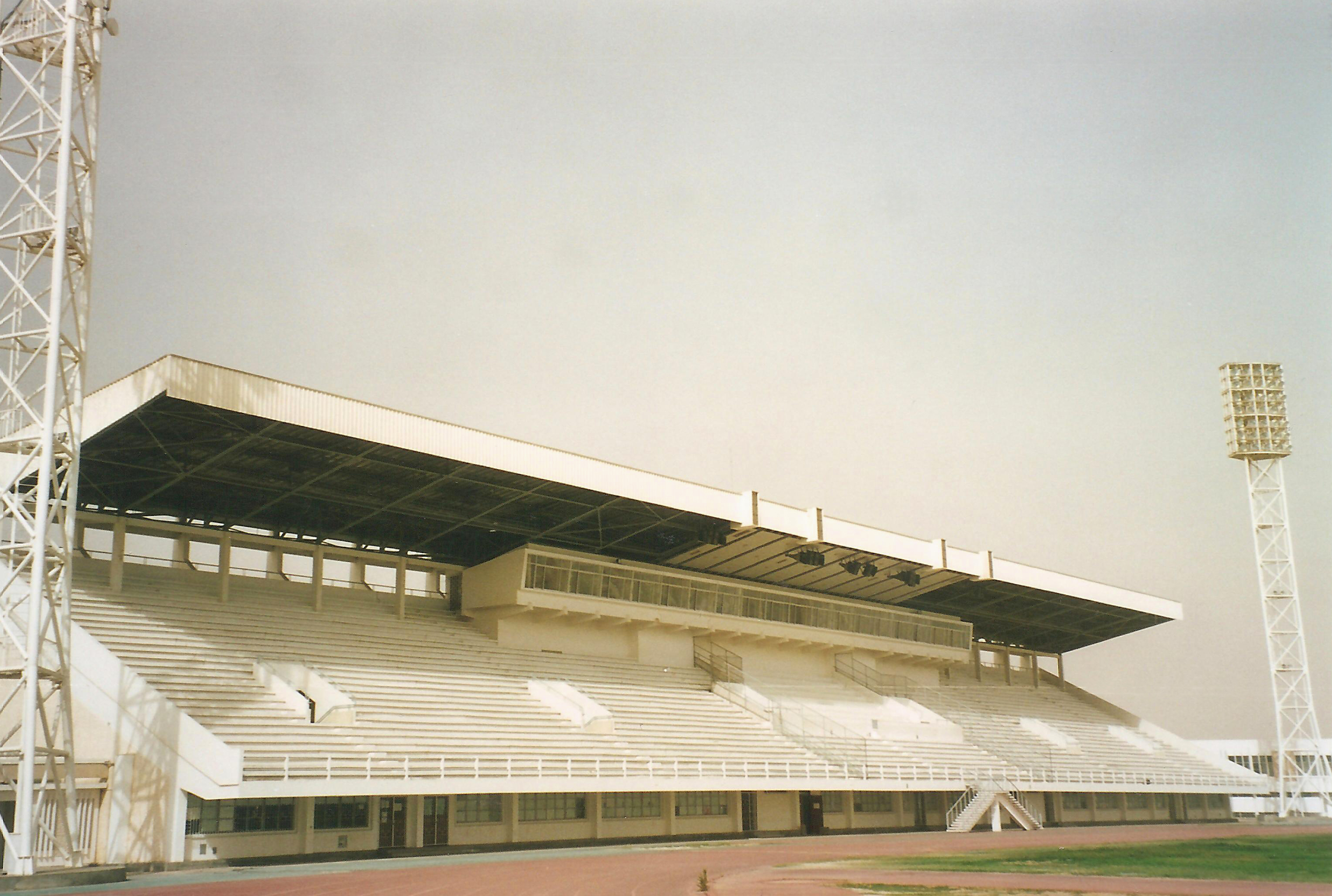
- Interactive map of Olympic Stadium
- Full name: Stade Olympique de Nouakchott
- Location: Nouakchott, Mauritania
- Capacity: 10,000
- Surface: Artificial turf

Construction
- Built: 23 January 1980
- Opened: 14 July 1983
- Renovated: 2002, 2020

Tenant
- Mauritania national football team

The Olympic Stadium (Arabic: الملعب الأولمبي) is a multi-purpose stadium in Nouakchott, Mauritania. It is used mostly for football matches and has a capacity of 10,000. It also has an athletics track.

The Olympic Stadium is used by the Mauritania national football team.
