= Outline of Mauritania =

Overview of and topical guide to Mauritania

The Flag of Mauritania

The Seal of Mauritania

The location of Mauritania

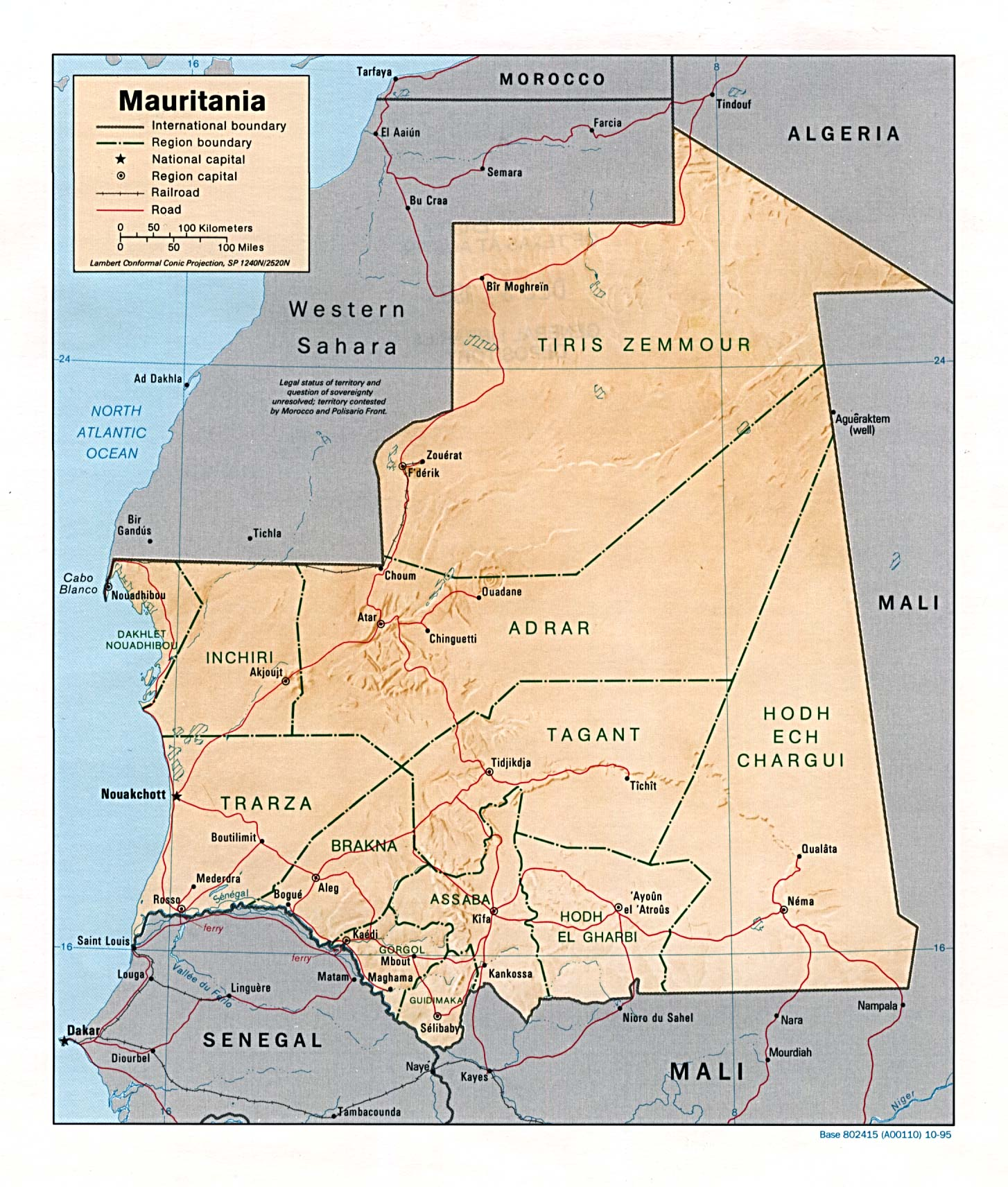
An enlargeable relief map of the Islamic Republic of Mauritania

The following outline is provided as an overview of and topical guide to Mauritania:

Mauritania – sovereign country located in West Africa. Mauritania is bordered by the Atlantic Ocean on the west, by Senegal on the southwest, by Mali on the east and southeast, by Algeria on the northeast, and by the Morocco-controlled Western Sahara on the northwest. It is named after the ancient Berber kingdom of Mauretania. The capital and largest city is Nouakchott, located on the Atlantic coast.

== General reference ==
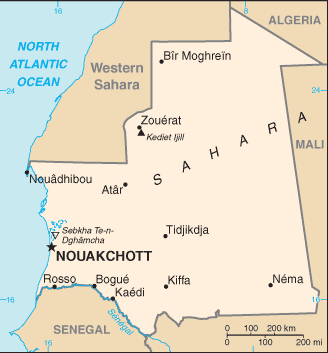
An enlargeable basic map of Mauritania

- Pronunciation: /mɔːrɪˈteɪniə/
- Common English country name: Mauritania
- Official English country name: The Islamic Republic of Mauritania
- Common endonym(s):
- Official endonym(s):
- Adjectival(s): Mauritanian
- Demonym(s): Mauritanian(s)
- ISO country codes: MR, MRT, 478
- ISO region codes: See ISO 3166-2:MR
- Internet country code top-level domain: .mr

== Geography of Mauritania ==
Geography of Mauritania

- Mauritania is: a country
- Population of Mauritania: 3,124,000 - 135th most populous country
- Area of Mauritania: 1,030,700 km^{2}
- Atlas of Mauritania

=== Location ===
- Mauritania is situated within the following regions:
  - Northern Hemisphere and Western Hemisphere
  - Africa
    - Sahara Desert
    - North Africa
    - West Africa
- Time zone: Coordinated Universal Time UTC+00
- Extreme points of Mauritania
  - High: Kediet ej Jill 915 m (3,002 ft)
  - Low: Sebkha de Ndrhamcha −5 m (−16 ft)
- Land boundaries: 5,074 km

Mali 2,237 km
Western Sahara 1,564 km
Senegal 813 km
Algeria 463 km

- Coastline: 754 km

=== Environment of Mauritania ===
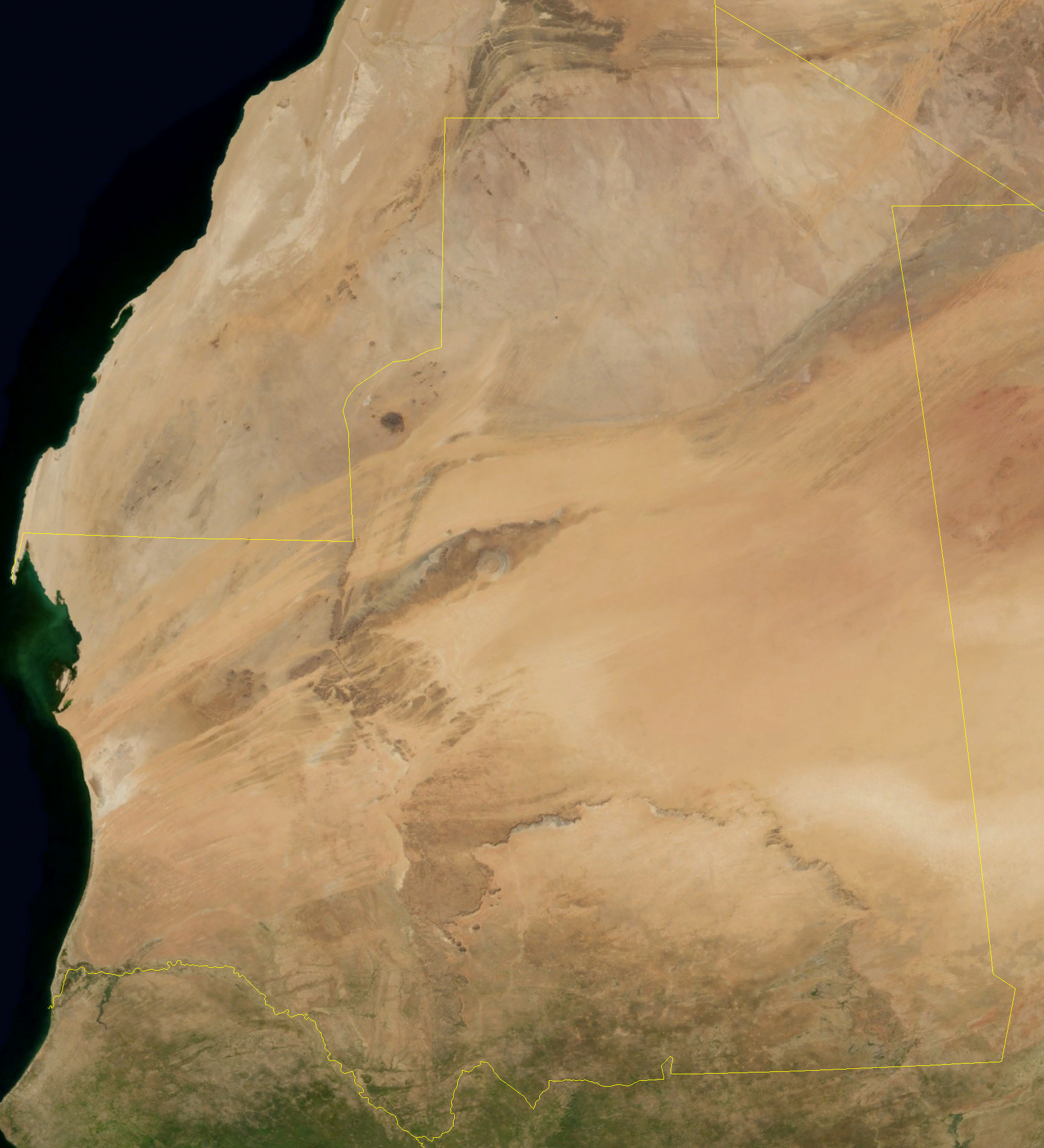
An enlargeable satellite image of Mauritania

- Climate of Mauritania
- Ecoregions in Mauritania
- Wildlife of Mauritania
  - Fauna of Mauritania
    - Birds of Mauritania
    - Mammals of Mauritania

==== Natural geographic features of Mauritania ====
- Glaciers in Mauritania: none
- Rivers of Mauritania
- World Heritage Sites in Mauritania

=== Regions of Mauritania ===
Regions of Mauritania

==== Ecoregions of Mauritania ====
List of ecoregions in Mauritania

- Ecoregions in Mauritania

==== Administrative divisions of Mauritania ====
Administrative divisions of Mauritania

- Regions of Mauritania
  - Departments of Mauritania

===== Departments of Mauritania =====
Departments of Mauritania

===== Settlements in Mauritania =====
- Capital of Mauritania: Nouakchott
- Cities of Mauritania

=== Demography of Mauritania ===
Demographics of Mauritania

== Government and politics of Mauritania ==
Politics of Mauritania

- Form of government:
- Capital of Mauritania: Nouakchott
- Elections in Mauritania
- Political parties in Mauritania

=== Branches of the government of Mauritania ===
Government of Mauritania

==== Executive branch of the government of Mauritania ====
- Head of state: President of Mauritania, Mohamed Ould Ghazouani
- Head of government: Prime Minister of Mauritania, Mokhtar Ould Djay

==== Legislative branch of the government of Mauritania ====
- Parliament of Mauritania (bicameral)
  - Upper house: Senate of Mauritania
  - Lower house: National Assembly of Mauritania

==== Judicial branch of the government of Mauritania ====
Court system of Mauritania

=== Foreign relations of Mauritania ===
Foreign relations of Mauritania

- Diplomatic missions in Mauritania
- Diplomatic missions of Mauritania

==== International organization membership of Mauritania ====
The Islamic Republic of Mauritania is a member of:

- African, Caribbean, and Pacific Group of States (ACP)
- African Development Bank Group (AfDB)
- African Union (AU)
- Arab Bank for Economic Development in Africa (ABEDA)
- Arab Fund for Economic and Social Development (AFESD)
- Arab Maghreb Union (AMU)
- Arab Monetary Fund (AMF)
- Council of Arab Economic Unity (CAEU)
- Food and Agriculture Organization (FAO)
- Group of 77 (G77)
- International Atomic Energy Agency (IAEA)
- International Bank for Reconstruction and Development (IBRD)
- International Civil Aviation Organization (ICAO)
- International Criminal Police Organization (Interpol)
- International Development Association (IDA)
- International Federation of Red Cross and Red Crescent Societies (IFRCS)
- International Finance Corporation (IFC)
- International Fund for Agricultural Development (IFAD)
- International Labour Organization (ILO)
- International Maritime Organization (IMO)
- International Monetary Fund (IMF)
- International Olympic Committee (IOC)
- International Organization for Migration (IOM)
- International Red Cross and Red Crescent Movement (ICRM)
- International Telecommunication Union (ITU)
- International Telecommunications Satellite Organization (ITSO)
- International Trade Union Confederation (ITUC)
- Inter-Parliamentary Union (IPU)
- Islamic Development Bank (IDB)
- League of Arab States (LAS)
- Multilateral Investment Guarantee Agency (MIGA)
- Nonaligned Movement (NAM)
- Organisation internationale de la Francophonie (OIF)
- Organisation of Islamic Cooperation (OIC)
- Organisation for the Prohibition of Chemical Weapons (OPCW)
- United Nations (UN)
- United Nations Conference on Trade and Development (UNCTAD)
- United Nations Educational, Scientific, and Cultural Organization (UNESCO)
- United Nations Industrial Development Organization (UNIDO)
- Universal Postal Union (UPU)
- World Confederation of Labour (WCL)
- World Customs Organization (WCO)
- World Federation of Trade Unions (WFTU)
- World Health Organization (WHO)
- World Intellectual Property Organization (WIPO)
- World Meteorological Organization (WMO)
- World Tourism Organization (UNWTO)
- World Trade Organization (WTO)

=== Law and order in Mauritania ===
Law of Mauritania

- Constitution of Mauritania
- Crime in Mauritania
- Human rights in Mauritania
  - LGBT rights in Mauritania
  - Freedom of religion in Mauritania
- Law enforcement in Mauritania

=== Military of Mauritania ===
Military of Mauritania

- Command
  - Commander-in-chief:
- Forces
  - Army of Mauritania
  - Air Force of Mauritania

=== Local government in Mauritania ===
Local government in Mauritania

== History of Mauritania ==
History of Mauritania

== Culture of Mauritania ==
Culture of Mauritania

- Cuisine of Mauritania
- Languages of Mauritania
- National symbols of Mauritania
  - Coat of arms of Mauritania
  - Flag of Mauritania
  - National Anthem of Mauritania
- Public holidays in Mauritania
- Religion in Mauritania
  - Christianity in Mauritania
  - Islam in Mauritania
- World Heritage Sites in Mauritania

=== Art in Mauritania ===
- Cinema of Mauritania
- Music of Mauritania

=== Sports in Mauritania ===
Sports in Mauritania

- Football in Mauritania
- Mauritania at the Olympics

== Economy and infrastructure of Mauritania ==
Economy of Mauritania

- Economic rank, by nominal GDP (2007): 151st (one hundred and fifty first)
- Agriculture in Mauritania
- Communications in Mauritania
  - Internet in Mauritania
- Companies of Mauritania
- Currency of Mauritania: Ouguiya
  - ISO 4217: MRO
- Health care in Mauritania
- Mining in Mauritania
- Tourism in Mauritania
- Transport in Mauritania
  - Airports in Mauritania
  - Rail transport in Mauritania

== Education in Mauritania ==
Education in Mauritania

== Health in Mauritania ==
Health in Mauritania

== See also ==
Mauritania

- List of international rankings
- List of Mauritania-related topics
- Member state of the United Nations
- Outline of Africa
- Outline of geography
