= Television in Mauritania =

Television in Mauritania was introduced in 1980 with experimental broadcasts, with regular broadcasts starting in 1982.

Télédiffusion de Mauritanie offers private and public channels through satellite television in the Arabsat satellites Badr-4 and Arabsat-5C. There is also easy access to pan-Arab and European satellite television.

== History ==
Television in Mauritania started as a project in 1980, with regular broadcasts starting with the Office of Radio and Television of Mauritania (ORTM) in 1982, broadcasting news bulletins and other programming. On 10 July 1984, television in Mauritania as a whole began to appear as autonomous due to Iraqi aid, as it began broadcasting from its own studios, independent from its radio counterpart. In the same year (1984), the channel switched to color broadcasting.

Mass media in Mauritania was a state monopoly until a law liberalising the audiovisual space in the country passed in the National Assembly on 2 July 2010, with the first private media being authorised by the High Authority for Press and Audiovisual (HAPA) on 23 August 2011.

== Main channels ==
This is a list of TV channels based in Mauritania.

Channel	Category	Owned by	Launched	HD
El Mouritaniya	Generalistic	Television of Mauritania	10 July 1984	Yes
El Mouritaniya 2	Generalistic	Television of Mauritania	13 October 2007	No
El Mahadra	Religious programming	Radio Mauritania	2 March 2014	Yes
Arriadia	Sports programming	Television of Mauritania	28 November 2017	No
Athagavia	Cultural programming	Television of Mauritania	1 December 2017	No
Al Barlemania	Parliament	Television of Mauritania/National Assembly	1 May 2019	No
El Mourabitoun	Generalistic	El Mourabitoun	24 August 2011	No
Sahel TV	Generalistic	Sahel TV	24 August 2011	Yes
Chinguit TV	Generalistic	Chinguit TV	24 August 2011	No
El Wataniya	Generalistic	El Wataniya TV	24 August 2011	No
DAVA TV	Generalistic	DAVA TV	1 January 2021	No
El Medina TV	Generalistic	El Medina TV	3 December 2021	Yes
El Oussra TV	Family programming	Minister of Social Action, Children and Families	9 March 2023	Yes
Ghimem TV	Generalistic	Independent Channel of Mauritania	12 May 2024	Yes
Sahara 24	News programming	SaharaMedias	10 June 2024	Yes

== See also ==
- Media of Mauritania
- Telecommunications in Mauritania
