= Hôpital Sabah =

Hospital Sabah

Geography
- Location: Nouakchott, Mauritania
- Coordinates: 18°5′11″N 15°59′26″W

Links
- Website: cnc.mr
- Lists: Hospitals in Mauritania

Hôpital Sabah (English: Sabah Hospital) is a hospital in Nouakchott, Mauritania. It is located on the Avenue Gamal Abdel Nasser, adjacent (west) to the Grand National Hospital of Mauritania, opposite the Ministry of Energy headquarters and to the east of the Réserve naturelle de sel iodé.

The hospital is possibly associated with the National Cardiology Center. A medical organization Carrefour Sabah is located near where the Sabah Hospital is purported to be located and Carrefour Sabah also appears in connection with National Cardiology Center.
