= Centre neuro-psychiatrique de Nouakchott =

Neuropsychiatry Center Nouakchott

Geography
- Location: Avenue Gamal Abdel Nasser, west of the Ministry of Energy headquarters and the Grand National Hospital of Mauritania, Nouakchott, Mauritania
- Coordinates: 18°4′57″N 15°59′55″W

Organisation
- Type: Specialist

Services
- Speciality: Neuropsychiatry

History
- Founded: 1991

Links
- Lists: Hospitals in Mauritania

Centre Neuro-Psychiatrique de Nouakchott (English: Neuropsychiatry Center Nouakchott) is a psychiatric hospital in Nouakchott, Mauritania.

It is located on the Avenue Gamal Abdel Nasser, west of the Ministry of Energy headquarters and the Grand National Hospital of Mauritania and opposite the Réserve naturelle de sel iodé.
