= Radio Nationale =

Radio Nationale may refer to:

- Radio Nationale (France): a collaborationist radio station active in Vichy France between 1940 and 1944.
- Radio Nationale (Mauritania): the national radio of Mauritania.
