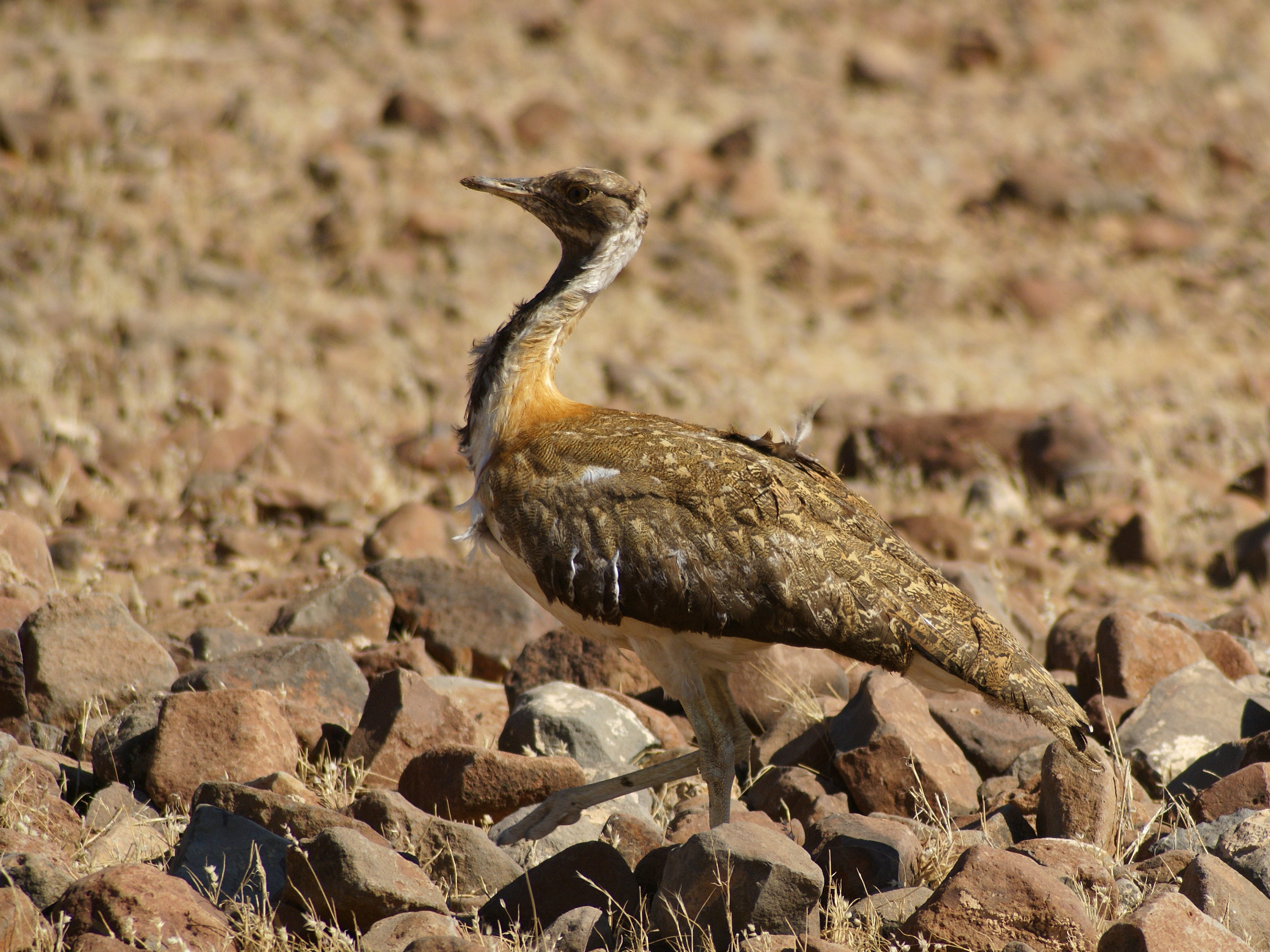

Conservation status
- Endangered (IUCN 3.1)
- CITES Appendix II

Scientific classification
- Kingdom: Animalia
- Phylum: Chordata
- Class: Aves
- Order: Otidiformes
- Family: Otididae
- Genus: Neotis
- Species: N. ludwigii

Binomial name
- Neotis ludwigii (Rüppell, 1837)

= Ludwig's bustard =

Species of bird

Ludwig's bustard (Neotis ludwigii) is a species of bird in the bustard family, and named after Baron von Ludwig. It is a medium-to-large sized species.

== Description ==
The Ludwig's bustard can weigh from 3 to 7.3 kg (6.6 to 16.1 lb), with a mean of 6.3 kg (14 lb) for the much larger male and 3.4 kg (7.5 lb) for the female. Length ranges from 76 to 85 cm (30 to 33 in) in females and 80 to 95 cm (31 to 37 in) in males.

The bird's face and front neck are coloured grey-brown while the back of the neck and face is white. The nape of the neck is coloured a dull orange. Females and juveniles vary from the male adults by their smaller size and slightly lighter coloured front neck and face.

The Ludwig's bustard is frequently confused with Stanley's bustard (more commonly known as the Denham's bustard), Neotis denhami. The Denham's bustard, however, has a paler grey on its face and front neck, a browner nape, and is also marked with unique crown stripes of black and white on its head.

== Taxonomy ==
Ludwig's bustard is a member of the Otididae family, which comprises the bustards. General bustard characteristics include short, stout bills; camouflaged bodies; and dwelling in savannas and grasslands.

Ludwig's bustard is part of the African bustard genus known as Neotis, which has three other species besides Ludwig's bustard.

== Habitat and Distribution ==
Typical of a bustard, Ludwig's bustard lives in grasslands and in semi-arid regions. Their range is typically confined to the Western side of Southern Africa, in Western South Africa, Namibia, and sometimes in Botswana. The total range of the species is roughly 380,000 km^{2} (146,719 sq mi).

In the 1980s, the total population of Ludwig's bustards was estimated to be 56,000–81,000. Recent population estimates of Ludwig's bustards say that there are about 114,000 of the birds in South Africa alone.

It was commonly believed that the bustards tended to follow rainfall patterns, but this has since been disputed by newer research. However, there does appear to be significant evidence that these birds do prefer to live in modified habitats such as agricultural fields and pastures.

Ludwig's bustards do not form large flocks, tending to be seen in groups with an average size of 2.13 individuals in summer and 3.56 individuals in winter.

== Behavior ==
=== Vocalizations ===
The mating call of the Ludwig's bustard is a deep 'bloop' noise. Not a lot of more specific information on the vocalizations of this species is available.

=== Diet ===
Ludwig's bustards have a varied diet. They can eat small animals on the ground such as insects and vertebrates. Their preferred insect to consume is the locust, which are common in their habitat. They are also capable of consuming flowers and seeds.

=== Reproduction ===
Ludwig's bustards live in large, desolate regions which are difficult to access for scientific studies. They are also easily disrupted by scientists seeking to gather information on them. As such, not much information is available for the reproductive behaviors of Ludwig's bustards, but they have been reported to breed during the month of March in Namibia.

== Powerline Collisions ==
A very pertinent issue to conservation efforts of the Ludwig's bustard is their overwhelming tendency to fatally collide with powerlines within their habitats. This issue is mainly due to the visual blind spots of bustards being positioned such that when they look down a small degree while in flight, they are no longer able to detect obstacles in their flightpath.

This collision problem is of such a dire magnitude that the future of the species may be in jeopardy because of it. An estimated 4,000–11,900 Ludwig's bustards are killed each year through these collisions.

To help with the conservation of the species in the face of this threat, more detailed information and statistics of the Ludwig's bustards are necessary for any significant plan of action to be made. In the meantime, future increases in infrastructure construction and power grid upgrades in the habitats of Ludwig's bustards will naturally pose an increasing threat to the Ludwig's bustard population.
