= Institut National de Recherches en Sante Publique =

Research institute in Nouakchott, Mauritania

Coordinates: 18°5′8″N 15°59′15″W

Institut National de Recherches en Sante Publique is a national research institute in Nouakchott, Mauritania. It is located on the Avenue Gamal Abdel Nasser, opposite the Grand National Hospital of Mauritania and just east of the Ministry of Energy headquarters.
