= Salka Mint Sneid =

Mauritanian journalist

- السالكة منت اسنيد
- Born: 1958 or 1959
- Died: 14 February 2020 (aged 61)
- Occupation(s): Journalist; Radio presenter
- Employer: Radio Mauritanie
- Known for: President of the Women's Network of Journalists of Mauritania
- Spouse: Ahmedou Ould Abdel Kader

Salka Mint Sneid (Hassaniyya: السالكة منت اسنيد; c. 1958 or 1959 – 14 February 2020) was a Mauritanian radio presenter and journalist, who was twice president of the Women's Network of Journalists of Mauritania. Sneid was employed by Radio Mauritanie. In 2012, she was elected president of the Council for Self-Regulation of the Written Press, an advisory body to the High Authority for Media and Audiovisual. She also published a newspaper called El Ilham. She was also a member of the Advocacy Initiative Group for Women's Political Participation.

Sneid advocated for a closer relationship between mass media and the Ministry of Health and Social Affairs, based on a media partnership that raised awareness of polio vaccination, and was an advocate for the Arabic language in Mauritania.

She died on 14 February 2020, aged 61. Prior to her death, the costs of her treatment were paid for by the President of Mauritania Mohamed Ould Ghazouani. The National Women's Commission of the Union for the Republic organized an evening of reflection and remembrance in her honour, led by the commission's president Emet-ha Mint El Hadj. She posthumously was awarded the National Recognition Medal of Mauritania.

Her husband was the poet and politician Ahmedou Ould Abdel Kader.
