= Mariem mint Beyrouk =

Mauritanian filmmaker (born 1963)

- Born: October 23, 1963; Atar
- Occupation: Filmmaker

Mariem mint Beyrouk (born October 23, 1963) is a Mauritanian television director and filmmaker, best known for the documentary Les chercheuses de pierres (2009).

Mariem mint Beyrouk was born on October 23, 1963 in Atar, Mauritania. She learned about television broadcasting working at France 3 and TDF in France, the Arab States Broadcasting Union in Damascus, and the Centre Africain de Perfectionnement des Journalistes et Communicateurs (CAPJC) in Tunis. She joined Television of Mauritania (TVM) in 1983, producing many television programs, including Kelimat we anguam and Eraey etebi. She also served as president of the Association of Mauritanian Women of the Image (AMAFI).

Her film Les chercheuses de pierres ("Women in Search of Stones", 2009) is a documentary about cooperatives of women in Zouérat who travel hundreds of miles over the course of weeks to gather stones to make jewelry. It won a prize at Afrique Taille XL film festival in Brussels.
