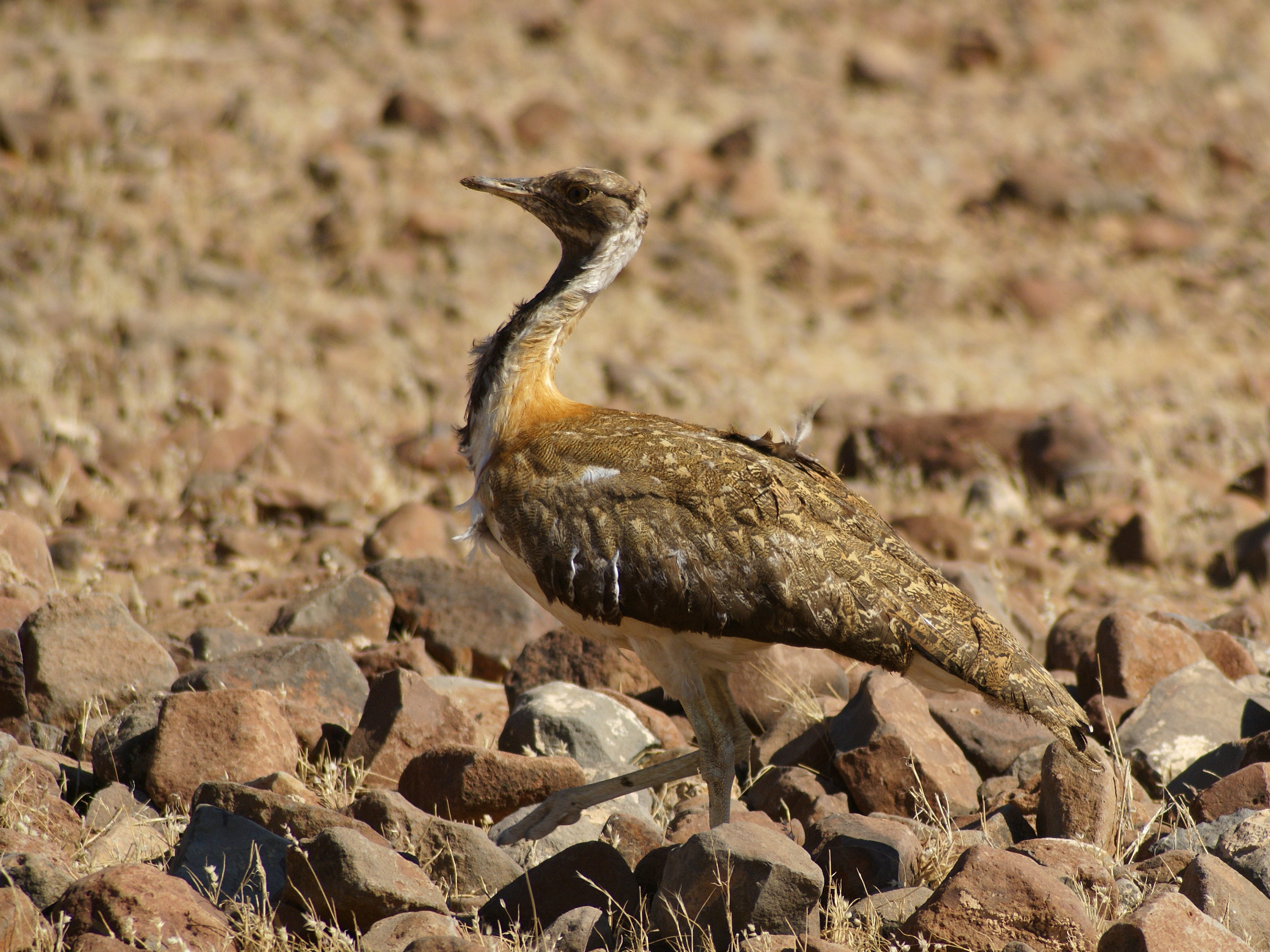
- Ludwig's bustard (Neotis ludwigii)

Scientific classification
- Kingdom: Animalia
- Phylum: Chordata
- Class: Aves
- Order: Otidiformes
- Family: Otididae
- Genus: Neotis; Sharpe, 1893

= Neotis =

Genus of birds

Neotis is a bird genus in the family Otididae. It contains the following species:

Image	Scientific name	Common name	Distribution
	Neotis heuglinii	Heuglin's bustard	Djibouti, Eritrea, Ethiopia, Kenya, and Somalia
	Neotis ludwigii	Ludwig's bustard	Angola, Botswana, Lesotho, Namibia, and South Africa
	Neotis nuba	Nubian bustard	Burkina Faso, Cameroon, Chad, Mali, Mauritania, Niger, Nigeria, and Sudan
	Neotis denhami	Denham's bustard	Sub-Saharan Africa
