= Réserve naturelle de sel iodé =

Nature reserve in Mauritania

Coordinates: 18°5′9″N 15°59′50″W

Réserve naturelle de sel iodé - literally: natural reserve of iodised salt - is a small nature reserve in Nouakchott, Mauritania. It is located on the Avenue Gamal Abdel Nasser, near the Ministry of Energy headquarters and opposite the Centre neuro-psychiatrique de Nouakchott, north of the urban commune of Sebkha, and it is constituted out of a sebkha (a semi-arid salted wetland).
