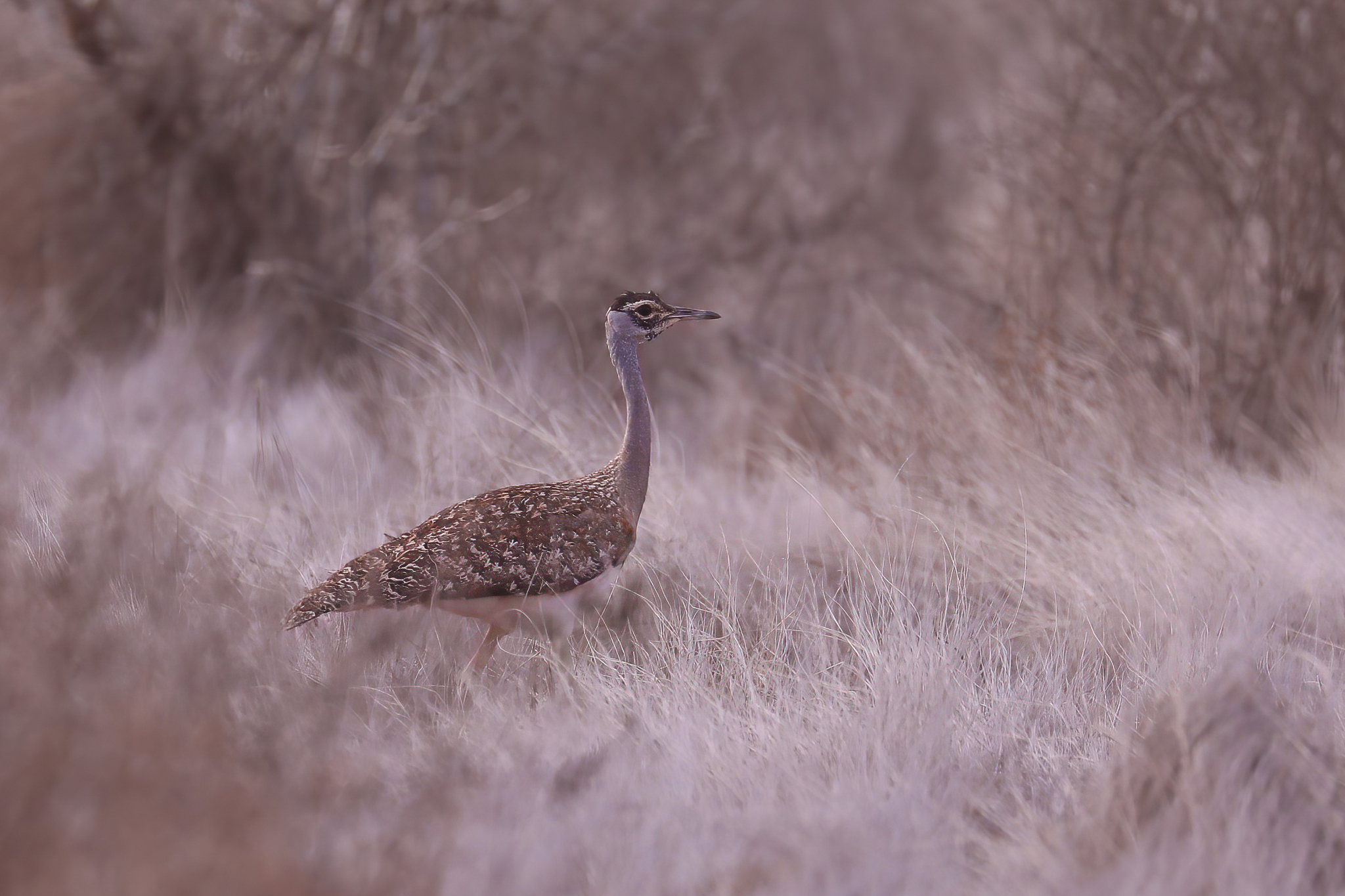
- Female Heuglin's bustard Neotis heuglinii

Conservation status
- Least Concern (IUCN 3.1)
- CITES Appendix II

Scientific classification
- Kingdom: Animalia
- Phylum: Chordata
- Class: Aves
- Order: Otidiformes
- Family: Otididae
- Genus: Neotis
- Species: N. heuglinii

Binomial name
- Neotis heuglinii (Hartlaub, 1859)

Synonyms
- Otis heuglinii

= Heuglin's bustard =

Species of bird

Heuglin's bustard (Neotis heuglinii) is a species of bird in the bustard family.

The bird was initially described by Theodor von Heuglin and Gustav Hartlaub, although only Hartlaub is normally credited as the author. Hartlaub, a curator at the Bremen Museum of Natural History, coined the species epithet for Heuglin, who collected the specimens and made measurements in the field near Somalia.

== Description ==
It is a fairly large species, at up to 89 cm (35 in) in length. The males weigh 4–8 kg (8.8–17.6 lb) and the much smaller females weigh 2.6–3 kg (5.7–6.6 lb). Other than size, sexes differ considerably in appearance. The striking male has a large back marking over the crown down the face to the chin with a bluish-grey neck. On the male, a chestnut band on the lower chest which is separated from the white belly by a thin black band. The female is much more of a subdued brownish color overall, with no bold black markings and has a face lined with faint slate-gray markings. In flight, the species reveals a white primary wedge on the otherwise dark upperwing, a feature obscured when the species is standing.

The Heuglin's bustard is found in Djibouti, Eritrea, Ethiopia, Kenya, and Somalia. It occurs in pairs or small groups in arid or semi-arid grasslands, even ranging into desert-edge.
