= Khadijetou Lekweiry =

Mauritanian Biologist

- Education: Cadi Ayyad University
- Alma mater: University of Nouakchott
- Awards: L'Oréal-UNESCO Women in Science Awards

Khadijetou Mint Lekweiry is a Mauritanian biologist and virologist, specializing in malaria transmission in her country. In 2009 Lekweiry was awarded a L'Oréal-UNESCO Women in Science Awards to support her research, related to the transmission of malaria in Nouakchott, hosted between the Institut de Recherche pour le Développement in Dakar and the University of Nouakchott Al Aasriya. Simultaneously she was pursuing her doctoral research at Cadi Ayyad University in Morocco.

In 2015, together with a group of colleagues, Lekweiry reported that the species Aedes aegypti was seen for the first time in Mauritania. In 2019, she reported the first appearance of the Plasmodium vivax parasite in Atar, a town in the north of Mauritania.

== Selected publications ==
- Rougeron V, Elguero E, Arnathau C, Acuña Hidalgo B, Durand P, Houze S, et al. (2020) Human Plasmodium vivax diversity, population structure and evolutionary origin. PLoS Negl Trop Dis 14(3): e0008072.
- Ould Lemrabott, M.A., Le Goff, G., Kengne, P. et al. First report of Anopheles (Cellia) multicolor during a study of tolerance to salinity of Anopheles arabiensis larvae in Nouakchott, Mauritania. Parasites Vectors 13, 522 (2020)
- Khadijetou Mint Lekweiry, Mohamed Salem Ould Ahmedou Salem, Khyarhoum Ould Brahim, Mohamed Aly Ould Lemrabott, Cécile Brengues, Ousmane Faye, Frédéric Simard, Ali Ould Mohamed Salem Boukhary "Aedes aegypti (Diptera: Culicidae) in Mauritania: First Report on the Presence of the Arbovirus Mosquito Vector in Nouakchott," Journal of Medical Entomology, 52(4), 730-733
- Ould Ahmedou Salem, M.S., Mint Lekweiry, K., Bouchiba, H. et al. Characterization of Plasmodium falciparum genes associated with drug resistance in Hodh Elgharbi, a malaria hotspot near Malian–Mauritanian border. Malar J 16, 140 (2017).
