= Wilaya de Nouakchott =

Government building in Nouakchott, Mauritania

Coordinates: 18°5′14″N 15°58′17″W

Wilaya de Nouakchott is a government administrative building located in Nouakchott, Mauritania. It is located on the Avenue Gamal Abdel Nasser, just west of the headquarters of Air Mauritania and opposite the headquarters of Radio Nationale.
