= Ophthalmological Hospital (Nouakchott) =

Geography
- Location: Northeast of the Presidential Palace, Nouakchott, Mauritania
- Coordinates: 18°6′18″N 15°57′43″W

Organisation
- Type: Specialist

Services
- Speciality: Ophthalmology

Links
- Lists: Hospitals in Mauritania

The Ophthalmological Hospital is an Ophthalmology hospital in northeastern Nouakchott, Mauritania. It is located to the northeast of the Presidential Palace.
