= Nouadhibou Regional Hospital =

Coordinates: 20°57′36″N 17°2′3″W

Geography
- Location: Nouadhibou, Dakhlet Nouadhibou Region, Mauritania

Organisation
- Type: General

Services
- Beds: 250

History
- Founded: 2017

Links
- Lists: Hospitals in Mauritania

Nouadhibou Regional Hospital (French: Hôpital Regional de Nouadhibou) is a regional hospital in Nouadhibou, Mauritania. Construction started in 2012 and the foundation stone was laid by the president of Mauritania Mohamed Ould Abdel Aziz.

Financial Help came from the SNIM Foundation. It was opened in 2017 and is staffed with about 50 Cuban Doctors and has 250 in patient beds.
