= University of Nouakchott Al Aasriya =

Public university in Nouakchott, Mauritania

Coordinates: 18.0890°N 15.9672°W

University of Nouakchott
- Université de Nouakchott Al Aasriya جــامعة نواكشوط
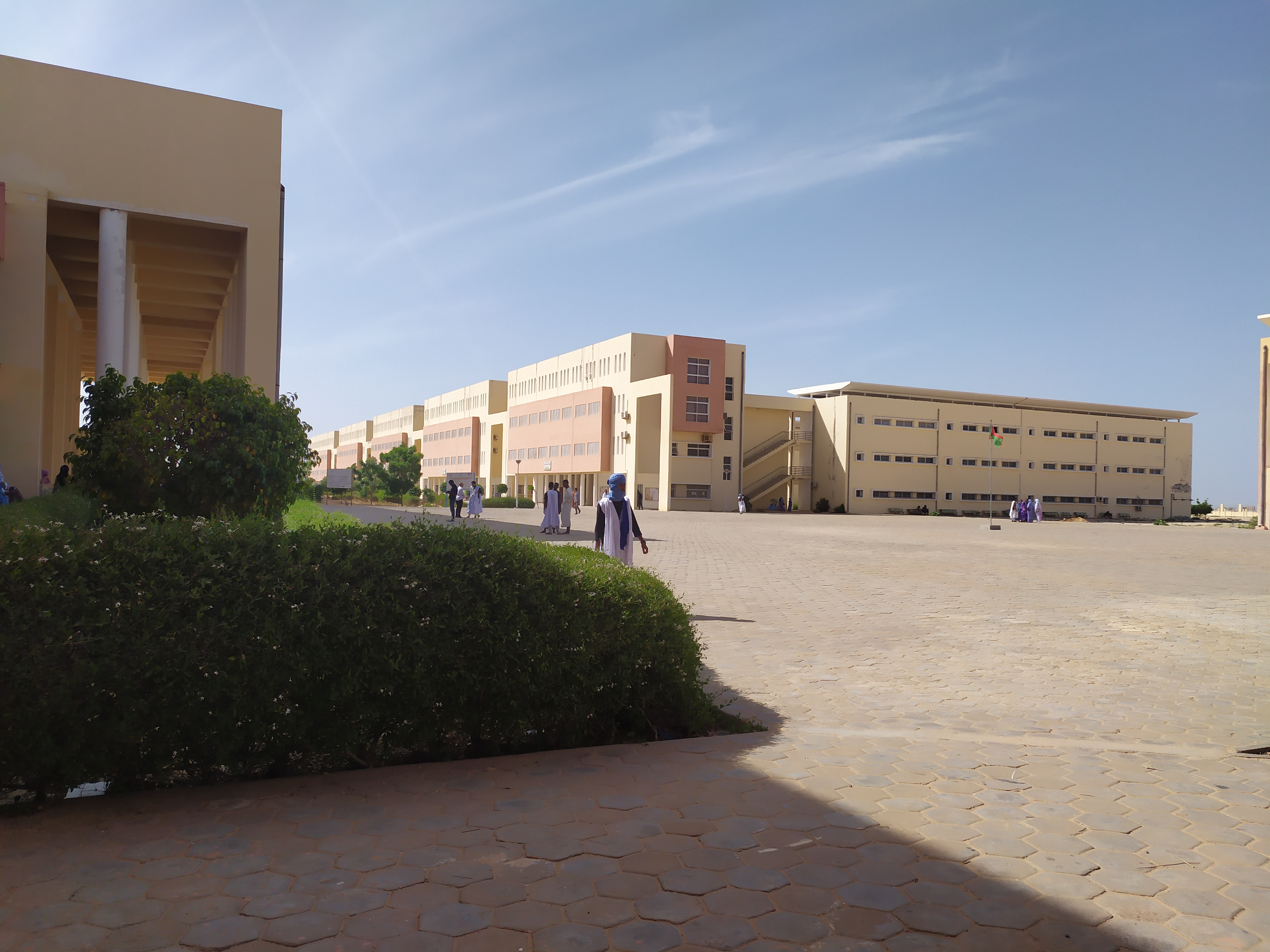
- Type: Public
- Established: July 2016; 10 years ago
- President: Dr. Cheikh Saad Bouh Kamara
- Students: 12,000
- Location: Nouakchott, Nouakchott, Mauritania
- Campus: 5
- Website: http://www.una.mr

The University of Nouakchott Al Aasriya (French: Université de Nouakchott Al Aasriya, Arabic: جامعة نواكشوط) is a university in the city of Nouakchott, capital of Mauritania.

== History ==
The university was created in July 2016 from the merger of the University of Science, Technology and Medicine and the University of Nouakchott, that was established in 1981 and has more than 12,000 students.

== Notable alumni ==
- Khadijetou Lekweiry - virologist

== See also ==
- List of Islamic educational institutions
