= Grand National Hospital of Mauritania =

Grand National Hospital of Mauritania Grand National Hospital of Mauritania
- Mauritania Ministry of Health

Geography
- Location: Avenue Gamal Abdel Nasser, opposite the Institut National de Recherches en Sante Publique and adjacent (east) to the Hôpital Sabah, near the Ministry of Energy headquarters, Nouakchott, Mauritania
- Coordinates: 18°5′15″N 15°59′17″W

Organisation
- Type: General

Links
- Lists: Hospitals in Mauritania

Grand National Hospital of Mauritania is the national hospital of Mauritania, situated in Nouakchott.

It is located on the Avenue Gamal Abdel Nasser, opposite the Institut National de Recherches en Sante Publique and adjacent (east) to the Hôpital Sabah, near the Ministry of Energy headquarters.
