= List of ecoregions in Mauritania =

The following is a list of ecoregions in Mauritania, according to the Worldwide Fund for Nature (WWF).

== Terrestrial ecoregions ==
=== Tropical and subtropical grasslands, savannas, and shrublands ===
- Sahelian Acacia savanna
- West Sudanian savanna

=== Flooded grasslands and savannas ===
- Saharan halophytics

=== Deserts and xeric shrublands ===
- Atlantic coastal desert
- North Saharan steppe and woodlands
- Sahara desert
- South Saharan steppe and woodlands
- West Saharan montane xeric woodlands

== Freshwater ecoregions ==
- Dry Sahel
- Senegal-Gambia Catchments
- Temporary Maghreb

== Marine ecoregions ==
- Sahelian Upwelling
