= Television of Mauritania =

Mauritanian national state public television broadcaster

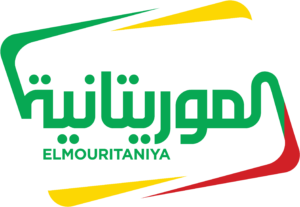
- Logo used since October 2022
- Type: Public establishment of an administrative nature
- Country: Mauritania
- Availability: National
- Motto: تجمعنا (English: It gathers us)
- TV stations: List: El Mouritaniya; El Mouritaniya 2; Arriadia; Athagavia; Al Barlemania
- Headquarters: Tevragh Zeina, Nouakchott, Mauritania
- Broadcast area: Mauritania
- Owner: Government of Mauritania
- Key people: Mohamed Mahmoud Ebou Elmeali (director general)
- Established: 1980 (as part of ORTM); 1990 (as an EPIC); 1991 (as an EPA)
- Launch date: 10 July 1984; 41 years ago
- Official website: www.tvm.mr
- Language: List: Arabic (Standard and Hassaniya); Wolof; Pulaar; Soninké; French

The Television of Mauritania (acronym TVM, Arabic: التلفزة الموريتانية, French: Télévision de Mauritanie) is Mauritania's national state-owned public service television broadcaster. Currently, the broadcaster is a member of the Arab States Broadcasting Union (ASBU).

== History ==
Television broadcasts started in Mauritania with a project supported by Iraqi funding in 1980 before being officially inaugurated in September 1982 as part of the Office of Radio Television of Mauritania (ORTM), with programs and bulletins being broadcast from ORTM's studios. Color television was introduced in 1984.

Television de Mauritania became autonomous from Radio Mauritanie on 10 July 1984, starting then to broadcast independently from its own studios. In 1990, TVM became a public establishment of an industrial and commercial nature (EPIC) in 1990, later changing to a public establishment of an administrative nature (EPA) in 1991.

TVM started broadcasting on Arabsat's satellites in October 1992 for four and a half hours a day, with it later expanding to 10 hours in June 1997 and 24 hours in late 2005. TVM first started broadcasting on Arabsat-2A, with it later using Badr-4 around 2004 in order to reach a wider audience in the Middle East and Africa, where it has been broadcasting since.

TVM was an associate member of the European Broadcasting Union from 2003 to 2013.

On 13 October 2007 TVM launched a second channel branded as TVM Plus, now known as El Mouritaniya 2.

In 2015 a project to create an educational TV channel broadcasting university lectures in cooperation with the University of Nouakchott was presented by the Minister of Higher Education, albeit it didn't finally launch.

On 26 October 2017, the Council of Ministers agreed on creating a sports and a cultural channel: Arriadia was launched on 28 November 2017 (Independence Day), while Athagavia was launched on 1 December 2017 during the Ancient Cities Festival held in Tichitt.

In April 2019, the religious TV channel El Mahadra was transferred from Radio Mauritanie to TVM, justified on the government's intention to include El Mahadra as part of TVM's package and to benefit it from "the technical expertise of national television". On 31 March 2023 the Mauritanian government announced it started to work on retransferring the TV channel to Radio Mauritanie after years of dispute between TVM and Radio Mauritanie, with it being effective on 12 April 2023.

On 3 May 2019 Al Barlemania (Parliament TV) was launched, being the first dedicated legislative broadcaster from the Maghreb. It is jointly managed with the National Assembly, broadcasting from its headquarters.

=== Corporate identity ===
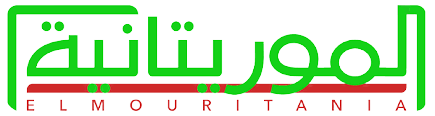
From September 2019 to February 2021.

From February 2021 to October 2022.

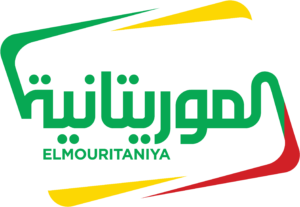
From October 2022 to present.

== Current television channels ==
- El Mouritaniya (Arabic: الموريتانية) is a generalist TV channel, broadcasting news and entertainment. It was launched on 10 July 1984. It has a high definition simulcast known as El Mouritaniya HD. It broadcasts in Arabic & French.
- El Mouritaniya 2 (Arabic: الموريتانية 2, previously known as TVM Plus) is a channel with slightly narrower programming with an emphasis on the minoritary national languages of Mauritania (Wolof, Pulaar and Soninké). It was launched on 13 October 2007 (Eid al-Fitr).
- Arriadia (Arabic: الرياضية) is a sports channel, mainly focused on broadcasting games from Mauritania's national football league Super D1. It was launched on 28 November 2017 (Independence Day).
- Athagavia (Arabic: الثقافية) is a cultural channel. It was launched on 1 December 2017 during the Ancient Cities Festival held in Tichitt.
- Al Barlemania (Arabic: البرلمانية) is the country's legislature broadcaster, jointly managed with the National Assembly. It was launched on 3 May 2019.

== See also ==
- Media of Mauritania
