= Radio Nationale (Mauritania) =

National radio of Mauritania

Coordinates: 18°5′8″N 15°58′9″W

Radio Nationale is the national radio of Mauritania. Its headquarters are in Nouakchott, Mauritania, located on the Avenue Gamal Abdel Nasser, opposite the Wilaya de Nouakchott headquarters and adjacent (west) to the Lycée de Garçons Nouakchott.

== See also ==
- Media of Mauritania
