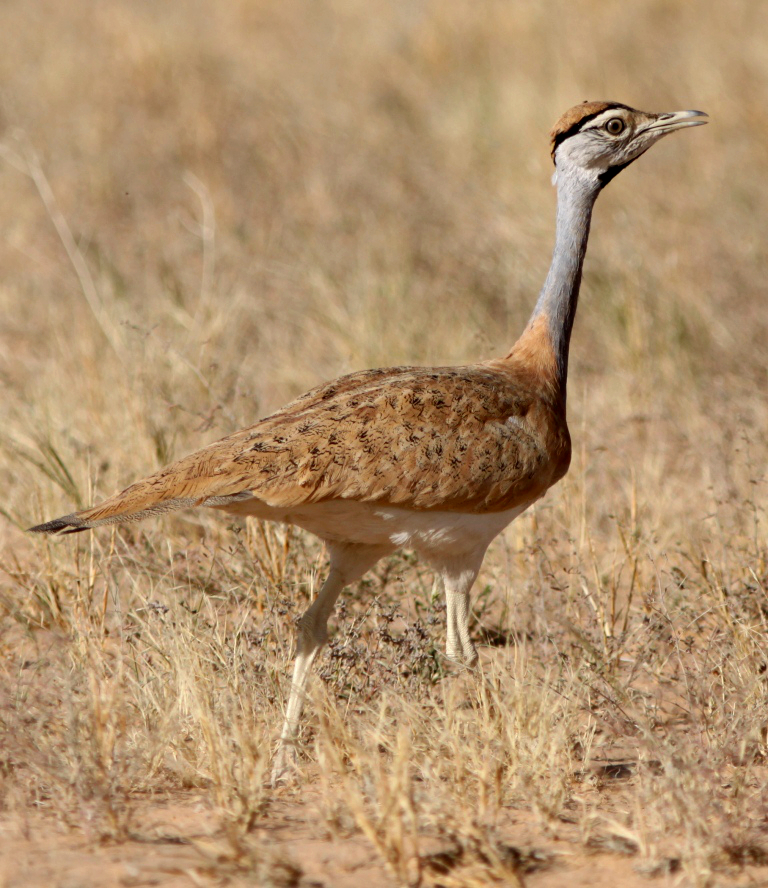
- Nubian bustard in Niger

Conservation status
- Vulnerable (IUCN 3.1)
- CITES Appendix II

Scientific classification
- Kingdom: Animalia
- Phylum: Chordata
- Class: Aves
- Order: Otidiformes
- Family: Otididae
- Genus: Neotis
- Species: N. nuba

Binomial name
- Neotis nuba (Cretzschmar, 1826)

= Nubian bustard =

Species of bird

The Nubian bustard (Neotis nuba) is a species of bird in the bustard family. This is a medium-large bustard, found in the sparsely vegetated interface between the southern margins of the Sahara desert and the northern part of the Sahel. It is found in Burkina Faso, Cameroon, Chad, Mali, Mauritania, Niger, Nigeria, and Sudan. Its natural habitats are dry savanna and subtropical or tropical dry shrubland. Formerly common in this region, it is now very rare, with populations declining due to hunting and habitat degradation.

== Description ==
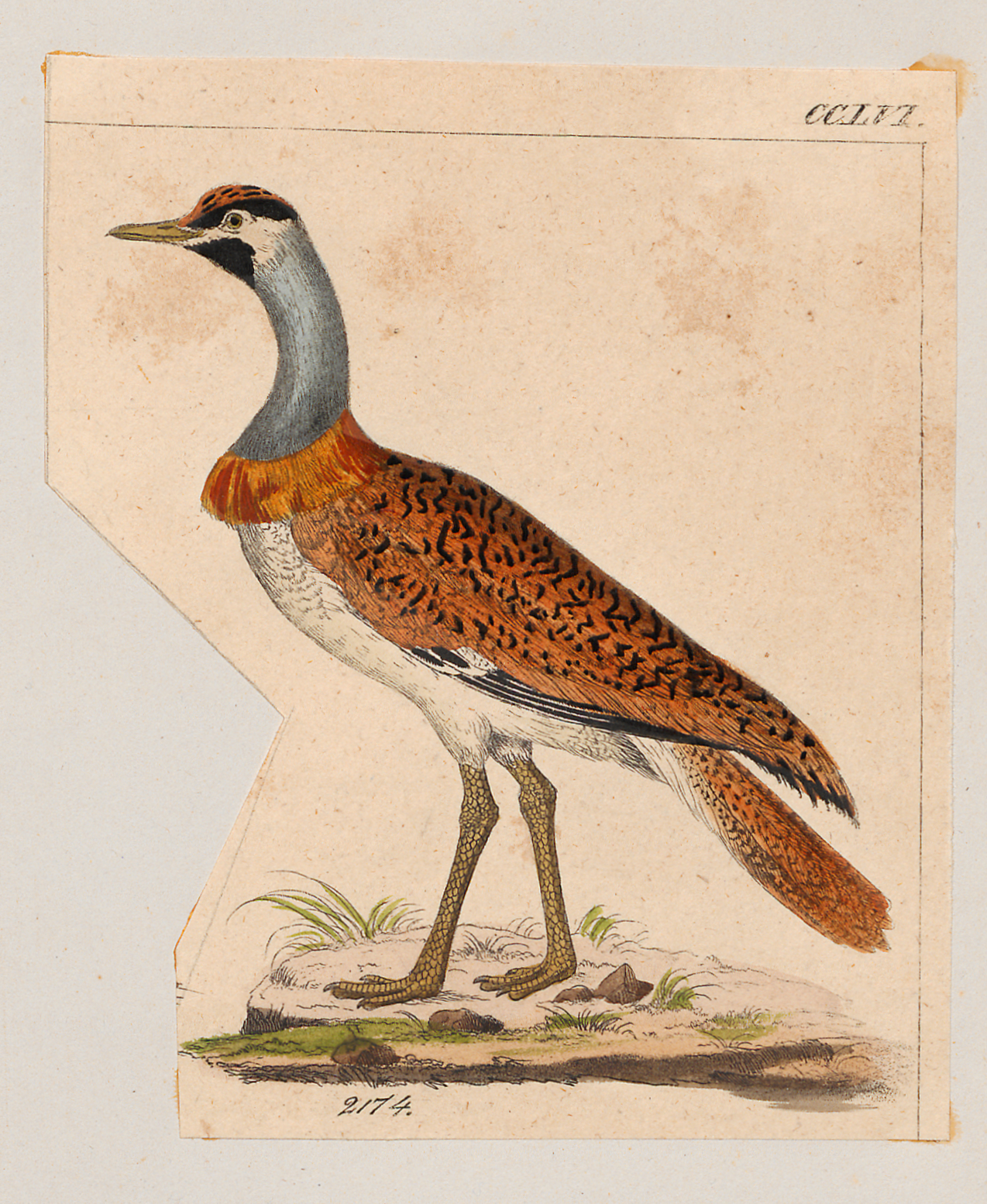
Illustration from Iconographia Zoologica.

The Nubian bustard is medium-large with pronounced sexual size dimorphism. In this species, males average around 5.4 kg (12 lb) weight and around 70 cm (28 in) length and 180 cm (71 in) wingspan. Females are much smaller at around 50 cm (20 in) in length and 140 cm (55 in) wingspan; their weight is not recorded. It is smaller than the sympatric Arabian bustard, as well as more rufous with a different body shape. Compared to larger bustards, the Nubian bustard has a more rounded body, a relatively long, thin neck, and a rounded head.

Mature birds have plumages of rufous and sandy tones, with a long, broad sandy-rufous stripe on the crown unique among bustards. Immature plumage in juveniles are paler and less contrasted than adults. Both sexes are similar in coloration. The tail structure is highly specialized, with the outer rectrices being longer, stiffer, and more sharply pointed than the central tail feathers. This adaptation enables the remarkable forked-tail display that distinguishes this species from all other bustards.

Specific information on molting cycles and sequences in the Nubian bustard has not been comprehensively documented. As with other bustards, the species likely undergoes a complete annual molt, though timing and duration remain poorly studied.

== Taxonomy ==
The species was originally described as Otis nuba by Philipp Jakob Cretzschmar in 1826 from specimens collected near Shendi, Sudan. Traditionally, it has been placed in the genus Neotis, along with several other African bustards (N. denhami, N. heuglinii, N. ludwigii). Molecular phylogenetic studies using cytochrome b, a well-known genetic marker, revealed that the relationships among bustard genera are complex, with N. nuba diverging early from other Neotis and Ardeotis species, suggesting significant evolutionary distinctiveness.

In 2023, researchers proposed a new monotypic genus, Nubotis, based on molecular, morphological, and behavioral evidence, including a unique forked tail structure and a distinctive male display. When posturing, males walk with their tail held in a vertical fork while the wing-tips rest between the fork, which contrasts the neck-inflation displays characteristic of other Neotis species and all Ardeotis species. While formally published, this genus has not yet been widely adopted in major taxonomic checklists, so Neotis nuba remains standard in most references.

N. nuba represents an early diverging lineage within African bustards. Molecular dating suggests the Otididae family originated in the Miocene, with rapid radiation producing the major genera.

=== Alternate names ===
The species is known by various vernacular names across different languages and regions. In French, it is called Outarde de Nubie or Outarde nubienne; in German, Nubientrappe or Nubiertrappe; in Spanish, Avutarda Núbica. The Arabic name varies regionally but often references its desert habitat.

=== Subspecies ===
- N. n. nuba – eastern nominate subspecies
- N. n. agaze (Vaurie, 1961) – western subspecies

== Distribution and habitat ==
The Nubian bustard occurs in a broad but disjunct range across the Sahel and southern Sahara, with the western subspecies (N. n. agaze) found in Mauritania, Mali, Burkina Faso, Niger, and western Chad, and the eastern subspecies (N. n. nuba) inhabiting eastern Chad and Sudan. Preferred habitats include desert fringes, semi-arid scrub, and dry savannah with scattered vegetation. Populations are patchy and the species is locally rare.

== Behavior and ecology ==
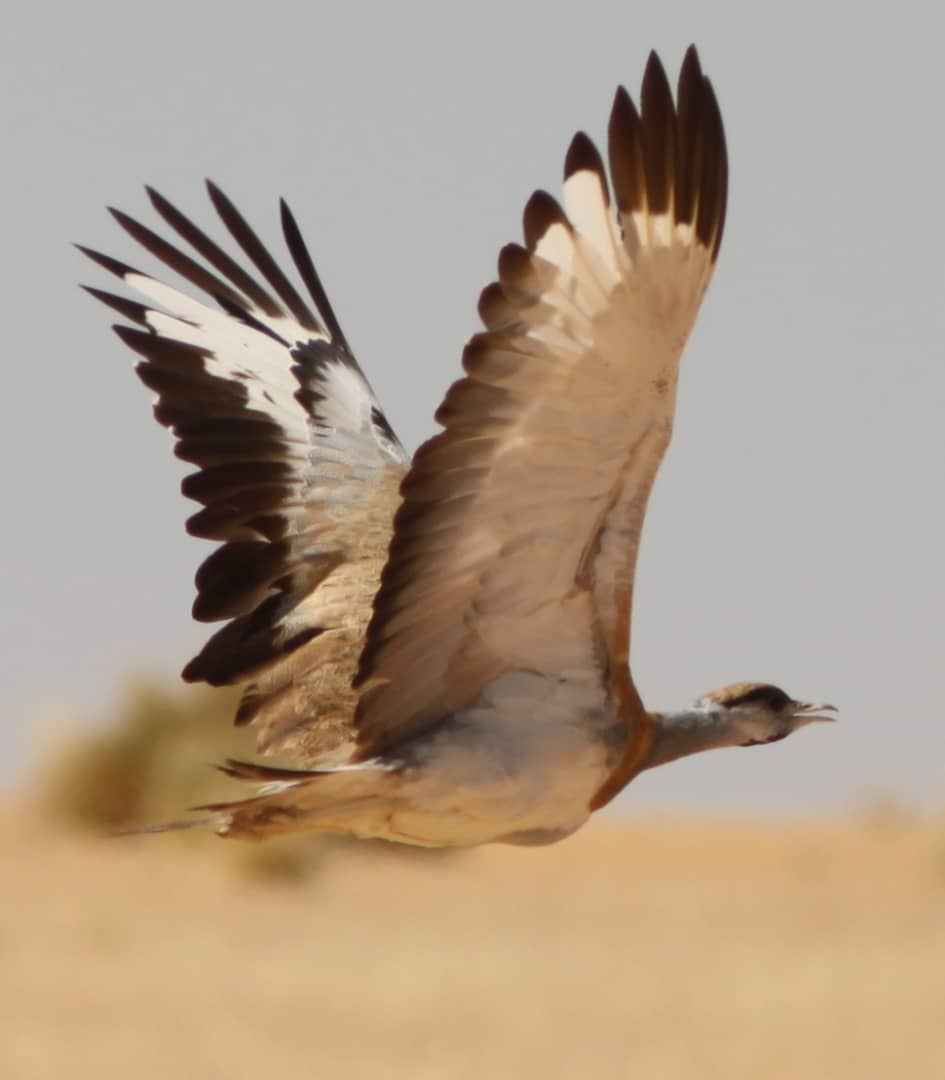
Nubian bustard in flight.

The Nubian bustard remains one of the least-known bustard species in terms of detailed behavioral ecology due to its remote habitat, low population density, and the extreme difficulty of conducting sustained field observations in its range.

=== Vocalizations ===
Audio recordings are extremely scarce in ornithological sound archives. The calls that have been recorded are reported to be relatively quiet compared to the loud vocalizations characteristic of some other bustard species. and consist of low booming or hooting.

=== Display behavior ===
The display behavior of the Nubian bustard remained entirely undocumented until 2022. Males perform a unique forked-tail display, walking with tail held vertically and wing-tips resting between the fork. This differs from neck-inflation displays typical of other bustards, as which involve no use of the tail. The Nubian bustard maintains a retracted neck during display. The display is performed solitarily with no nearby conspecifics, suggesting a dispersed territorial or mating system.

=== Diet ===
Nubian bustards are omnivorous with a diet consisting of large insects (beetles, grasshoppers), grass seeds, leaves and fruits. The relative proportions of animal versus plant matter in the diet likely vary seasonally depending on prey availability and phenological changes in vegetation. Like other bustards inhabiting arid environments, the Nubian bustard is presumably capable of obtaining much of its water requirements from food, reducing dependence on free water sources – an important adaptation in its drought-prone habitat.

Specific foraging behavior, prey selection, and dietary composition across seasons and geographic regions remain poorly studied.

=== Reproduction ===
Breeding occurs from July to October, coinciding with the region's rainy season. Nubian bustards create scape nests by scraping shallow depressions in the ground. There is limited observed information on clutch size, incubation periods and parental care. Young birds and eggs are threatened by a wider range of predators, including mammalian carnivores (jackals, foxes and possibly honey badgers) and reptiles (monitor lizards and possibly large snakes). Adult birds may face predation risk from large raptors, though specific predator-prey relationships have not been documented.

== Conservation ==
Currently classified as Vulnerable by the IUCN, its main threats are hunting (particularly by wealthy Arab falconers) and habitat loss through overgrazing. Reports have also documented Nubian bustard hunting by local nomadic groups, and military/mining personnel.

Civil conflicts in Chad during the 1980s and ongoing instability in Sudan have exacerbated hunting pressure due to proliferation of weapons in rural areas. Off-take has likely intensified in recent decades as vehicular access to formerly remote regions has increased.

The Sahelian zone is experiencing widespread habitat degradation driven by expanding human populations and livestock numbers. Overgrazing by domestic livestock degrades vegetation structure and reduces food availability for bustards.

Climate change is increasing aridity and unpredictability of rainfall, potentially reducing habitat quality further. Conversion of natural habitat for agriculture, though limited in the species' most arid habitat, is occurring at the southern margins of its range. Development of water resources and associated human settlement is fragmenting formerly continuous habitat.

It is now very rare, and remains little-known; major declines were reported between surveys in the early 1970s and 2004, and surveys across several hundred kilometres in Mauritania in 2012 failed to find any. An uprating of its status to at least Vulnerable may be needed. Some researchers have documented significant declines in populations and suspect local extinctions in Mali, Mauritania and Sudan, and argue that the species may now qualify as Vulnerable or Endangered under IUCN Red List Criteria. Niger and Chad continue to produce regular sightings, largely documented through the West African Bird DataBase (WABDaB).

However, important populations do exist in federally protected areas such as the Aïr and Ténéré National Nature Reserve (RNNAT) and the Termit and Tin-Toumma National Nature Reserve (RNNTT) in Niger, and the Ouadi Rimé-Ouadi Achim Faunal Reserve (RFOROA) in Chad. These reserves harbor the majority of remaining observations and likely support the largest extant populations.

However, even these protected areas face challenges including insufficient enforcement of hunting regulations, human encroachment, and inadequate resources for effective management. The expansion of powerlines and other infrastructure poses additional threats, as bustards are susceptible to collision mortality.

Conservation recommendations include minimizing hunting pressure through enhanced law enforcement and community engagement; preventing habitat degradation; excluding powerlines from core bustard habitat; and conducting systematic surveys to assess current population status and trends.

== Cultural significance ==
The Nubian bustard has limited cultural significance compared to some other bustard species, largely due to its occurrence in sparsely populated regions and its relative obscurity even among local communities. However, where the species persists, it is known to local nomadic peoples as a source of meat.

The species' extreme rarity and the remoteness of its habitat prevent any significant ecotourism value, though birdwatchers occasionally seek the species in Niger and Chad.

The species has gained unfortunate notoriety as a prized quarry for falconers from the Arabian Peninsula, contributing to hunting pressure. Traditional Arab falconry has historically targeted various bustard species, and the Nubian bustard's occurrence in accessible desert regions has made it vulnerable to organized hunting expeditions.
