= Telecommunications in Mauritania =

Telephones - main lines in use: 300,500 (2024)

Telephones - mobile cellular: 200,000 (2003)

Telephone system: general assessment: limited system of cable and open-wire lines, minor microwave radio relay links, and radiotelephone communications stations (improvements being made)

domestic: mostly cable and open-wire lines; a recently completed domestic satellite telecommunications system links Nouakchott with regional capitals.

international: country code +222; satellite earth stations - 9 Intelsat (Atlantic Ocean) and 20 Arabsat.

Radio broadcast stations: AM 1, FM 14, shortwave 1 (2001)

Radios: 410,000 (2001)

Television broadcast stations: 20 (2024)

Televisions: 708,000 (2001)

Internet Service Providers (ISPs): 26 (2014)

Internet users: 250,000 (2002)

Country code (Top level domain): .mr

== Broadband Internet access ==
Mauritania has three operators, the original monopoly, Mauritel (now owned by Vivendi's Maroc Telecom), Mattel (owned by Tunisie Telecom) and Chinguitel, which started operating in December 2006.

The country only has around 1000 DSL subscribers, and 300,0000 internet subscribers in total, out of a population of 4.5 million. Monthly DSL charges were high, around US$30 per month, but have now dropped to MRO 10,000 (around US$20) per month.

== See also ==
- Media of Mauritania
