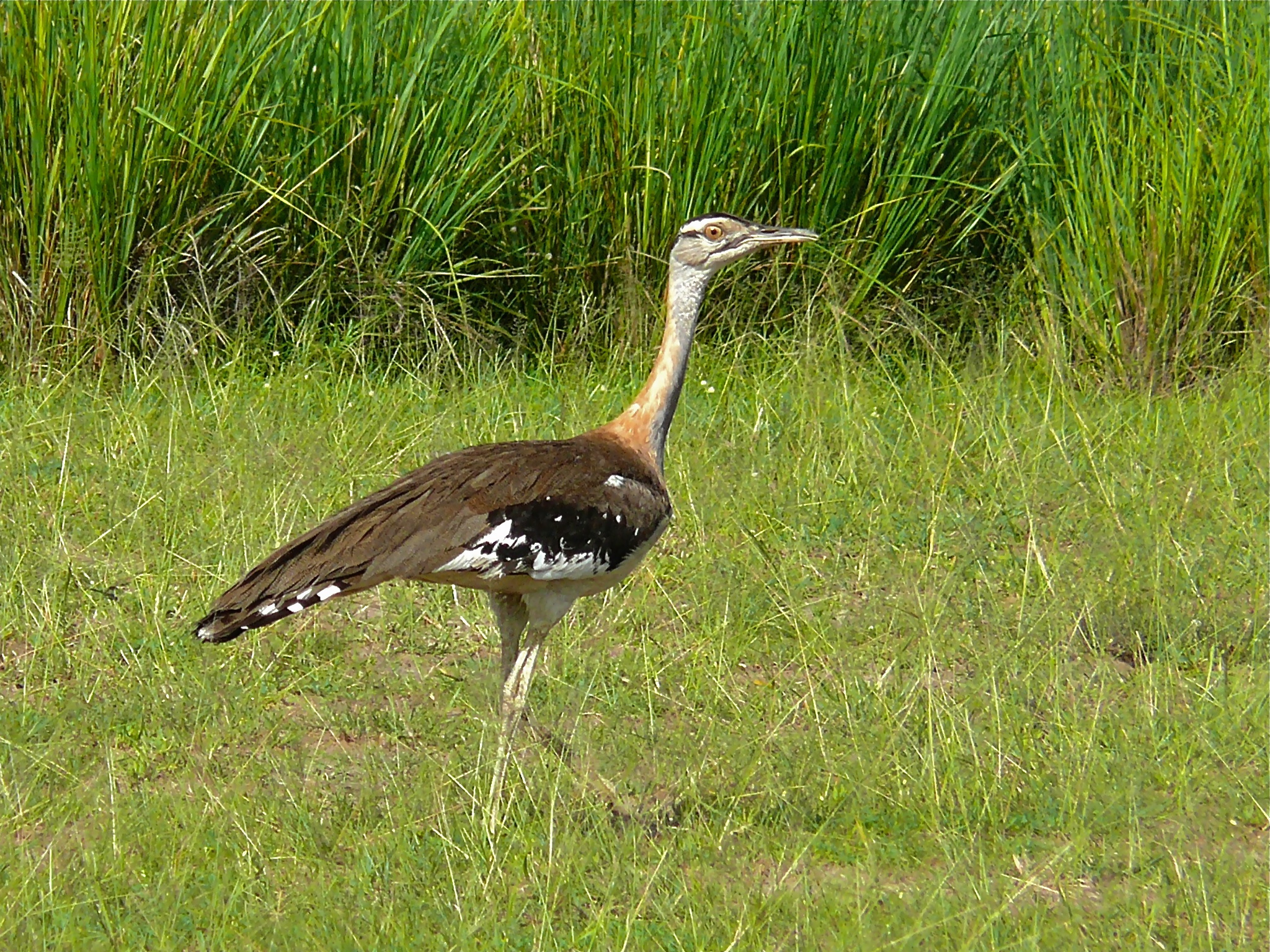

Conservation status
- Near Threatened (IUCN 3.1)
- CITES Appendix II

Scientific classification
- Kingdom: Animalia
- Phylum: Chordata
- Class: Aves
- Order: Otidiformes
- Family: Otididae
- Genus: Neotis
- Species: N. denhami

Binomial name
- Neotis denhami (Children & Vigors, 1826)
- Extant (resident) Extant (non-breeding)

Synonyms
- Neotis cafra denhami

= Denham's bustard =

Species of bird

Denham's bustard, Stanley bustard or Stanley's bustard (Neotis denhami) is a large bird in the bustard family. It breeds in much of Sub-Saharan Africa. It is a species of open ground, including agricultural land, grassland, flood-plains and burnt fynbos. It is resident, but some inland populations move to lower altitudes in winter. The common names for this species refer to the English explorer, Major Dixon Denham, and the English naturalist Edward Smith-Stanley, 13th Earl of Derby.

== Description ==
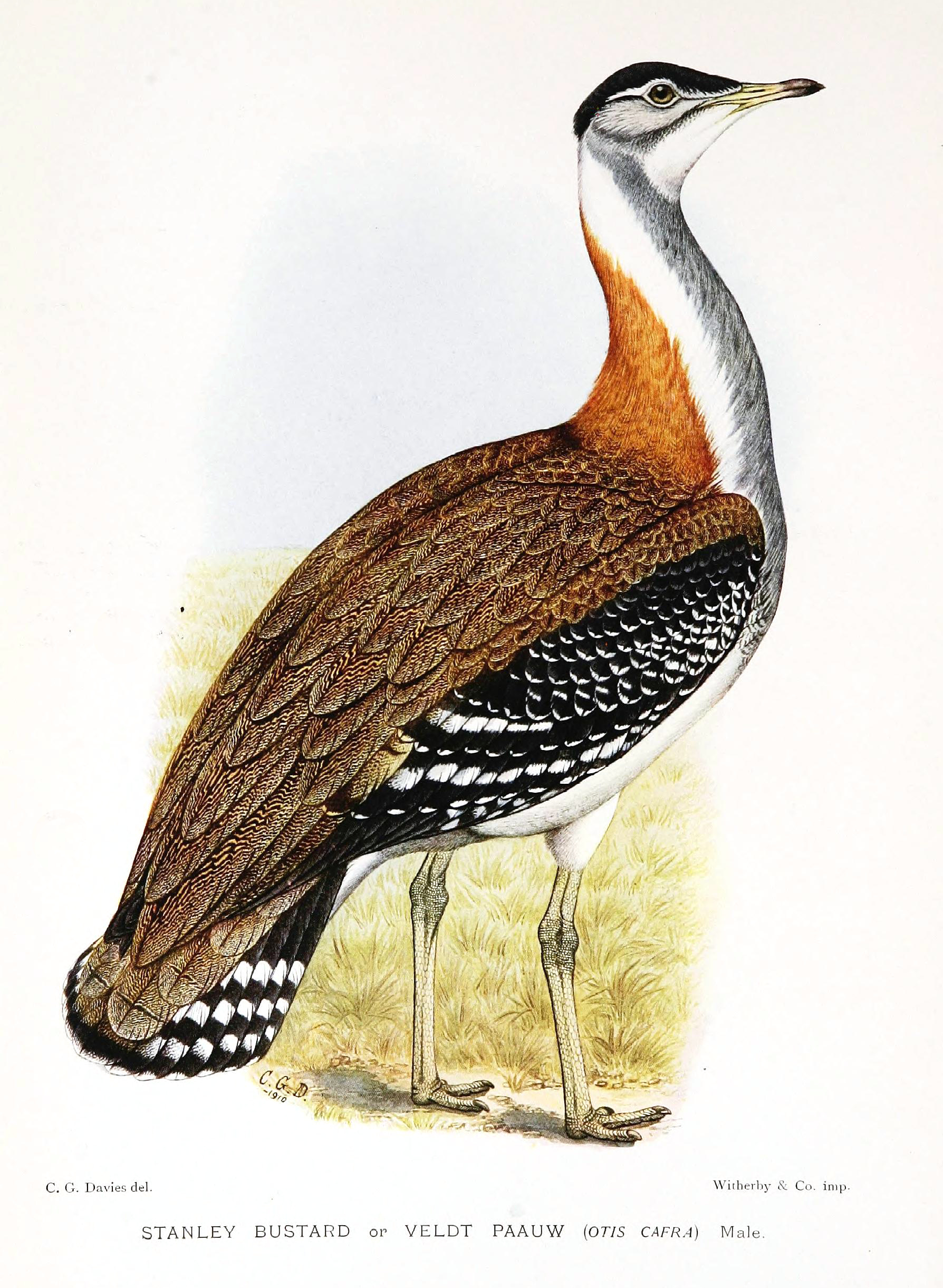

Denham's bustard is the largest species in the genus Neotis, although is smaller than the bustards in the genus Ardeotis (as well as the great bustard). The male is 9 to 10 kg (20 to 22 lb) and 100–116 cm (39–46 in), the female is much smaller at 3 to 4 kg (6.6 to 8.8 lb) and 80–87 cm (31–34 in). The back is brown, darker and plainer in the male, and the underparts are white. The neck is pale grey with an orange nape. Its grey crown is bordered with black, and a black line runs through the eye with a white line forming an eyebrow above. The long legs are pale yellow. The wings are strikingly patterned in brown, white and black, the male showing more white in flight than the female or young birds. The long legs are yellowish in color and the bill is whitish horn in color.

The male inflates his throat when displaying to show a conspicuous balloon of white feathers. This species is usually silent.

== Distribution and habitat ==
There are three subspecies of this bustard, all separated in their distribution. N. d. denhami occurs in southwestern Mauritania, Senegal and Gambia then eastwards to Uganda and Ethiopia. N. d. jacksoni is found in Kenya and Tanzania and south to Zambia, Botswana and Zimbabwe, with populations also in Angola, and the Democratic Republic of Congo. N. d. stanleyi occurs in South Africa and Eswatini. The Denham's bustard occupies grassland habitats. Mainly they are distributed in savanna and may be found at any elevation up to 3,000 m (9,800 ft). They can be found in a considerable range of secondary habitats including dense shrubland, light woodland, farmland, dried marsh and arid plains.

== Behavior ==
Denham's bustard are often solitary outside of the mating season, although they congregate at large food sources and temporarily band together for migratory movements. Migration is usually in search of food sources and follows passages of rain. This species is omnivorous, feeding on a wide variety of foods as it becomes available to them. Among the diverse foods recorded in the species are insects, small snakes, rodents, the nestlings of other birds and various green plant life. They will sometimes follow ungulate species in order to pick dung beetles out of their droppings.

Like all bustards, the male Denham's bustard performs a courtship display to attract the attention on females, on what is called a lek. During his display, the male puffs up his head and chest and flairs his tail, thus appearing larger, and calls loudly while he struts about. Breeding occurs over varied times of the year, being especially undefined in East Africa. Breeding may brought on by presence of rainfall. The nest consists of a shallow scrape, in which the female lays one or two eggs, which (if they survive) she will raise alone.

== Status ==
It has suffered population declines through much, if not all, of its range. Countries including South Africa, Kenya and Nigeria have had a sharp decrease in population. Hunting is the primary cause of declines across the Sahel and West Africa, but in eastern and southern Africa, conversion of grassland to agriculture is a greater threat. In some areas, the conversion of grassland into commercially logged forest has become a threat for the species.
