= Health in Mauritania =

== History ==
Mauritania's health care infrastructure in the early 1980s consisted of a central hospital in Nouakchott, twelve regional hospitals, a number of health clinics, maternal and child care centers, dispensaries, and mobile medical units to serve the countryside. All facilities suffered from a lack of equipment, supplies, and trained personnel. The ratio of people to hospital beds was 2,610 to one. The ratio of people to physicians was 13,350 to one. This ratio represented an improvement over the 1965 figure of 36,580 to one and was better than that of some of Mauritania's neighbors.

In 1987 Mauritania's largest medical facility was the 500-bed government-run hospital in Nouakchott. Staffed by Mauritanian and expatriate doctors, it lacked supplies and properly maintained equipment. Other facilities included the National Health Center, built in 1977 for the study of disease prevention and methods of public health care education, and the National School of Nurses and Midwives, founded in 1966 to train nurses, midwives, and paramedical personnel.

In general, health standards were quite low, and many infectious diseases were endemic. Contagious diseases (such as measles and tuberculosis) and respiratory disorders were more prevalent in northern arid regions, whereas malaria, guinea worm infection, and schistosomiasis were more common in the Senegal River Valley. The desert tended to be a healthier environment than the more tropical south, but several major diseases were common to all areas of the country. Typhoid, poliomyelitis, hepatitis, and a variety of parasitic illnesses also affected the population. In late 1987, the World Health Organization issued warnings about cholera, and outbreaks of both yellow fever and Rift Valley fever were reported in the extreme southern part of Trarza Region around Rosso. Contagious and infectious diseases were rampant in the kébés surrounding major towns, cities, and villages.

In the mid-1980s, a mass vaccination campaign for children under five years of age was under way. The program, aimed at reducing infection from poliomyelitis, diphtheria, pertussis, and several other diseases, was reportedly meeting with some success. Malnutrition remained widespread, especially in children. The long-term drought and the consequent drop in food production exacerbated this problem during the early 1980s. According to a 1987 report by the United States Agency for International Development, between 40 percent and 70 percent of children under the age of five had experienced moderate to severe malnutrition. The degree of malnutrition varied according to the success or failure of local crops, and some slight improvement was noted in early 1987.

=== Hospitals ===

In 2019, there were 645 medical facilities in Mauritania, including 18 general hospitals and several specialty hospitals. The other facilities were small health centers and posts.

Hospitals in
Name	Location	Coordinates	Ref
Atar Hospital	Adrar Region	20.4711806314°N 13.1434044113°W	
Chinguitty Hospital	Adrar Region	20.5822°N 12.3285°W	
Kiffa Hospital	Assaba Region	16.4996°N 11.3603°W	
Aleg Hospital	Brakna Region	17.0053°N 13.9616°W	
Nouadhibou Regional Hospital Centre	Dakhlet Nouadhibou Region	20.9681765554°N 17.026208544°W	
Kaédi Regional Hospital	Gorgol Region	16.1423°N 13.462°W	
Selibaby Hospital	Guidimaka Region	15.1135°N 12.2141°W	
Nema Hospital	Hodh ech Chargui Region	16.6079°N 7.2153°W	
Aioun Hospital	Hodh el Gharbi Region	16.6701°N 9.58501°W	
Akjoujt Hospital	Inchiri Region	19.7362301713°N 14.4744524018°W	
General Hospital	Nouakchott (Capitol)	18.105826082°N 15.8961139425°W	
General Hospital	Nouakchott (Capitol)	18.1348882239°N 15.8570382356°W	
General Hospital	Nouakchott (Capitol)	18.1722854193°N 15.944885953°W	
General Hospital	Nouakchott (Capitol)	18.1939385145°N 15.8972075031°W	
Al-Saddaaqah Hospital	Nouakchott	18.065856809331905°N 15.958049296347909°W	
Hospital Military Nouakchott	Nouakchott	18.110066951851127°N 15.953264535480468°W	
Ophthalmological Hospital Nouakchott	Nouakchott	18.10768583813108°N 15.962587793314318°W	
National Cardiology Center	Nouakchott	18.16293308825754°N 15.995814801280835°W	
National Hospital Center	Nouakchott	18.088784714475768°N 15.986802577386248°W	
National Oncology Center	Nouakchott	18.09241537125465°N 15.980236529652043°W	
National Orthopedic Center for Physical Rehabilitation	Nouakchott	18.087764853525698°N 15.974614619594593°W	
Neuropsychiatry Center Nouakchott	Nouakchott	18.08366495281111°N 15.998711585536169°W	
Tidjikja Hospital	Tagant Region	18.5087°N 11.4001°W	
Zoueirat Hospital	Tiris Zemmour Region	22.7749°N 12.2981°W	
Boutilimit Hospital	Trarza Region	17.5133061846°N 14.6673553639°W	
Rosso Hospital	Trarza Region	16.5459065694°N 15.8805235577°W	

== Maternal and child healthcare ==
The 2020 maternal mortality rate per 100,000 births for Mauritania is 766. This is compared with 712.2 in 2008 and 1295.4 in 1990. The under 5 mortality rate, per 1,000 births is 122 and the neonatal mortality as a percentage of under 5's mortality is 35. In Mauritania the number of midwives per 1,000 live births is 1 and the lifetime risk of death for pregnant women 1 in 41.

== Malaria ==
In 2015, together with a group of colleagues, Khadijetou Lekweiry reported that the species Aedes aegypti was seen for the first time in Mauritania. In 2019, she reported the first appearance of the Plasmodium vivax parasite in Atar, a town in the north.

== See also ==
- Leblouh (fattening of girls)
