= Mass media in Mauritania =

The mass media in Mauritania is undergoing a shift into a "freer journalistic environment", while becoming increasingly open to the private sector.

The laws governing the media are the most liberal in the Sub-Saharan Africa region. As of 2010, Reporters Without Borders ranked Mauritania 99 out of 178 in its worldwide index of press freedom. In 2024, it was ranked 33rd out of 180 countries. Salka mint Sneid was a Mauritanian radio presenter, who was twice President of the Women's Network of Journalists of Mauritania.

A setback for press freedom occurred in 2009, when Hanevy Ould Dehah, editor of the website Taqadoumy, was imprisoned for several months, with an arbitrarily extended prison sentence, on the grounds of offending morals. Journalists may be banned in Mauritania for publishing work that undermines Islam.

After the 2008 military coup, the new regime clamped down on some radio and television journalists, while other media enjoyed freedom of speech, notably "Le Calame" and "La Tribune". Poorly paid journalists often edit work on demand by politicians or business interests. Self-censoring and lack of sources for articles are other problems marring balanced reporting in Mauritania.

== Print ==
Print media are enjoying a period of freedom under the current government, and freedom of speech is, for the most part, flourishing. The most popular print publications in Mauritania today are sensationalist newspapers called "peshmergas".

- Akhbar Nouakchott, daily, in Arabic
- Le Calame (Al-Qalam), weekly, in Arabic and French OCLC 887897109
- Chaab, daily, in Arabic
- L'Eveil-Hebdo, weekly
- Horizons, daily, in French
- Journal Officiel, Government journal of record OCLC 45951100
- Al-Mourabit
- Nouakchott Info, daily, in French
- Le Quotidien de Nouakchott
- Rajoul Echaree.

== Television ==
Mauritania's TV stations are state-owned. In 2010, however, the government passed legislation to open broadcasting to the private sector. Mauritania's public television station also has six regional stations that offer local programming.

- Television de Mauritanie (TVM), in Arabic and French

News agencies:

- Mauritanian News Agency (AMI), public agency
- Maurinews, privately owned.

== Radio ==
Mauritania's radio stations are state-owned. In 2010, however, the government passed legislation to open broadcasting to the private sector.

- Radio Mauritanie, in Arabic and French
- Radio France Internationale
- BBC World Service, FM 106.9 in Nouakchott and 102.4 in Nouadhibou

Agence Indépendante d'information ALAKHBAR. Première agence d’information indépendante en Mauritanie. Elle publie en Arabe et en Français.

== Telecommunications ==
Mauritel, which was privatized in 2001, maintains a monopoly over fixed-line service.

Mobile phone service is mostly restricted to urban areas, where 70 out of 100 people have mobile phones. Moroccan-owned Maroc Telecom operates in Mauritania, as well as Burkina Faso, Gabon and Mali.

== See also ==
- Cinema of Mauritania
- Arab States Broadcasting Union
- Federation of Arab News Agencies (FANA)

== Bibliography ==
- "Mauritania: Directory: the Press". Africa South of the Sahara 2003. Regional Surveys of the World. Europa Publications. 2003. ISBN 9781857431315. ISSN 0065-3896. (Includes information about broadcast media)
- "Mauritania", Freedom of the Press, United States: Freedom House, 2016, OCLC 57509361
