= Ministry of Energy (Mauritania) =

Mauritanian government ministry

Coordinates: 18°5′3″N 15°59′30″W

The Ministry of Energy is the national Ministry of Energy of Mauritania, located in Nouakchott. It is located on the corner of Avenue Gamal Abdel Nasser and the Nouadhibou Highway, near the Grand National Hospital of Mauritania.
