= 2024 African Nations Championship squads =

The 2024 African Nations Championship, known as the 2024 CHAN for short, is the eighth edition of the African Nations Championship. Being the first edition to be hosted by three countries, the tournament is held in Kenya, Tanzania and Uganda from 2 August to 30 August 2025.

Each squad could contain a maximum of 28 players (Regulations Article 72), consisting only of players currently playing in their respective local leagues. Each national team had to submit its list of 28 players before the deadline of 22 July 2025, 11 days before the start of the tournament.

The age listed for each player is on 2 August 2025, the first day of the tournament. A flag is included for coaches who are of a different nationality than their national team.

== Group A ==
=== Kenya ===
Manager: (South Africa) Benni McCarthy

Swaleh Pamba was initially part of the squad before being dropped out due to a heart condition.

No.	Pos.	Player	Date of birth (age)	Caps	Goals	Club
1	GK	Farouk Shikalo	12 October 1996 (aged 28)	3	0	(Football Kenya Federation) KCB
18	GK	Sebastian Wekesa	24 May 2000 (aged 25)	0	0	(Football Kenya Federation) Kariobangi Sharks
23	GK	Bryne Odhiambo	11 January 1997 (aged 28)	14	0	(Football Kenya Federation) Bandari
2	DF	Siraj Mohammed	4 December 1998 (aged 26)	1	0	(Football Kenya Federation) Bandari
3	DF	Aboud Omar	9 September 1992 (aged 32)	55	0	(Football Kenya Federation) Kenya Police
4	DF	Mike Kibwage	1 October 1997 (aged 27)	10	0	(Football Kenya Federation) Tusker
5	DF	Alphonce Omija	9 October 2002 (aged 22)	6	0	(Football Kenya Federation) Gor Mahia
13	DF	Lewis Bandi	1 December 2002 (aged 22)	1	0	(Football Kenya Federation) Leopards
20	DF	Manzur Okwaro	23 March 2006 (aged 19)	1	0	(Football Kenya Federation) KCB
22	DF	Kevin Okumu	24 April 1998 (aged 27)	0	0	(Football Kenya Federation) KCB
24	DF	Daniel Sakari	25 January 1999 (aged 26)	20	0	(Football Kenya Federation) Kenya Police
25	DF	Sylvester Owino	6 May 2001 (aged 24)	9	0	(Football Kenya Federation) Gor Mahia
7	MF	Brian Michira	31 August 1994 (aged 30)	0	0	(Football Kenya Federation) Shabana
8	MF	Alpha Onyango	23 December 2000 (aged 24)	2	0	(Football Kenya Federation) Gor Mahia
10	MF	Austin Odhiambo	16 December 1999 (aged 25)	11	3	(Football Kenya Federation) Gor Mahia
12	MF	Chrispine Erambo	10 December 2004 (aged 20)	10	0	(Football Kenya Federation) Tusker
17	MF	Ben Stanley Omondi	24 April 2004 (aged 21)	2	0	(Football Kenya Federation) Gor Mahia
21	MF	Marvin Omondi	3 December 2000 (aged 24)	4	0	(Football Kenya Federation) Kenya Police
6	FW	Edward Omondi	1 January 2004 (aged 21)	0	0	(Football Kenya Federation) Kenya Police
9	FW	Austine Odongo	8 March 2007 (aged 18)	0	0	(Football Kenya Federation) Shabana
11	FW	Boniface Muchiri	26 August 1996 (aged 28)	10	0	(Football Kenya Federation) Ulinzi Stars
14	FW	Felix Oluoch	18 April 1999 (aged 26)	0	0	(Football Kenya Federation) Posta Rangers
15	FW	Ryan Ogam	21 December 2004 (aged 20)	0	0	(Football Kenya Federation) Tusker
16	FW	Masoud Juma	3 February 1996 (aged 29)	21	6	(Football Kenya Federation) Migori Youth
19	FW	David Sakwa	4 February 2004 (aged 21)	2	1	(Football Kenya Federation) Bandari

=== Morocco ===
The final squad list was officially announced by the manager on a press conference on 23 July 2025.

Manager: Tarik Sektioui

No.	Pos.	Player	Date of birth (age)	Caps	Goals	Club
1	GK	El Mehdi Al Harrar	30 November 2000 (aged 24)	0	0	(Royal Moroccan Football Federation) Raja CA
12	GK	Rachid Ghanimi	25 April 2001 (aged 24)	0	0	(Royal Moroccan Football Federation) FUS Rabat
22	GK	Omar Aqzdaou	16 March 2003 (aged 22)	0	0	(Royal Moroccan Football Federation) Wydad AC
2	DF	Fouad Zahouani	18 April 2006 (aged 19)	0	0	(Royal Moroccan Football Federation) US Touarga
4	DF	Marouane Louadni	1 January 1995 (aged 30)	0	0	(Royal Moroccan Football Federation) AS FAR
7	DF	Mohamed Boulacsoute	23 September 1998 (aged 26)	0	0	(Royal Moroccan Football Federation) Raja CA
13	DF	Bouchaib Arrassi	6 January 2000 (aged 25)	0	0	(Royal Moroccan Football Federation) Raja CA
15	DF	Abdelhak Assal	8 June 1998 (aged 27)	0	0	(Royal Moroccan Football Federation) RS Berkane
17	DF	Youssef Belammari	20 September 1998 (aged 26)	5	0	(Royal Moroccan Football Federation) Raja CA
20	DF	Mohamed Moufid	12 January 2000 (aged 25)	0	0	(Royal Moroccan Football Federation) Wydad AC
28	DF	Mehdi Mchakhchekh	23 February 2004 (aged 21)	0	0	(Royal Moroccan Football Federation) Raja CA
3	MF	Anas Bach	10 February 1998 (aged 27)	0	0	(Royal Moroccan Football Federation) AS FAR
5	MF	Ayoub Khairi	16 February 2000 (aged 25)	0	0	(Royal Moroccan Football Federation) RS Berkane
6	MF	Reda Hajji	26 August 2000 (aged 24)	0	0	(Royal Moroccan Football Federation) RS Berkane
8	MF	Khalid Ait Ouarkhane	22 April 2000 (aged 25)	0	0	(Royal Moroccan Football Federation) AS FAR
10	MF	Sabir Bougrine	10 July 1996 (aged 29)	0	0	(Royal Moroccan Football Federation) Raja CA
14	MF	Amine Souane	17 September 2001 (aged 23)	0	0	(Royal Moroccan Football Federation) FUS Rabat
24	MF	Mohamed Rabie Hrimat	7 August 1994 (aged 30)	0	0	(Royal Moroccan Football Federation) AS FAR
27	MF	Houssam Essadak	30 July 2005 (aged 20)	0	0	(Royal Moroccan Football Federation) US Touarga
9	FW	Oussama Lamlioui	2 January 1996 (aged 29)	0	0	(Royal Moroccan Football Federation) RS Berkane
11	FW	Youness El Kaabi	12 December 2000 (aged 24)	0	0	(Royal Moroccan Football Federation) RS Berkane
16	FW	Salaheddine Errahouli	12 October 2002 (aged 22)	0	0	(Royal Moroccan Football Federation) OC Safi
18	FW	Imad Riahi	27 July 2000 (aged 25)	0	0	(Royal Moroccan Football Federation) RS Berkane
19	FW	Ayoub Mouloua	30 September 2002 (aged 22)	0	0	(Royal Moroccan Football Federation) FUS Rabat
21	FW	Youssef Mehri	7 September 1999 (aged 25)	0	0	(Royal Moroccan Football Federation) RS Berkane
23	FW	Saifeddine Bouhra	5 March 2000 (aged 25)	0	0	(Royal Moroccan Football Federation) Wydad AC
25	FW	Anas El Mahraoui	29 March 2001 (aged 24)	0	0	(Royal Moroccan Football Federation) CODM
26	FW	Khalid Baba	13 January 2000 (aged 25)	0	0	(Royal Moroccan Football Federation) DHJ

=== Angola ===
Manager: (Portugal) Pedro Gonçalves

No.	Pos.	Player	Date of birth (age)	Caps	Goals	Club
1	GK	Agostinho Calunga	10 July 1998 (aged 27)	0	0	(Angolan Football Federation) Wiliete
12	GK	Rui Honésimo	1 May 1996 (aged 29)	0	0	(Angolan Football Federation) Interclube
22	GK	Neblú	16 December 1993 (aged 31)	43	0	(Angolan Football Federation) 1° de Agosto
2	DF	Antonio Hossi	12 June 2001 (aged 24)	27	0	(Angolan Football Federation) 1° de Agosto
5	DF	Kinito	13 March 1998 (aged 27)	21	0	(Angolan Football Federation) Petro de Luanda
6	DF	Lulas	17 March 1996 (aged 29)	3	0	(Angolan Football Federation) Sagrada Esperança
14	DF	Mabele	30 December 1999 (aged 25)	6	0	(Angolan Football Federation) 1° de Agosto
15	DF	Vidinho	25 February 1998 (aged 27)	11	4	(Angolan Football Federation) Petro de Luanda
16	DF	Luis Caica	31 July 2005 (aged 20)	1	0	(Angolan Football Federation) Interclube
18	DF	Lito Kapunge	4 April 1996 (aged 29)	1	0	(Angolan Football Federation) Kabuscorp
21	DF	Eddie Afonso	7 March 1994 (aged 31)	34	0	(Angolan Football Federation) Petro de Luanda
26	DF	Anderson Cruz	9 April 1996 (aged 29)	1	0	(Angolan Football Federation) Petro de Luanda
4	MF	Além	6 December 1997 (aged 27)	14	1	(Angolan Football Federation) Interclube
8	MF	Aguinaldo	17 October 1998 (aged 26)	1	0	(Angolan Football Federation) 1° de Agosto
9	MF	Mafuta	12 March 2000 (aged 25)	0	0	(Angolan Football Federation) Kabuscorp
17	MF	Vanilson	20 March 2000 (aged 25)	7	1	(Angolan Football Federation) Petro de Luanda
23	MF	Beni Jetour	19 April 2005 (aged 20)	0	0	(Angolan Football Federation) Wiliete
3	FW	Kaporal	16 May 1994 (aged 31)	9	2	(Angolan Football Federation) Wiliete
7	FW	Gilberto	10 March 2001 (aged 24)	21	3	(Angolan Football Federation) Petro de Luanda
11	FW	Lépua	23 December 1999 (aged 25)	11	1	(Angolan Football Federation) Sagrada Esperança
13	FW	Gogoró	6 June 1995 (aged 30)	0	0	(Angolan Football Federation) 1° de Agosto
19	FW	Jó Paciência	7 July 1996 (aged 29)	6	1	(Angolan Football Federation) Petro de Luanda
20	FW	Fernando	7 July 2005 (aged 20)	1	0	(Angolan Football Federation) 1° de Agosto

=== DR Congo ===
Manager: Otis N'goma

No.	Pos.	Player	Date of birth (age)	Caps	Goals	Club
1	GK	Jackson Lunanga	5 April 1997 (aged 28)	2	0	(Congolese Association Football Federation) Renaissance
16	GK	Brudel Efonge	28 May 1999 (aged 26)	1	0	(Congolese Association Football Federation) Maniema
21	GK	Aimé Bakula	14 February 1985 (aged 40)	0	0	(Congolese Association Football Federation) Don Bosco
2	DF	Dieu Bénit Ndongala	6 January 2003 (aged 22)	0	0	(Congolese Association Football Federation) TP Mazembe
4	DF	Jacques Mwimba Kapanga	6 June 2004 (aged 21)	0	0	(Congolese Association Football Federation) Maniema
12	DF	Magloire Ntambwe	5 May 1998 (aged 27)	0	0	(Congolese Association Football Federation) TP Mazembe
18	DF	Helton Kayembe	16 March 2001 (aged 24)	1	0	(Congolese Association Football Federation) Aigles du Congo
22	DF	Henoc Lolendo Masanga	22 December 2004 (aged 20)	0	0	(Congolese Association Football Federation) AS Vita Club
24	DF	Papy Kokeleya	17 January 2000 (aged 25)	0	0	(Congolese Association Football Federation) Saint-Éloi Lupopo
25	DF	Mokonzi Katumbwe	23 July 2000 (aged 25)	2	1	(Congolese Association Football Federation) Saint-Éloi Lupopo
27	DF	Osée Ndombele Lutaladio	17 July 1998 (aged 27)	0	0	(Congolese Association Football Federation) Maniema
3	MF	Lise Nyembo Ntumba	3 March 2004 (aged 21)	1	1	(Congolese Association Football Federation) Saint-Éloi Lupopo
5	MF	Kazema Baso	28 August 2000 (aged 24)	0	0	(Congolese Association Football Federation) Saint-Éloi Lupopo
7	MF	Basiala Amongo	29 December 1998 (aged 26)	0	0	(Congolese Association Football Federation) Maniema
8	MF	Miché Mika	11 September 1996 (aged 28)	20	0	(Congolese Association Football Federation) Saint-Éloi Lupopo
10	MF	Ibrahim Matobo Mubalu	5 December 2005 (aged 19)	2	0	(Congolese Association Football Federation) Aigles du Congo
11	MF	Boaz Ngalamulume	24 September 2000 (aged 24)	0	0	(Congolese Association Football Federation) TP Mazembe
13	MF	Mbiyeye Bisamuna	22 February 1998 (aged 27)	0	0	(Congolese Association Football Federation) Aigles du Congo
14	MF	Oscar Kabwit	5 May 2005 (aged 20)	3	2	(Congolese Association Football Federation) TP Mazembe
15	MF	Marzouk Diakana	3 March 2006 (aged 19)	0	0	(Congolese Association Football Federation) DCMP
20	MF	Jeancy Mboma Kinda	3 October 2000 (aged 24)	0	0	(Congolese Association Football Federation) Maniema
23	MF	Jean Benoît Tukumbane	29 August 2004 (aged 20)	0	0	(Congolese Association Football Federation) FC Tanganyika
26	MF	Linda Mtange	26 November 2002 (aged 22)	0	0	(Congolese Association Football Federation) Aigles du Congo
9	FW	Jephté Kitambala	3 May 1999 (aged 26)	2	0	(Congolese Association Football Federation) Maniema
17	FW	Tonny Talasi	23 December 2005 (aged 19)	2	0	(Congolese Association Football Federation) AF Anges Verts
19	FW	Malanga Horso Mwaku	12 November 2003 (aged 21)	1	0	(Congolese Association Football Federation) Saint-Éloi Lupopo

=== Zambia ===
Manager: (Israel) Avram Grant

No.	Pos.	Player	Date of birth (age)	Caps	Goals	Club
1	GK	Francis Mwansa	14 July 2002 (aged 23)	6	0	(Football Association of Zambia) Zanaco
16	GK	Willard Mwanza	3 June 1997 (aged 28)	0	0	(Football Association of Zambia) Power Dynamos
18	GK	Charles Kalumba	21 January 1996 (aged 29)	7	0	(Football Association of Zambia) Red Arrows
2	DF	Kebson Kamanga	16 June 1997 (aged 28)	6	0	(Football Association of Zambia) Red Arrows
3	DF	Benedict Chepeshi	10 June 1996 (aged 29)	45	0	(Football Association of Zambia) ZESCO United
4	DF	Happy Nsiku	1 March 2005 (aged 20)	0	0	(Football Association of Zambia) Red Arrows
5	DF	Killian Kanguluma	16 December 1999 (aged 25)	7	1	(Football Association of Zambia) Kabwe Warriors
14	DF	Kabaso Chongo	11 February 1992 (aged 33)	47	1	(Football Association of Zambia) ZESCO United
21	DF	Dominic Chanda	26 February 1996 (aged 29)	27	1	(Football Association of Zambia) Power Dynamos
23	DF	Mathews Banda	6 August 2005 (aged 19)	4	0	(Football Association of Zambia) Nkana
26	DF	John Chishimba	19 July 2002 (aged 23)	6	0	(Football Association of Zambia) Zanaco
6	MF	Owen Tembo	16 May 1995 (aged 30)	5	0	(Football Association of Zambia) Power Dynamos
8	MF	Larry Bwalya	29 May 1995 (aged 30)	17	1	(Football Association of Zambia) Napsa Stars
10	MF	Prince Mumba	24 March 2001 (aged 24)	11	1	(Football Association of Zambia) Power Dynamos
15	MF	Kelvin Kapumbu	6 April 1996 (aged 29)	33	0	(Football Association of Zambia) Konkola Blades
19	MF	Frederick Mulambia	10 July 2002 (aged 23)	12	2	(Football Association of Zambia) Power Dynamos
25	MF	Kenneth Kasanga	14 November 1996 (aged 28)	1	0	(Football Association of Zambia) Nkwazi
27	MF	Timothy Sichalwe	19 August 2004 (aged 20)	0	0	(Football Association of Zambia) Atletico Lusaka
9	FW	Andrew Phiri	21 May 2001 (aged 24)	10	0	(Football Association of Zambia) MUZA FC
11	FW	Charles Zulu	2 January 1996 (aged 29)	14	2	(Football Association of Zambia) Nkana
12	FW	Wilson Chisala	25 May 2002 (aged 23)	0	0	(Football Association of Zambia) Zanaco
13	FW	Jackson Kampamba	1 August 2003 (aged 22)	0	0	(Football Association of Zambia) Mutondo Stars
15	FW	Kelvin Kampamba	24 November 1996 (aged 28)	49	6	(Football Association of Zambia) ZESCO United
20	FW	Kelvin Mwanza	12 June 2003 (aged 22)	1	0	(Football Association of Zambia) MUZA FC
22	FW	Evans Kayombo	5 July 2000 (aged 25)	2	0	(Football Association of Zambia) Napsa Stars

== Group B ==
=== Tanzania ===
Head Coach : Hemed Morocco

No.	Pos.	Player	Date of birth (age)	Caps	Goals	Club
1	GK	Hussein Masalanga	4 March 1992 (aged 33)	1	0	(Tanzania Football Federation) Singida Black Stars
13	GK	Yakoub Suleiman Ali	7 December 1999 (aged 25)	3	0	(Tanzania Football Federation) JKT Mgambo
18	GK	Aishi Manula	13 September 1995 (aged 29)	64	0	(Tanzania Football Federation) Simba
2	DF	Abdulrazack Hamza	23 March 2003 (aged 22)	0	0	(Tanzania Football Federation) Simba
4	DF	Ibrahim Hamad	12 November 1997 (aged 27)	21	0	(Tanzania Football Federation) Young Africans
5	DF	Dickson Job (captain)	29 December 2000 (aged 24)	31	1	(Tanzania Football Federation) Young Africans
12	DF	Pascal Msindo	15 August 2003 (aged 21)	8	0	(Tanzania Football Federation) Azam
14	DF	Wilson Nangu	30 September 2001 (aged 23)	2	0	(Tanzania Football Federation) JKT Mgambo
15	DF	Mohammed Husseini	1 November 1996 (aged 28)	50	0	(Tanzania Football Federation) Young Africans
16	DF	Lusajo Mwaikenda	27 October 2000 (aged 24)	17	0	(Tanzania Football Federation) Azam
20	DF	Lameck Lawi	12 September 2005 (aged 19)	3	0	(Tanzania Football Federation) Coastal Union
22	DF	Shomari Kapombe	28 January 1992 (aged 33)	79	1	(Tanzania Football Federation) Simba
26	DF	Vedastus Masinde	16 June 2006 (aged 19)	1	0	(Tanzania Football Federation) TMA Stars
3	MF	Iddy Nado	3 November 1995 (aged 29)	16	1	(Tanzania Football Federation) Azam
6	MF	Feisal Salum	11 January 1998 (aged 27)	48	4	(Tanzania Football Federation) Azam
8	MF	Ahmed Pipino	27 February 2005 (aged 20)	3	0	(Tanzania Football Federation) KMC
10	MF	Shekhani Khamis	19 August 2002 (aged 22)	4	1	(Tanzania Football Federation) Young Africans
19	MF	Nassor Hamoud	23 March 2001 (aged 24)	4	0	(Tanzania Football Federation) Azam
21	MF	Yusuph Kagoma	3 April 1996 (aged 29)	2	0	(Tanzania Football Federation) Simba
23	MF	Mudathir Yahya	6 May 1996 (aged 29)	37	1	(Tanzania Football Federation) Young Africans
7	FW	Mishamo Daudi	24 December 2004 (aged 20)	3	0	(Tanzania Football Federation) Kengold
9	FW	Abdul Hamisi Suleiman	26 February 2001 (aged 24)	15	3	(Tanzania Football Federation) Azam
11	FW	Jammy Simba	15 July 2006 (aged 19)	0	0	(Tanzania Football Federation) KMC
17	FW	Ibrahim Ahmada	3 July 1995 (aged 30)	0	0	(Tanzania Football Federation) Tabora United
24	FW	Clement Mzize	7 January 2004 (aged 21)	10	0	(Tanzania Football Federation) Young Africans

=== Madagascar ===
Head Coach : Romuald Rakotondrabe

No.	Pos.	Player	Date of birth (age)	Caps	Goals	Club
1	GK	Michel Ramandimbisoa	11 February 1986 (aged 39)	3	0	(Malagasy Football Federation) ASSM Elgeco Plus
16	GK	Berni Tsilavintsoa	15 August 2001 (aged 23)	0	0	(Malagasy Football Federation) Fanalamanga
23	GK	Manda Hasina Ratsimbazafy	12 August 1994 (aged 30)	1	0	(Malagasy Football Federation) Ajesaia
2	DF	Nicolas Randriamanampisoa	9 September 1994 (aged 30)	8	0	(Malagasy Football Federation) Fosa Juniors
3	DF	Heriniaina Randrianirina	16 March 2000 (aged 25)	4	0	(Malagasy Football Federation) Fosa Juniors
4	DF	Tony	17 July 1994 (aged 31)	6	0	(Malagasy Football Federation) ASSM Elgeco Plus
5	DF	Hajatiana Ratsimbazafy	26 October 2003 (aged 21)	6	0	(Malagasy Football Federation) FC Disciples
18	DF	Patrick Tolojanahary	14 December 2002 (aged 22)	0	0	(Malagasy Football Federation) Ajesaia
19	DF	Bono Rabearivelo	15 July 2007 (aged 18)	1	0	(Malagasy Football Federation) FC Disciples
21	DF	Radoniaina Rabemanantsoa	17 December 1997 (aged 27)	16	0	(Malagasy Football Federation) Fanalamanga
22	DF	Fanomezantsoa Rakotonandrasana	13 May 1997 (aged 28)	1	0	(Malagasy Football Federation) COSFA
24	DF	Mandaniaina Rafelambolatiana		0	0	(Malagasy Football Federation) ASSM Elgeco Plus
27	DF	Tsilavina Ramahandrison	2 June 1996 (aged 29)	2	0	(Malagasy Football Federation) ASSM Elgeco Plus
28	DF	Pierre Randy Franco Randrianjatovo	23 August 2002 (aged 22)	0	0	(Malagasy Football Federation) USCA Foot
6	MF	Andy Rakotondrajoa	24 July 2003 (aged 22)	7	0	(Malagasy Football Federation) FC Disciples
8	MF	Lalaïna Rafanomezantsoa (captain)	10 March 2004 (aged 21)	26	3	(Malagasy Football Federation) CFFA
10	MF	Dax	21 April 1991 (aged 34)	37	2	(Malagasy Football Federation) Fosa Juniors
11	MF	Rayan Rajaonarivelo	5 February 2001 (aged 24)	6	0	(Malagasy Football Federation) FC Disciples
12	MF	Onjaniaina Patrick Hasinirina	30 March 1995 (aged 30)	8	0	(Malagasy Football Federation) ASSM Elgeco Plus
13	MF	Mika Razafimahatana	22 July 2004 (aged 21)	6	1	(Malagasy Football Federation) CFFA
14	MF	Onja Ramamonjisoa	9 May 1995 (aged 30)	0	0	(Malagasy Football Federation) Fanalamanga
15	MF	Harison Randrianantenaina	19 June 2003 (aged 22)	0	0	(Malagasy Football Federation) CFFA
25	MF	Mamisoa Alexandre Rakotoson	6 July 2002 (aged 23)	4	0	(Malagasy Football Federation) ASSM Elgeco Plus
26	MF	Fenotiana Randriamanjato	7 September	0	0	(Malagasy Football Federation) ASSM Elgeco Plus
7	FW	Félicité Manohatsoa	16 August 1999 (aged 25)	4	0	(Malagasy Football Federation) Fosa Juniors
9	FW	Fenohasina Razafimaro	27 January 1999 (aged 26)	8	1	(Malagasy Football Federation) Ajesaia
17	FW	Jean Luc Ranaivoson	24 April 1997 (aged 28)	1	0	(Malagasy Football Federation) Mama FCA
20	FW	Toky Rakotondraibe	9 January 2001 (aged 24)	8	1	(Malagasy Football Federation) COSFA

=== Mauritania ===
Head Coach : (Spain) Aritz López Garai

No.	Pos.	Player	Date of birth (age)	Caps	Goals	Club
1	GK	Abderrahmane Sarr	1 April 2005 (aged 20)	0	0	(Football Federation of the Islamic Republic of Mauritania) Nouakchott Kings
16	GK	Namori Diaw	30 December 1994 (aged 30)	24	0	(Football Federation of the Islamic Republic of Mauritania) FC Tevragh-Zeina
22	GK	Khalidou Ba	31 December 1996 (aged 28)	0	0	(Football Federation of the Islamic Republic of Mauritania) Chemal FC
2	DF	Mohamed Diop	7 July 1998 (aged 27)	0	0	(Football Federation of the Islamic Republic of Mauritania) Nouakchott Kings
3	DF	Mohamed Ramdane Zweide	25 March 2001 (aged 24)	2	0	(Football Federation of the Islamic Republic of Mauritania) FC Nouadhibou
4	DF	Abdellahi El Id	7 May 2001 (aged 24)	0	0	(Football Federation of the Islamic Republic of Mauritania) AS Douanes
5	DF	Demini Saleck	30 November 1994 (aged 30)	13	0	(Football Federation of the Islamic Republic of Mauritania) Nouadhibou
13	DF	Nouh Mohamed El Abd	24 December 2000 (aged 24)	23	1	(Football Federation of the Islamic Republic of Mauritania) Nouadhibou
14	DF	Soukrana Mheimid	19 June 1999 (aged 26)	10	0	(Football Federation of the Islamic Republic of Mauritania) Nouadhibou
15	DF	Oumar Mangane	31 December 1992 (aged 32)	9	0	(Football Federation of the Islamic Republic of Mauritania) Nouadhibou
6	MF	Mohamed El Abd Sidi Ahmed	5 May 2001 (aged 24)	7	0	(Football Federation of the Islamic Republic of Mauritania) Nouadhibou
12	MF	Alassane Diop	22 September 1997 (aged 27)	19	0	(Football Federation of the Islamic Republic of Mauritania) Nouakchott Kings
17	MF	Abdallahi Mahmoud	4 May 2000 (aged 25)	41	2	(Football Federation of the Islamic Republic of Mauritania) Nouadhibou
18	MF	Moctar El Hacen	31 December 1997 (aged 27)	51	7	(Football Federation of the Islamic Republic of Mauritania) Nouadhibou
20	MF	Mohamed Lemine Hawbott	6 January 2002 (aged 23)	5	0	(Football Federation of the Islamic Republic of Mauritania) Chemal FC
25	MF	Mohamed Saïd	25 February 2000 (aged 25)	0	0	(Football Federation of the Islamic Republic of Mauritania) Nouadhibou
7	FW	Mohamed El Kheir Faraji	26 January 2000 (aged 25)	0	0	(Football Federation of the Islamic Republic of Mauritania) Chemal FC
8	FW	Sidi Abdoullah Touda	10 November 1990 (aged 34)	7	2	(Football Federation of the Islamic Republic of Mauritania) Nouadhibou
9	FW	El Mami Tetah	12 November 2001 (aged 23)	3	1	(Football Federation of the Islamic Republic of Mauritania) AS Douanes
10	FW	Bessam Ahmed	5 December 1987 (aged 37)	60	11	(Football Federation of the Islamic Republic of Mauritania) Nouadhibou
11	FW	Moulaye Idriss	15 August 2001 (aged 23)	0	0	(Football Federation of the Islamic Republic of Mauritania) Nouakchott Kings
19	FW	Hamady N'Diaye	1 February 2000 (aged 25)	3	0	(Football Federation of the Islamic Republic of Mauritania) FC Tevragh-Zeina
21	FW	Ahmed Moctar	15 November 2003 (aged 21)	1	0	(Football Federation of the Islamic Republic of Mauritania) FC Tevragh-Zeina
23	FW	Mahmoud El Hacen	11 October 1997 (aged 27)	1	0	(Football Federation of the Islamic Republic of Mauritania) AS Pompier
24	FW	Cheikh Hattab	30 December 1997 (aged 27)	0	0	(Football Federation of the Islamic Republic of Mauritania) AS Pompier

=== Burkina Faso ===
Head Coach : Issa Balbone

No.	Pos.	Player	Date of birth (age)	Caps	Goals	Club
1	GK	Mathieu Convolbo	20 September 2000 (aged 24)	0	0	(Burkinabé Football Federation) Rahimo FC
16	GK	Moussa Traore	2 January 2001 (aged 24)	0	0	(Burkinabé Football Federation) ASFB
23	GK	Ladji Brahima Sanou	21 April 2003 (aged 22)	0	0	(Burkinabé Football Federation) As Sonabel
2	DF	Mohamed Guira	27 December 1999 (aged 25)	2	0	(Burkinabé Football Federation) As Sonabel
3	DF	Christophe Ouattara	1 December 2002 (aged 22)	0	0	(Burkinabé Football Federation) Rahimo FC
5	DF	Patrick Malo (captain)	18 February 1992 (aged 33)	23	0	(Burkinabé Football Federation) USFA
8	DF	Frank Tologo	13 September 1996 (aged 28)	0	0	(Burkinabé Football Federation) Vitesse FC
12	DF	Abdoul Abass Guiro	19 October 1994 (aged 30)	6	0	(Burkinabé Football Federation) ASFB
13	DF	Moumouni Diallo	25 February 2004 (aged 21)	0	0	(Burkinabé Football Federation) Sporting Cascades
21	DF	Hanaby Hadalou Sagne	20 December 2000 (aged 24)	2	0	(Burkinabé Football Federation) As Douanes
25	DF	Bassoma Henock Belem	14 November 2005 (aged 19)	0	0	(Burkinabé Football Federation) Majestic
4	MF	Josaphat Éléazar Ouattara	1 July 2003 (aged 22)	0	0	(Burkinabé Football Federation) Majestic
6	MF	Tertius Bagré	12 May 2003 (aged 22)	0	0	(Burkinabé Football Federation) Real Du Faso
14	MF	Kalifa Nikiema	31 December 2000 (aged 24)	1	0	(Burkinabé Football Federation) As Douanes
18	MF	Cédric Barro	20 January 2003 (aged 22)	0	0	(Burkinabé Football Federation) Rahimo FC
19	MF	Aliou Chitou Adjibadé	24 December 1996 (aged 28)	1	0	(Burkinabé Football Federation) Real Du Faso
22	MF	Abdoulaye Touré	24 April 1992 (aged 33)	2	0	(Burkinabé Football Federation) ASFA Yennenga
7	FW	Abdoul Karim Baguian	25 August 1995 (aged 29)	2	0	(Burkinabé Football Federation) USFA
9	FW	Papus Naser Ouattara	12 September 2006 (aged 18)	0	0	(Burkinabé Football Federation) Vitesse FC
10	FW	Damassi Konaté	30 June 1997 (aged 28)	0	0	(Burkinabé Football Federation) AS SONABEL
11	FW	Atiou Romain Lougoutiogué	2 September 2002 (aged 22)	1	0	(Burkinabé Football Federation) AS SONABEL
15	MF	Abdel Youssouf Kaboré	7 December 2005 (aged 19)	0	0	(Burkinabé Football Federation) Majestic
17	FW	Souleymane Sangaré	3 August 2003 (aged 21)	0	0	(Burkinabé Football Federation) Sporting Cascades
20	FW	Yves Koutiama	13 January 1999 (aged 26)	0	0	(Burkinabé Football Federation) USFA
24	FW	Ousmane Siry	30 May 1991 (aged 34)	1	0	(Burkinabé Football Federation) ASFB

=== Central African Republic ===
Head Coach : Sébastien Ngato

No.	Pos.	Player	Date of birth (age)	Caps	Goals	Club
1	GK	Eugène Ganazoui	2 October 2007 (aged 17)	0	0	(Central African Football Federation) AS Douanes
16	GK	Mauril Stéphane Abimala	7 January 2004 (aged 21)	0	0	(Central African Football Federation) Olympic Real de Bangui
22	GK	Saturnin Ngarsouma	10 December 1998 (aged 26)	2	0	(Central African Football Federation) Red Star de Bangui
2	DF	Cyril Kokpakpa-Boko	10 January 1998 (aged 27)	1	0	(Central African Football Federation) Olympic Real de Bangui
3	DF	Flory Yangao	13 January 2002 (aged 23)	29	0	(Central African Football Federation) Olympic Real de Bangui
4	DF	Cherubin Basse-Zokana	18 April 2004 (aged 21)	5	0	(Central African Football Federation) Red Star de Bangui
5	DF	Fourdeau Miambaye	9 November 1992 (aged 32)	0	0	(Central African Football Federation) Tempête Mocaf
6	DF	Michael Souango	19 November 1997 (aged 27)	2	0	(Central African Football Federation) Olympic Real de Bangui
12	DF	Héritier Namsona	25 October 2006 (aged 18)	0	0	(Central African Football Federation) DFC8
14	DF	Léonce Namgbema	23 April 2004 (aged 21)	5	0	(Central African Football Federation) Red Star de Bangui
24	DF	Ismaël Tongba	30 January 1990 (aged 35)	0	0	(Central African Football Federation) SCAF
26	DF	Donald Guesset	11 January 1996 (aged 29)	4	0	(Central African Football Federation) AS Douanes
8	MF	Melky Ndokomandji	4 September 1997 (aged 27)	9	1	(Central African Football Federation) Tempête Mocaf
13	MF	Judicaël Binguimalé	16 May 2004 (aged 21)	0	0	(Central African Football Federation) SCAF
15	MF	Nelson Ngaro	9 September 2005 (aged 19)	0	0	(Central African Football Federation) AS Douanes
18	MF	Ghislain Mounguidé	30 April 2002 (aged 23)	2	0	(Central African Football Federation) DFC8
19	MF	Angelo Galabazi	25 September 2003 (aged 21)	3	0	(Central African Football Federation) DFC8
23	MF	Sydney Tchibinda	21 August 1999 (aged 25)	1	0	(Central African Football Federation) Olympic Real de Bangui
7	FW	Juvénal Pouguy	4 January 2004 (aged 21)	0	0	(Central African Football Federation) Red Star de Bangui
9	FW	Ange Zoumara	27 January 1999 (aged 26)	1	0	(Central African Football Federation) Tempête Mocaf
10	FW	Yan Fayanga	10 July 1992 (aged 33)	2	0	(Central African Football Federation) Red Star de Bangui
11	FW	Landry Tsoungui	1 July 2005 (aged 20)	0	0	(Central African Football Federation) AS Douanes
17	FW	Dimitri Kogbeto	29 October 1992 (aged 32)	2	0	(Central African Football Federation) Olympic Real de Bangui
20	FW	Ronaldo Zé	17 July 2006 (aged 19)	0	0	(Central African Football Federation) AS Douanes
21	FW	Vianney Nguindipo	22 November 2001 (aged 23)	2	0	(Central African Football Federation) AS Douanes
25	FW	Bruny Bondade	25 April 2004 (aged 21)	0	0	(Central African Football Federation) Tempête Mocaf

== Group C ==
=== Uganda ===
The final squad list was officially announced by the manager on a press conference for the CHAN 2024 campaign.

Manager: Morley Byekwaso

No.	Pos.	Player	Date of birth (age)	Caps	Goals	Club
1	GK	Denis Kiggundu	15 May 2000 (aged 25)	0	0	(Federation of Uganda Football Associations) Vipers SC
18	GK	Joel Mutakubwa	17 July 1995 (aged 30)	7	0	(Federation of Uganda Football Associations) BUL FC
19	GK	Chrispas Kusiima	10 April 1993 (aged 32)	0	0	(Federation of Uganda Football Associations) Kitara FC
2	DF	Arnold Odong	2 March 1999 (aged 26)	0	0	(Federation of Uganda Football Associations) SC Villa
3	DF	Nicholas Mwere	13 March 2001 (aged 24)	1	0	(Federation of Uganda Football Associations) BUL FC
4	DF	Gideon Odongo	20 November 1999 (aged 25)	1	0	(Federation of Uganda Football Associations) NEC FC
5	DF	Herbert Achai	8 August 1999 (aged 25)	2	0	(Federation of Uganda Football Associations) KCCA FC
13	DF	Rogers Torach	23 June 2003 (aged 22)	3	0	(Federation of Uganda Football Associations) Vipers SC
16	DF	Hilary Mukundane	22 December 1997 (aged 27)	6	0	(Federation of Uganda Football Associations) Vipers SC
22	DF	Gavin Kizito	14 January 2002 (aged 23)	13	0	(Federation of Uganda Football Associations) KCCA FC
6	MF	Marvin Youngman	5 May 1998 (aged 27)	7	0	(Federation of Uganda Football Associations) Vipers SC
7	MF	Jude Ssemugabi	3 March 1997 (aged 28)	8	1	(Federation of Uganda Football Associations) Kitara FC
8	MF	Elvis Ngonde	10 January 2002 (aged 23)	1	0	(Federation of Uganda Football Associations) SC Villa
11	MF	Arafat Kiza Usama	27 June 2004 (aged 21)	5	0	(Federation of Uganda Football Associations) KCCA FC
14	MF	Reagan Mpande	7 May 2000 (aged 25)	0	0	(Federation of Uganda Football Associations) SC Villa
21	MF	Allan Okello (captain)	4 July 2000 (aged 25)	33	4	(Federation of Uganda Football Associations) Vipers SC
23	MF	Joel Sserunjogi	16 June 2002 (aged 23)	3	0	(Federation of Uganda Football Associations) KCCA FC
24	MF	Enock Ssebagala	28 July 2000 (aged 25)	1	0	(Federation of Uganda Football Associations) Vipers SC
25	MF	Karim Watambala	3 March 2000 (aged 25)	18	0	(Federation of Uganda Football Associations) Vipers SC
9	FW	Ivan Ahimbisibwe	23 November 1995 (aged 29)	2	0	(Federation of Uganda Football Associations) KCCA FC
10	FW	Patrick Kakande	25 April 2003 (aged 22)	5	0	(Federation of Uganda Football Associations) SC Villa
12	FW	Yunus Sentamu	13 August 1994 (aged 30)	27	4	(Federation of Uganda Football Associations) Vipers SC
15	FW	Lazaro Bwambale	25 October 2007 (aged 17)	0	0	(Federation of Uganda Football Associations) KCCA FC
17	FW	Emmanuel Anyama	14 July 1998 (aged 27)	0	0	(Federation of Uganda Football Associations) KCCA FC
20	FW	Shafik Nana Kwikiriza	3 March 2004 (aged 21)	2	0	(Federation of Uganda Football Associations) KCCA FC

=== Niger ===
Head Coach : Harouna Doula Gabde

No.	Pos.	Player	Date of birth (age)	Caps	Goals	Club
1	GK	Issiaka Boukari Kanta	2 July 1999 (aged 26)	0	0	(Nigerien Football Federation) ASN Nigelec
16	GK	Younoussa Abiboulaye	3 September 2004 (aged 20)	6	0	(Nigerien Football Federation) US GN
22	GK	Mahamadou Tanja	5 July 1996 (aged 29)	24	0	(Nigerien Football Federation) AS FAN
28	GK	Abdoul Kahar	7 September 1999 (aged 25)	0	0	(Nigerien Football Federation) AS Douanes
2	DF	Adamou Ibrahim Djibo	13 August 1998 (aged 26)	15	0	(Nigerien Football Federation) US GN
3	DF	Mohamed Moctar M'Baye	3 September 2004 (aged 20)	1	0	(Nigerien Football Federation) AS FAN
4	DF	Abdoul Jalil Mamane	17 April 1996 (aged 29)	1	0	(Nigerien Football Federation) AS Douanes
6	DF	Abdoul Kader Kassali	30 September 1998 (aged 26)	7	0	(Nigerien Football Federation) AS GNN
13	DF	Abraham Adamou	14 September 2002 (aged 22)	8	0	(Nigerien Football Federation) US GN
15	DF	Laouali Hachimou	21 October 1996 (aged 28)	0	0	(Nigerien Football Federation) ASN Nigelec
17	DF	Mohamed Abdouramane	11 March 2002 (aged 23)	7	0	(Nigerien Football Federation) AS Douanes
21	DF	Billal Oumarou	26 April 2006 (aged 19)	0	0	(Nigerien Football Federation) US GN
24	DF	Théodore Jules	8 November 1998 (aged 26)	3	1	(Nigerien Football Federation) AS GNN
25	DF	Abdoul Kader Harou	19 August 1999 (aged 25)	0	0	(Nigerien Football Federation) Urana FC
5	MF	Ridouane Assane	17 October 2001 (aged 23)	1	0	(Nigerien Football Federation) AS GNN
7	MF	Salifou Danja	31 January 2005 (aged 20)	4	0	(Nigerien Football Federation) US GN
8	MF	Moussa Kassa Moudou	11 November 1999 (aged 25)	9	0	(Nigerien Football Federation) US GN
10	MF	Harouna Nouridine	10 April 2003 (aged 22)	0	0	(Nigerien Football Federation) ASN Nigelec
12	MF	Hassane Harouna Moussa	1 January 2005 (aged 20)	4	0	(Nigerien Football Federation) AS FAN
14	MF	Abdourahamane Djibo	11 November 2005 (aged 19)	1	0	(Nigerien Football Federation) Sahel SC
18	MF	Ibrahim Djingarey	22 November 2006 (aged 18)	2	0	(Nigerien Football Federation) US GN
23	MF	Abdel Jelil Ahamat	9 September 2007 (aged 17)	1	0	(Nigerien Football Federation) US GN
26	MF	Ousseini Mani Balla	23 June 1994 (aged 31)	1	0	(Nigerien Football Federation) ASN Nigelec
9	FW	Chamsoudine Loukoumane	10 January 1998 (aged 27)	4	0	(Nigerien Football Federation) AS FAN
11	FW	Abdoul Razak Mounkaïla	11 December 2004 (aged 20)	1	0	(Nigerien Football Federation) AS FAN
19	FW	Yacouba Ali Nohou	1 January 1994 (aged 31)	1	0	(Nigerien Football Federation) Olympic Niamey
20	FW	Abdoul Latif Goumey	23 July 2005 (aged 20)	3	1	(Nigerien Football Federation) AS Douanes
27	FW	Ismael Issoufou	28 May 2004 (aged 21)	0	0	(Nigerien Football Federation) Sahel SC

=== Guinea ===
Head Coach : Souleymane Camara

No.	Pos.	Player	Date of birth (age)	Caps	Goals	Club
1	GK	Sekou Sylla	6 July 1993 (aged 32)	0	0	(Guinean Football Federation) Horoya AC
16	GK	Ousmane Camara	2 January 2000 (aged 25)	2	0	(Guinean Football Federation) Flamme Olympique
22	GK	Mory Keita	13 July 2005 (aged 20)	0	0	(Guinean Football Federation) Hafia FC
3	DF	Mohamed Bangoura	14 March 1996 (aged 29)	13	1	(Guinean Football Federation) ASM Sangarédi
4	DF	Mohamed Boké Camara	8 April 2004 (aged 21)	0	0	(Guinean Football Federation) CI Kamsar
5	DF	Bangaly Cissé	28 December 2002 (aged 22)	4	0	(Guinean Football Federation) ASM Sangarédi
13	DF	Mamady Mara	8 March 2008 (aged 17)	0	0	(Guinean Football Federation) Horoya AC
15	DF	Bourlaye Camara	13 February 2000 (aged 25)	1	0	(Guinean Football Federation) Milo FC
21	DF	Ibrahima Nounké Kaba	13 February 2003 (aged 22)	0	0	(Guinean Football Federation) Horoya AC
23	DF	Kabinet Kouyaté	27 August 2002 (aged 22)	2	1	(Guinean Football Federation) Hafia FC
2	MF	Mohamed Bangoura	2 October 2005 (aged 19)	2	0	(Guinean Football Federation) Hafia FC
6	MF	Ousmane Dramé	9 September 2000 (aged 24)	5	2	(Guinean Football Federation) Hafia FC
8	MF	Ibrahima Sory Sankhon	1 January 1996 (aged 29)	27	6	(Guinean Football Federation) AS Kaloum Star
10	MF	Alhassane Bangoura	12 December 2004 (aged 20)	3	0	(Guinean Football Federation) Milo FC
12	MF	Lansana Sylla	12 December 2005 (aged 19)	2	0	(Guinean Football Federation) Horoya AC
14	MF	Ismaël Camara	5 March 1998 (aged 27)	9	0	(Guinean Football Federation) Horoya AC
17	MF	Mahamed Madani Diarra	31 July 2000 (aged 25)	0	0	(Guinean Football Federation) Ashanti GB
20	MF	Mohamed Diabaté	3 March 2004 (aged 21)	0	0	(Guinean Football Federation) Hafia FC
7	FW	Bachir Bangoura	9 February 2006 (aged 19)	2	0	(Guinean Football Federation) Milo FC
9	FW	Yakhouba Barry	17 April 1998 (aged 27)	13	3	(Guinean Football Federation) Horoya AC
11	FW	Moussa Moise Camara	1 May 2002 (aged 23)	2	0	(Guinean Football Federation) Wakriya AC
18	FW	Cheick Bourhane Camara	15 February 2006 (aged 19)	0	0	(Guinean Football Federation) RCC de Kamsar
19	FW	Mohamed Lamine Youla	16 August 2008 (aged 16)	0	0	(Guinean Football Federation) Renaissance FC

=== Algeria ===
Head Coach: Madjid Bougherra

No.	Pos.	Player	Date of birth (age)	Caps	Goals	Club
1	GK	Tarek Bousseder	28 November 2000 (aged 24)	0	0	(Algerian Football Federation) ES Sétif
16	GK	Abderrahmane Medjadel	1 July 1998 (aged 27)	0	0	(Algerian Football Federation) ASO Chlef
23	GK	Zakaria Bouhalfaya	11 August 1997 (aged 27)	0	0	(Algerian Football Federation) CS Constantine
2	DF	Fares Nechat	25 May 2001 (aged 24)	0	0	(Algerian Football Federation) JS Kabylie
3	DF	Abderrahmane Bekkour	22 July 2003 (aged 22)	0	0	(Algerian Football Federation) CR Belouizdad
4	DF	Adem Alilet	17 January 1999 (aged 26)	0	0	(Algerian Football Federation) USM Alger
12	DF	Réda Halaïmia	28 August 1996 (aged 28)	8	0	(Algerian Football Federation) MC Alger
13	DF	Bilal Boukerchaoui	15 February 2003 (aged 22)	2	0	(Algerian Football Federation) CR Belouizdad
15	DF	Saâdi Radouani	18 March 1995 (aged 30)	3	0	(Algerian Football Federation) USM Alger
19	DF	Ayoub Ghezala	6 December 1995 (aged 29)	6	0	(Algerian Football Federation) MC Alger
20	DF	Ilyes Chetti	22 January 1995 (aged 30)	10	0	(Algerian Football Federation) USM Alger
24	DF	Naoufel Khacef	27 October 1997 (aged 27)	5	0	(Algerian Football Federation) CR Belouizdad
28	DF	Achref Abada	15 June 1999 (aged 26)	0	0	(Algerian Football Federation) ASO Chlef
5	MF	Messala Merbah	22 July 1994 (aged 31)	2	0	(Algerian Football Federation) CS Constantine
8	MF	Zakaria Draoui	20 February 1994 (aged 31)	13	0	(Algerian Football Federation) USM Alger
17	MF	Akram Bouras	23 February 2002 (aged 23)	2	0	(Algerian Football Federation) MC Alger
21	MF	Mehdi Merghem	19 July 1997 (aged 28)	0	0	(Algerian Football Federation) USM Alger
26	MF	Mehdi Boudjemaa	7 April 1998 (aged 27)	0	0	(Algerian Football Federation) JS Kabylie
6	FW	Tayeb Meziani	27 February 1996 (aged 29)	8	1	(Algerian Football Federation) MC Alger
7	FW	Abdennour Belhocini	18 August 1996 (aged 28)	2	0	(Algerian Football Federation) CR Belouizdad
9	FW	Soufiane Bayazid	16 November 1996 (aged 28)	4	1	(Algerian Football Federation) MC Alger
10	FW	Ben Ahmed Kohili	11 July 2005 (aged 20)	0	0	(Algerian Football Federation) Paradou AC
11	FW	Abderrahmane Meziane	7 March 1994 (aged 31)	9	1	(Algerian Football Federation) CR Belouizdad
18	FW	Aimen Mahious	15 September 1997 (aged 27)	11	5	(Algerian Football Federation) JS Kabylie
22	FW	Lahlou Akhrib	24 April 2005 (aged 20)	1	0	(Algerian Football Federation) JS Kabylie
27	FW	Diaa Eddine Mechid	1 January 2006 (aged 19)	0	0	(Algerian Football Federation) USM Alger

=== South Africa ===
Head Coach: Molefi Ntseki

No.	Pos.	Player	Date of birth (age)	Caps	Goals	Club
1	GK	Samukelo Xulu	2 February 2001 (aged 24)	1	0	(South African Football Association) Siwelele
16	GK	Kopano Thuntsane	30 October 1999 (aged 25)	0	0	(South African Football Association) Leicesterford City
22	GK	Andile Mbanjwa	30 March 1998 (aged 27)	1	0	(South African Football Association) AmaZulu
2	DF	Ramahlwe Mphahlele	1 February 1990 (aged 35)	17	0	(South African Football Association) AmaZulu
3	DF	Kegan Johannes	31 March 2001 (aged 24)	5	0	(South African Football Association) Mamelodi Sundowns
4	DF	Kwandakwensizwa Mngonyama	25 September 1993 (aged 31)	13	0	(South African Football Association) AmaZulu
5	DF	Ntando Nkosi	30 April 2004 (aged 21)	0	0	(South African Football Association) Mamelodi Sundowns
6	DF	Wayde Jooste	27 September 1991 (aged 33)	2	0	(South African Football Association) AmaZulu
12	DF	Thabang Molaoa	15 March 2000 (aged 25)	0	0	(South African Football Association) Chippa United
13	DF	Malibonge Khoza	16 March 2004 (aged 21)	0	0	(South African Football Association) Mamelodi Sundowns
18	DF	Harold Majadibodu	13 February 1995 (aged 30)	0	0	(South African Football Association) University of Pretoria
25	DF	Siyanda Msani	12 August 2001 (aged 23)	8	0	(South African Football Association) Mamelodi Sundowns
7	MF	Thabiso Kutumela	3 July 1993 (aged 32)	9	2	(South African Football Association) Richards Bay
8	MF	Ndabayithethwa Ndlondlo	28 May 1995 (aged 30)	0	0	(South African Football Association) Orlando Pirates
9	MF	Siyabonga Mashinini	23 January 2003 (aged 22)	0	0	(South African Football Association) Gomora
10	MF	Neo Maema (captain)	1 December 1995 (aged 29)	3	2	(South African Football Association) Mamelodi Sundowns
11	MF	Tebogo Tlolane	21 December 1994 (aged 30)	4	0	(South African Football Association) Golden Arrows
14	MF	Terrence Mashego	28 June 1996 (aged 29)	10	0	(South African Football Association) Mamelodi Sundowns
15	MF	Menzi Masuku	15 April 1993 (aged 32)	4	2	(South African Football Association) Golden Arrows
19	MF	Momelezi Dlambewu	1 January 2004 (aged 21)	0	0	(South African Football Association) Gomora
20	MF	Keagan Dolly	22 January 1993 (aged 32)	23	3	(South African Football Association) TS Galaxy
21	MF	Fortune Makaringe	13 May 1993 (aged 32)	3	0	(South African Football Association) Cape Town City
23	MF	Thamsaqa Masiya	17 September 1996 (aged 28)	0	0	(South African Football Association) TS Galaxy
24	MF	Luvuyo Phewa	8 November 1999 (aged 25)	1	1	(South African Football Association) Durban City
17	FW	Zakhele Lepasa	19 March 1997 (aged 28)	18	3	(South African Football Association) Orlando Pirates

== Group D ==
=== Senegal ===
Manager: Souleymane Diallo

No.	Pos.	Player	Date of birth (age)	Caps	Goals	Club
1	GK	Samba Mballo	18 January 2003 (aged 22)	0	0	(Senegalese Football Federation) US Gorée
16	GK	Marc Diouf	20 November 1998 (aged 26)	2	0	(Senegalese Football Federation) Teungueth
23	GK	Cheikh Ndoye	21 September 1992 (aged 32)	1	0	(Senegalese Football Federation) ASC Jaraaf
2	DF	Seyni Mbaye Ndiaye	5 January 2005 (aged 20)	0	0	(Senegalese Football Federation) US Gorée
3	DF	Mbaye Ndiaye	21 March 2003 (aged 22)	0	0	(Senegalese Football Federation) ASC Jaraaf
12	DF	Amadou Bene Coly	15 September 2002 (aged 22)	0	0	(Senegalese Football Federation) AJEL de Rufisque
13	DF	Layousse Samb	25 October 2000 (aged 24)	2	0	(Senegalese Football Federation) Teungueth
14	DF	Malick Sembène	3 November 2001 (aged 23)	0	0	(Senegalese Football Federation) AS Dakar Sacré-Cœur
15	DF	Baye Assane Ciss	10 October 2003 (aged 21)	2	1	(Senegalese Football Federation) Teungueth
22	DF	Daouda Ba	13 May 2005 (aged 20)	1	0	(Senegalese Football Federation) AS Dakar Sacré-Cœur
4	MF	Ousseynou Fall Seck	22 June 2007 (aged 18)	0	0	(Senegalese Football Federation) AJEL de Rufisque
6	MF	Moussa Cissé	20 April 2009 (aged 16)	0	0	(Senegalese Football Federation) Génération Foot
8	MF	Bonaventure Fonseca	10 January 2001 (aged 24)	0	0	(Senegalese Football Federation) US Ouakam
10	MF	Moctar Koïta	1 February 1996 (aged 29)	7	0	(Senegalese Football Federation) ASC Jaraaf
17	MF	Mbaye Yaya Ly	15 August 2002 (aged 22)	0	0	(Senegalese Football Federation) AS Pikine
19	MF	Insa Boye	23 March 2002 (aged 23)	0	0	(Senegalese Football Federation) Diambars
20	MF	Issa Kane	20 March 2003 (aged 22)	2	0	(Senegalese Football Federation) Casa Sports
24	MF	Pape Abasse Badji	27 December 2003 (aged 21)	0	0	(Senegalese Football Federation) Génération Foot
5	FW	Mapathé Mbodji	4 March 2000 (aged 25)	0	0	(Senegalese Football Federation) AS Caffeine
7	FW	Libasse Guèye	5 July 2003 (aged 22)	0	0	(Senegalese Football Federation) Teungueth
9	FW	Christian Gomis	29 October 2003 (aged 21)	0	0	(Senegalese Football Federation) Essamaye FC
11	FW	Oumar Ba	24 August 2003 (aged 21)	2	1	(Senegalese Football Federation) US Gorée
18	FW	Ababacar Sarr	14 March 2002 (aged 23)	2	0	(Senegalese Football Federation) ASC Jaraaf
21	FW	Ameth Niang	10 December 2006 (aged 18)	0	0	(Senegalese Football Federation) ASC Jaraaf
25	FW	Vieux Cissé	23 April 2004 (aged 21)	0	0	(Senegalese Football Federation) US Gorée

=== Congo ===
Manager: Barthélémy Ngatsono

No.	Pos.	Player	Date of birth (age)	Caps	Goals	Club
1	GK	Dhody Foutou	10 December 2003 (aged 21)	0	0	(Congolese Football Federation) Diables Noirs
16	GK	Chelcy Bonazebi	18 May 2006 (aged 19)	0	0	(Congolese Football Federation) CARA Brazzaville
23	GK	Ulrich Samba	1 July 2001 (aged 24)	0	0	(Congolese Football Federation) AS Otohô
2	DF	Beranger Itoua	9 May 1992 (aged 33)	15	0	(Congolese Football Federation) AS Otohô
3	DF	Prince Mouandza	23 October 2001 (aged 23)	8	1	(Congolese Football Federation) AS Otohô
4	DF	Vicalor Odzalambaye	aged 22	0	0	(Congolese Football Federation) Vita Club Mokanda
5	DF	Pedro Peya	19 January 2002 (aged 23)	0	0	(Congolese Football Federation) Étoile du Congo
14	DF	Van Igor Boukaka	26 June 2006 (aged 19)	0	0	(Congolese Football Federation) Inter Club
15	DF	Jhon Kapaya	3 September 2003 (aged 21)	0	0	(Congolese Football Federation) AC Léopards
17	DF	Divin Pachoud De Nzingoula	4 September 2002 (aged 22)	0	0	(Congolese Football Federation) Inter Club
18	DF	Charles Atipo	1 January 1999 (aged 26)	0	0	(Congolese Football Federation) AS Otohô
6	MF	Hergie Mossala	6 March 2003 (aged 22)	2	0	(Congolese Football Federation) AS Otohô
8	MF	Brudel Okana	30 March 2002 (aged 23)	2	0	(Congolese Football Federation) AC Léopards
12	MF	Grâce Nsemi	15 June 2005 (aged 20)	0	0	(Congolese Football Federation) AS Otohô
13	MF	Gosim Duvan Elenga	23 June 2001 (aged 24)	0	0	(Congolese Football Federation) AS Otohô
19	MF	Venold Dzaba	18 May 1998 (aged 27)	0	0	(Congolese Football Federation) Inter Club
21	MF	Chadrack Osseby	31 May 2003 (aged 22)	0	0	(Congolese Football Federation) AC Léopards
25	MF	Gédéon Nongo	27 December 2007 (aged 17)	2	0	(Congolese Football Federation) AS Otohô
7	FW	Wilfrid Nkaya	17 September 1999 (aged 25)	3	0	(Congolese Football Federation) AS Otohô
9	FW	Carlito	24 March 2005 (aged 20)	0	0	(Congolese Football Federation) AS Cheminots
10	FW	Elie Andzouono	2 January 2002 (aged 23)	4	0	(Congolese Football Federation) AS Otohô
11	FW	Japhet Mankou	7 June 2002 (aged 23)	5	1	(Congolese Football Federation) Inter Club
20	FW	Dechan Moussavou	7 August 2006 (aged 18)	1	0	(Congolese Football Federation) AC Léopards
22	FW	Chadrack Ngantsui	28 May 2006 (aged 19)	0	0	(Congolese Football Federation) Étoile du Congo
24	FW	Grâce Mavoungou	18 March 2008 (aged 17)	0	0	(Congolese Football Federation) AS Otohô

=== Sudan ===
Manager: (Ghana) James Kwesi Appiah

No.	Pos.	Player	Date of birth (age)	Caps	Goals	Club
1	GK	Muhamed Alnour Abouja	1 January 2000 (aged 25)	1	0	(Sudan Football Association) Al-Zamala SC
16	GK	Ahmed Alfateh Peter	3 July 1993 (aged 32)	1	0	(Sudan Football Association) Al-Merrikh SC
21	GK	Muhamed Madani	16 October 2005 (aged 19)	0	0	(Sudan Football Association) Al-Hilal SC
2	DF	Musab Makeen	28 May 1996 (aged 29)	4	0	(Sudan Football Association) Al-Merrikh SC
3	DF	Mohamed Ering	20 October 1997 (aged 27)	28	0	(Sudan Football Association) Al-Hilal SC
4	DF	Altayeb Abaker	6 September 1991 (aged 33)	3	0	(Sudan Football Association) Al-Hilal SC
6	DF	Mazen Bashir Simbo	2 October 2001 (aged 23)	2	0	(Sudan Football Association) Al-Hilal SC
12	DF	Awad Zaid	1 January 1993 (aged 32)	14	0	(Sudan Football Association) Al-Merrikh SC
19	DF	Ahmed Tabanja	2 September 2000 (aged 24)	8	0	(Sudan Football Association) Al-Merrikh SC
22	DF	Faris Abdalla (Captain)	19 February 1994 (aged 31)	49	1	(Sudan Football Association) Al-Hilal SC
5	MF	Walieldin Khedr	15 September 1995 (aged 29)	42	2	(Sudan Football Association) Al-Hilal SC
7	MF	Khater Awadallah	1 January 2004 (aged 21)	0	0	(Sudan Football Association) Al-Ahly Wad Madani
8	MF	Abdel Raouf	18 July 1993 (aged 32)	24	0	(Sudan Football Association) Al-Hilal SC
9	MF	Yaser Awad Boshara	15 March 2006 (aged 19)	0	0	(Sudan Football Association) Al-Hilal SC
13	MF	Al Misbah Faisal	1 January 1995 (aged 30)	0	0	(Sudan Football Association) Alamal SC Atbara
15	MF	Salah Adel	3 April 1995 (aged 30)	25	0	(Sudan Football Association) Al-Hilal SC
17	MF	Muhamed Alrasheed	1 July 1994 (aged 31)	31	1	(Sudan Football Association) Al-Merrikh SC
25	MF	Ahmed Esmat	17 March 2006 (aged 19)	2	0	(Sudan Football Association) Al-Hilal SC
10	FW	Muaaz Al-Bakhakh	1 January 1996 (aged 29)	0	0	(Sudan Football Association) Al-Ahly Wad Madani
11	FW	Ali Abdalla	17 March 2003 (aged 22)	4	0	(Sudan Football Association) Al-Hilal SC
14	FW	Mubarak Abdalla	15 July 2003 (aged 22)	0	0	(Sudan Football Association) Al-Merrikh SC
18	FW	Mazin Fadul Al-Bahli	26 July 2008 (aged 17)	2	1	(Sudan Football Association) Hay Al-Wadi SC
20	FW	Yaser Muzmel	15 April 1993 (aged 32)	38	6	(Sudan Football Association) Al-Hilal SC
23	FW	Musa Kanti	27 October 2006 (aged 18)	7	2	(Sudan Football Association) Al-Merrikh SC
24	FW	Muhamed Tia Asad	21 February 2001 (aged 24)	0	0	(Sudan Football Association) Al-Merrikh SC

=== Nigeria ===
Manager: (Mali) Éric Chelle

No.	Pos.	Player	Date of birth (age)	Caps	Goals	Club
1	GK	Ozoemena Henry	22 October 2000 (aged 24)	2	0	(Nigeria Football Federation) Enyimba
16	GK	Mustapha Lawal	18 January 2000 (aged 25)	0	0	(Nigeria Football Federation) 3SC
23	GK	Badmus Nurudeen	12 November 2004 (aged 20)	0	0	(Nigeria Football Federation) Kwara United
26	GK	Ebenezar Harcourt	21 October 2009 (aged 15)	0	0	(Nigeria Football Federation) Sporting Lagos
3	DF	Afeez Bankole	5 May 2004 (aged 21)	0	0	(Nigeria Football Federation) Kwara United
4	DF	Nduka Junior	1 August 2003 (aged 22)	2	1	(Nigeria Football Federation) Remo Stars
5	DF	Leonard Ngenge	12 September 2007 (aged 17)	0	0	(Nigeria Football Federation) Ikorodu City
6	DF	Stephen Manyo	4 October 2000 (aged 24)	2	0	(Nigeria Football Federation) Rivers United
11	DF	Sodiq Ismaila	13 August 2003 (aged 21)	5	1	(Nigeria Football Federation) Remo Stars
12	DF	Austin Harrison	25 October 2005 (aged 19)	0	0	(Nigeria Football Federation) Ikorodu City
13	DF	Taiwo Abdulrafiu	20 April 2002 (aged 23)	0	0	(Nigeria Football Federation) Rivers United
2	MF	Qudus Akanni	2 November 2002 (aged 22)	1	0	(Nigeria Football Federation) Remo Stars
8	MF	Taofeek Otaniyi	11 June 2006 (aged 19)	0	0	(Nigeria Football Federation) Rivers United
10	MF	Olamilekan Adedayo	9 August 2001 (aged 23)	0	0	(Nigeria Football Federation) Remo Stars
17	MF	Tochukwu Raymond	30 November 2003 (aged 21)	0	0	(Nigeria Football Federation) Remo Stars
18	MF	Hadi Haruna	9 February 2001 (aged 24)	0	0	(Nigeria Football Federation) Remo Stars
20	MF	Alex Oyowah	7 January 2004 (aged 21)	0	0	(Nigeria Football Federation) Remo Stars
7	FW	Jabbar Malik	30 December 2003 (aged 21)	0	0	(Nigeria Football Federation) Remo Stars
9	FW	Godwin Obaje	12 March 1996 (aged 29)	0	0	(Nigeria Football Federation) Enugu Rangers
14	FW	Anas Yusuf	1 February 2004 (aged 21)	1	0	(Nigeria Football Federation) Nasarawa United
15	FW	Antoine Ijoma	7 May 2005 (aged 20)	0	0	(Nigeria Football Federation) Abia Warriors
19	FW	Sikiru Alimi	23 March 1996 (aged 29)	5	2	(Nigeria Football Federation) Remo Stars
21	FW	Shola Adelani	10 December 2006 (aged 18)	0	0	(Nigeria Football Federation) Ikorodu City
22	FW	Vincent Temitope	10 July 1998 (aged 27)	0	0	(Nigeria Football Federation) Plateau United
