= Enock Ssebaggala =

Ugandan footballer (born 2000)

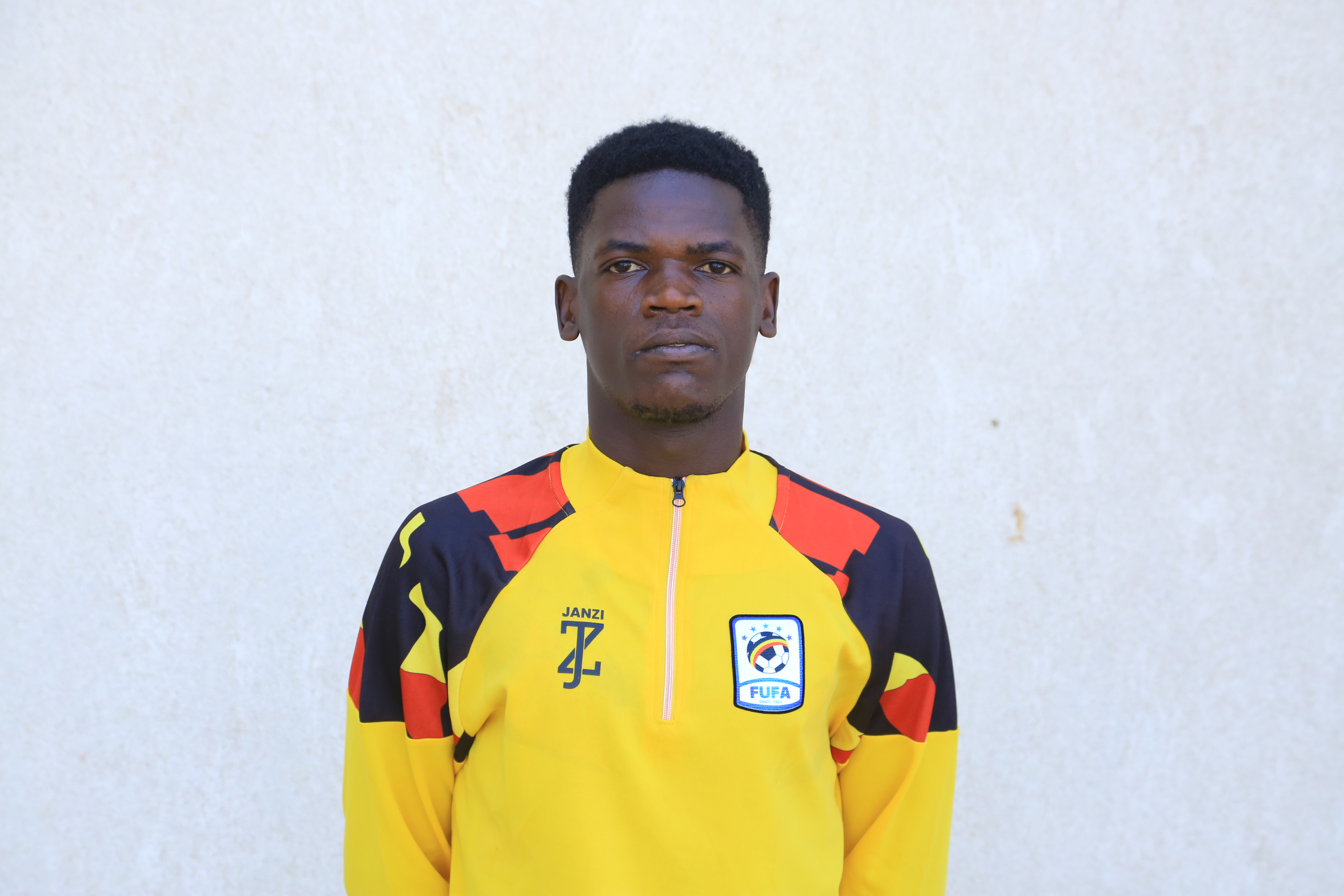

Personal information
- Full name: Enock Ssebaggala
- Date of birth: 28 July 2000 (age 26)
- Place of birth: Uganda
- Position: Attacking midfielder

Team information
- Current team: Vipers SC
- Number: 8

Senior career*
Years	Team	Apps	(Gls)
2019–2023	Express FC	42	
2023–2025	NEC FC	26	(4)
2025–	Vipers SC		

International career^{‡}
2025–	Uganda	1	(0)
- * Club domestic league appearances and goals as of 12 July 2025 ‡ National team caps and goals as of 15 July 2025

Enock Ssebaggala (born 28 July 2000) is a Ugandan professional footballer who plays as a midfielder for Vipers SC in the Uganda Premier League and the Uganda national team.

== Club career ==
=== Express FC ===
Ssebaggala began his senior career with Express FC, one of Uganda's most historic clubs, where he played for four seasons and featured in 42 Uganda Premier League matches.

=== NEC FC ===
In August 2023, Ssebaggala joined NEC FC, bringing his creative midfield presence to the club. The 2024–25 season proved particularly remarkable; he played a pivotal role in helping NEC FC finish as runners-up in the Uganda Premier League.

=== Vipers SC ===
In July 2025, Ssebaggala completed a two-year contract with Vipers SC, the reigning Uganda Premier League champions, becoming the club’s second signing of that transfer window. He was unveiled as a "midfield maestro" and will wear the number 8 jersey.

== International career ==
Ssebaggala made his senior international debut for the Uganda Cranes in 2025 during a friendly match that ended in a 1–1 draw against Gambia. He was also named in Uganda’s squad for the upcoming African Nations Championship (CHAN) tournament scheduled for August 2025.

== Honours ==
NEC FC Awards (2024–25):

- Best Midfielder of the Season
- Players’ Player of the Season

== See also ==
- Allan Okello
- Abdul Karim Watambala
- Reagan Mpande
