= Vipers Junior Team =

Football development team in Uganda

- Full name: Vipers Junior Team
- Nickname: Junior Venoms
- Founded: 2015
- Ground: St. Mary’s Stadium, Kitende
- Capacity: 15,000
- Owner: Lawrence Mulindwa
- Chairman: Lawrence Mulindwa
- Coach: Ronald Ssali
- League: FUFA Juniors League
- Website: viperssc.co.ug

Vipers Junior Team (commonly known as Vipers JT) is the official youth side of Ugandan association football club Vipers SC, competing in the FUFA Juniors League, the national U-17/U-18 championship for youth academies of Uganda Premier League clubs.

== History ==
Vipers Junior Team was formed in 2015 to provide a structured pathway for young players into senior professional football. The team immediately became one of the most competitive youth sides in Uganda.

=== FUFA Juniors League success ===
The Junior Venoms have had consistent success in the FUFA Juniors League:

- In the 2015–16 season, they won their first title after defeating KCCA Soccer Academy on penalties.
- In the 2017–18 season, Vipers JT won again by beating Onduparaka Junior Team 1–0 in the final, with Sula Mpanga scoring the winner. Moses Bakabulindi was named MVP of the season.
- In the 2022–23 season, Vipers JT dominated the Buganda Region league, finishing with 68 points and striker Olimi Nyarwa Bitanywaine scoring 25 goals. They went on to defeat Friends of Soccer 6–0 at FUFA Technical Centre, Njeru, in the national finals phase.

== Notable players ==
Several Vipers JT graduates have represented Uganda at youth international level:

- Gavin Kizito Mugweri
- Najib Yiga
- Ivan Asaba
- Yasin Abdu Owane

These four players were selected for the Uganda U-17 national team squad that played at the 2019 U-17 African Cup of Nations.

== Honours ==
- FUFA Juniors League
  - Winners: 2015–16, 2017–18, 2022–23

== See also ==
- Vipers SC
- Lawrence Mulindwa
