= Jacob Okao =

Ugandan footballer

Personal information
- Full name: Jacob Okao
- Date of birth: April 4, 2001 (age 25)
- Place of birth: Uganda
- Position: Defender

Team information
- Current team: NEC FC

Youth career
- Blessed Sacrament Kimanya SS
- St. Mary’s Kitende
- Vipers Juniors

Senior career*
Years	Team	Apps	(Gls)
2019	Kataka FC		
2019	Mbarara City FC		
2019–2022	Vipers SC		
2022	→ UPDF FC (loan)		
2022–2024	Maroons FC		
2024–Present	NEC FC		
- * Club domestic league appearances and goals

Jacob Okao (born 4 April 2001) is a Ugandan professional footballer who plays as a defender for National Enterprises Corporation FC (NEC FC) in the Uganda Premier League and the Uganda national football team.

== Early life and education ==
Okao attended Blessed Sacrament Kimanya Secondary School and later joined St. Mary’s Kitende (SMASK).

== Club career ==
=== Kataka FC and Mbarara City ===
Okao began his senior career with Kataka FC in the FUFA Big League. In February 2019, he joined Mbarara City FC.

=== Vipers SC ===
In 2019, Okao signed for Vipers SC, making his Uganda Premier League debut on 10 January 2020, against Kyetume FC. He made eight appearances in his debut season.

=== Loan to UPDF FC ===
In January 2022, Okao joined UPDF FC on loan for the remainder of the 2021–22 season.

=== Maroons FC ===
In September 2022, Okao signed a two-year deal with Maroons FC, where he became a regular starter.

=== NEC FC ===
In July 2024, Okao joined NEC FC on a two-year contract. During the 2024–25 Uganda Premier League season, NEC FC finished second in the league, conceding only 19 goals. Okao was named the club’s Player of the Season.

== Style of play ==
Okao has been considered to be a strong defender, good at one-on-one duels, and comfortable in possession.

== Honours ==
Individual

- NEC FC Player of the Season: 2024–25
