= BUL FC Junior Team =

Football development team in Uganda

- Full name: BUL Football Club Junior Team
- Nickname: The Young Oilers
- Founded: 2015
- Ground: FUFA Technical Center, Njeru, Uganda
- Capacity: 3,000
- Owner: BUL Football Club
- Chairman: Ronald Barente
- League: FUFA Juniors League
- 2023–24: Winners
Home colours

BUL FC Junior Team (BUL FC JT) is a Ugandan youth football team based in Jinja. It is the academy side of BUL FC, a club that competes in the Uganda Premier League. The junior team was established in 2015 to take part in the FUFA Juniors League, a national competition for under-17 and under-18 teams affiliated with Uganda Premier League clubs.

== History ==
BUL FC JT was formed in 2015 when the Federation of Uganda Football Associations (FUFA) made it compulsory for all top-flight clubs to create junior teams.

In the 2018–19 season, BUL FC JT won its first FUFA Juniors League title, defeating KCCA Soccer Academy in the final.

The team won the competition again in 2022–23, finishing level on points with KCCA Soccer Academy but winning the championship on goal difference.

In 2023–24, BUL FC JT won their third title after a 1–0 victory against KCCA Soccer Academy in the final played at the FUFA Technical Center, Njeru.

== Development role ==
BUL FC JT acts as the development side for the BUL FC senior team. The club’s youth structure has produced several players who have progressed to the senior squad and to other Uganda Premier League clubs. The FUFA Juniors League itself was designed to nurture young players and provide a pathway to professional football.

== Notable graduates ==
Notable players who have featured for BUL FC Junior Team before playing senior football include:

- Richard Wandyaka – later promoted to BUL FC first team.
- Douglas Muganga – joined BUL FC senior squad.
- Hamisi Tibita – represented BUL FC in the Uganda Premier League.

== Achievements ==
- FUFA Juniors League champions (3): 2018–19, 2022–23, 2023–24

== Home ground ==
The junior team plays its home matches at the FUFA Technical Center, Njeru, which also hosts games for the BUL FC senior side.

== See also ==
- BUL FC
- FUFA Juniors League
- Uganda Premier League
