= Emmanuel Kalyowa =

Ugandan footballer (born 2004)

Personal information
- Full name: Emmanuel Kalyowa
- Date of birth: 1 January 1997 (age 29)
- Height: 1.85 m (6 ft 1 in)
- Position: Goalkeeper

Team information
- Current team: Express FC

Senior career*
Years	Team	Apps	(Gls)
2015–Present	Express FC		
- * Club domestic league appearances and goals

Emmanuel Kalyowa (born 1 January 1997) is a Ugandan professional footballer who plays as a goalkeeper for Express FC in the Uganda premier league.

== Club career ==
Kalyowa began his career with Express FC, in October 2015. In February 2016, he moved to Lweza FC and in August 2021, he joined BUL FC from Nyamityobora FC. He later signed with Kiyovu Sports Club in the Rwanda Premier League. In August 2024, Kalyowa returned to Express FC.

== Honors ==
Stanbic Uganda Cup: 2021–22 (Best Goalkeeper)

== See also ==
- Denis Onyango
- Denis Kiggundu
