= Express FC Junior Team =

Football development team in Uganda

- Full name: Express Football Club Junior Team
- Nickname: The Red Eagles Juniors
- Ground: Kampala, Uganda
- Owner: Express FC
- League: FUFA Juniors League

Express FC Junior Team is the youth development side of Express Football Club, based in Kampala, Uganda. The team competes in the FUFA Juniors League and serves as a feeder system to the senior Express FC squad.

== History ==
The junior setup of Express FC was created to nurture young footballers and provide a pathway to the senior team. In 2012, the Express U-16 side won the inaugural Uganda Super League youth football championship, defeating Maroons FC JT 1–0 in the final.

In September 2020, Sadat Mugenyi, Kevin Ssekimbega, Derrick Lubega Mulumba, and Desmond Kanene were promoted from the junior team to the senior squad.

== Structure and development ==
The team draws talent through the Express Soccer Academy, which trains players from under-10 up to under-20 levels.

Express FC Junior Team regularly competes in the FUFA Juniors League and other national youth tournaments, providing young players with competitive match experience.

== Notable graduates ==
Several players have graduated from the junior ranks to professional football:

- Sadat Mugenyi, goalkeeper, promoted in 2020.
- Kevin Ssekimbega, defender, promoted in 2020.
- Faisal Ssekyanzi, former FUFA Juniors League MVP, later joined Onduparaka FC.

== Recent performance ==
In the 2025 FUFA Juniors League season, Express FC JT drew 0–0 with URA FC JT, reflecting their continued participation in national youth football.

== See also ==
- Express Football Club
- FUFA Juniors League
- URA FC Junior Team
