= Sekou Sylla =

Sekou Sylla may refer to:

- Sekou Sylla, Guinean football midfielder; played for Guinea at the 1980 African Cup of Nations
- Sekou Sylla (footballer, born 1992), Guinean football striker
- Sekou Sylla (footballer, born 1993), Guinean football goalkeeper; played for Guinea at the 2024 African Nations Championship
- Sekou Sylla (footballer, born 1999), Guinean football full-back
