= Lawrence Mulindwa =

Ugandan Sports Proprietor and teacher

Dr. Lawrence Mulindwa
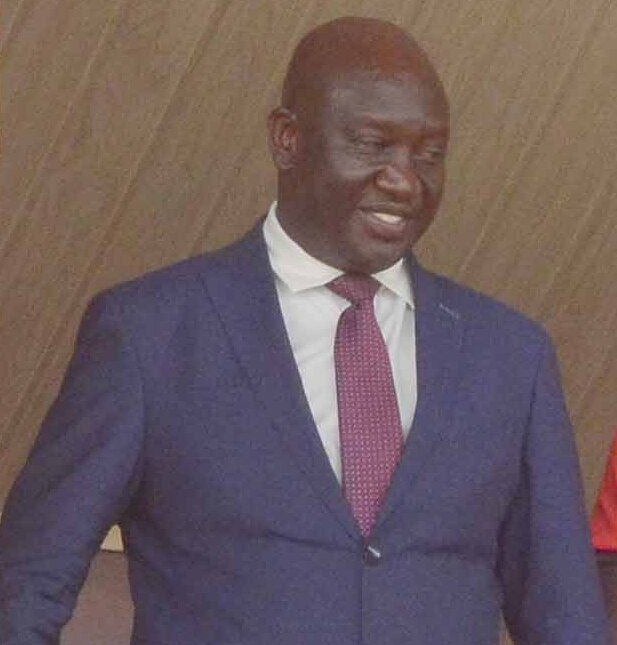
- Mulindwa in 2023
- Born: Lawrence Mulindwa; 27 March 1965 (age 61); Mpigi, Uganda
- Occupations: Educator, businessman and entrepreneur
- Known for: Former FUFA President, Vipers SC Current President
- Spouse: Milly Mulindwa
- Parent(s): Late Catherine Mulindwa and late Mulindwa

Lawrence Mulindwa (born 27 March 1965) is a Ugandan businessman, educator, and entrepreneur who serves as the director and the president of a football club, Vipers SC. He was the former president of the Uganda football governing board, FUFA where he served for nine years from 2005 to 2013, the second longest serving FUFA president after Kabaka Daudi Chwa in (1924-1932).

He is also the executive director and former Head teacher of St. Mary's Boarding Secondary School Kitende.

He is Vipers SC's majority shareholder and a back bone of the eight-time Uganda Premier League winners with 90% shares. He started his administration career as a Chairman of Bunamwaya FC now known as Vipers SC from 2000 to 2004. Later on he left that position to Tadeus Kitandwe to contest for FUFA presidency which he later achieved on 17 December 2005, after beating Chris Rwanika who was his immediate rival.

== Early life and education background ==
Mulindwa was born in 1965 at Kanyike Kamengo, Mpigi, Uganda to Edward and Catherine Mulindwa. He went to Kamengo Primary School for his primary education and joined Namilyango College for his secondary education. After senior six, he joined Makerere University and graduated with a Bachelor's degree Statistics. He earned a Postgraduate Teaching Diploma in Education and also Master of Business Administration(MBA) all from Makerere University.

== Personal life ==
Mulindwa is married to Milly Mulindwa their marriage has lasted over 25 years and they have sons and daughters, Steven Mulindwa, Claire Mulindwa, Carol Mulindwa, Stuart Mulindwa

== Career ==
=== FUFA president ===
During his time as president of the Federation of Uganda Football Associations (FUFA), he settled outstanding debts for the Federation which included recovery of the land title for the FUFA House in Mengo. He also added capacity building courses and the Uganda Cranes was unbeaten at home for eight years.

Inter-regional competitions were re-instated, FUFA awards were introduced, Uganda lifted the Cecafa Senior Challenge Cup four times, and more sponsorship deals from many companies were signed; as well as enjoying relations with fans, Government, CAF and FIFA.

=== Viper sports club ===
In 2013, he left FUFA, to put his attention on Vipers SC football club with the aim and dream of making it the best Football Club in Uganda and on the African continent. This enabled the club to win six league titles, also triumphed in Uganda Cup, Fufa Super Cup and Fufa Super 8 Cup and also qualify for the CAF Champions League group stages becoming only the second Ugandan club to do so after KCCA.

In March 2017, the football investor became the first Ugandan to own a private stadium called St. Mary's Stadium-Kitende. This was officially opened to the public with a CAF Confederation cup game against Platinum Stars from South Africa which the Venoms beat 1–0. It was expanded to 600 more VIP seats totaling 1,500 VIP seats and 25,000 overall seats, making it the second largest stadium in Uganda.

In 2019, He unveiled a factory manufactured club bus, the first in Uganda with a club name on the number plate, and opened a state of the art gym at the stadium.

=== St. Mary's boarding secondary school, Kitende ===
In 2001, Lawrence Mulindwa started a secondary school, St. Mary's Boarding Secondary School Kitende, commonly called St. Mary's Kitende to provide a world class education and promote sports in Uganda. The school has since gone on to become a leading academic and sports institution. It has been consistently ranked as the best in both Uganda Certificate of Education (UCE) and Uganda Advanced Certificate of Education (UACE), not without controversy.

The school is also a sports giant in Uganda as well as in East Africa. In Uganda, it holds the highest number of cup wins (11) in high school football, joint with Kibuli SS. In East African high school games, the school won the boys' football cup for ten consecutive years between 2003 and 2013 and the female's netball cup for a record 14 consecutive years between 2003 and 2017.

The school is credited with extending good education to Ugandans from all walks of life due to its inclusivity compared to more selective traditional schools.

St. Mary's Kitende is also well known for developing players who eventually got selected for the Senior team, including

- Paul Mucureezi
- Geoffrey Wasswa
- Ismail Watenga
- Murushid Juuko
- Dan Wagaluka
- Ibrahim Juma
- Muhammad Shaban
- Mike Mutyaba
- Nicholas Wadada
- Farouk Miya
- Godfrey Walusimbi
- Milton Karisa
- Bobosi Byaruhanga
- Jean Sseninde

== Recognition ==
On 13 December 2018, he was awarded an honorary doctorate degree from London graduate school in honour of his contributions towards development of education and sports which he received during the 15th Dubai leadership summit in UAE.
