= Arafat Kiza Usama =

Ugandan footballer (born 2000)

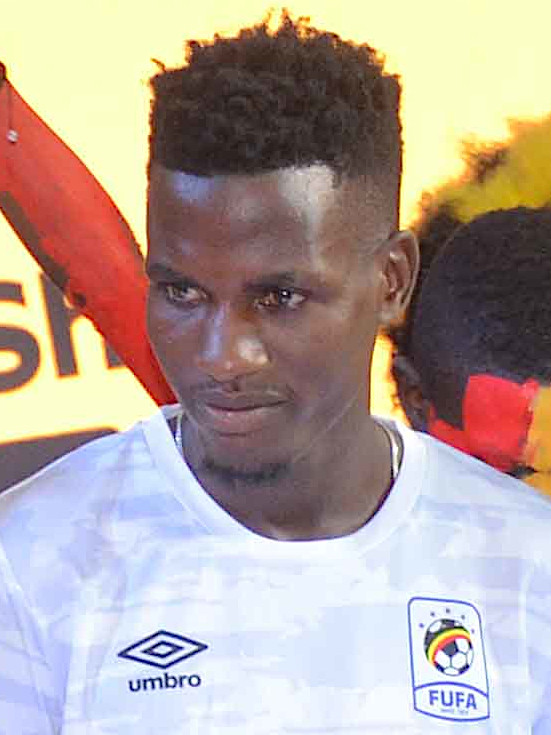
- Arafat Kiza Usama

Personal information
- Date of birth: 27 June 2004 (age 22)
- Place of birth: Kampala, Uganda
- Position: Midfielder

Team information
- Current team: KCCA
- ‡ National team caps and goals as of 23:54, 14 February 2021 (UTC)

Arafat Kiza Usama (born 27 June 2004) is a Ugandan professional footballer who plays as a forward for Vipers SC in the Uganda Premier League.

== Early life and youth career ==
Arafat Kiza Usama was born on June 27, 2004 at Mbale hospital to Mr Khassim Kiiza and Ziada Mutesi. He is a brother to Uganda Cranes goalkeeper, Ismail Watenga. Inspired by his football-endowed family and friends, Usama began his football journey at a young age, showing promise and talent that would later define his professional career. He initially played for Kajjansi United, a regional league side, where he honed his skills and developed his game.

== Club career ==
Usama's impressive performance in the Masaza Cup with Busiro County caught the attention of top clubs. In 2021, he made a significant move to KCCA FC, one of the top clubs in the Uganda Premier League (UPL). In the 2023/24 season, Usama emerged as one of the standout performers for KCCA FC, attracting interest from international clubs. In 2024, Egyptian Premier League club ZED FC and Moroccan club Wydad AC expressed strong interest in signing Usama, highlighting his rising profile in African football.

== International career ==
Usama earned his first cap for the Uganda national team on October 13, 2023, in a match against Mali. Since then, he has made two international appearances, showcasing his skills on the national stage.

== Playing style ==
As a midfielder, Usama is known for his agility, vision, and ability to control the tempo of the game. His contributions both in defense and attack make him a versatile player on the field.
