= Paul Mucureezi =

Ugandan association football player (born 1993)

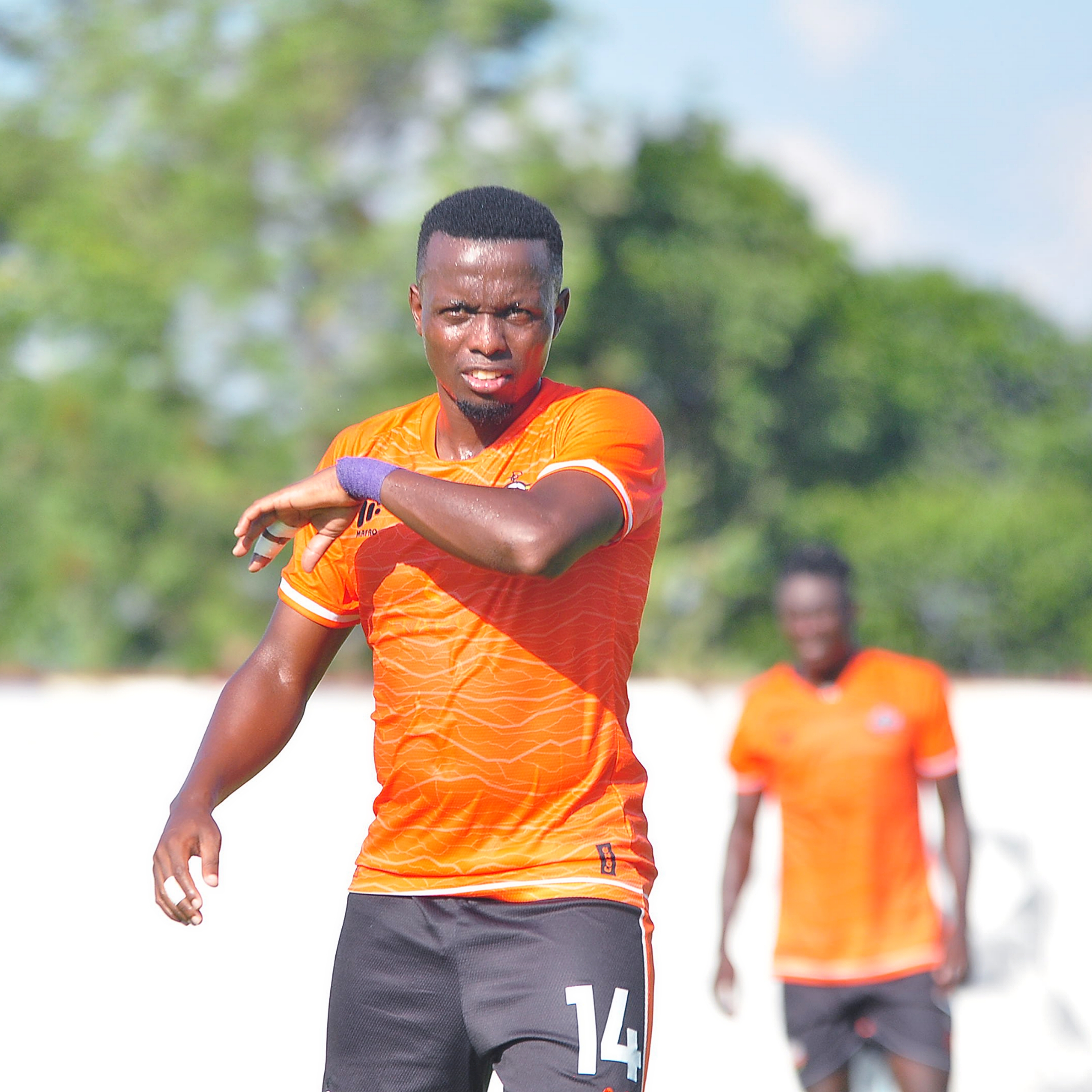

Personal information
- Full name: Paul Mucureezi
- Date of birth: 11 February 1993 (age 33)
- Place of birth: Ntungamo, Uganda
- Height: 1.68 m (5 ft 6 in)
- Position: [forward

Youth career
- nyanja football club

Senior career*
Years	Team	Apps	(Gls)
2014–2015	Mutundwe Lions	16	(8)
2015–2018	KCCA	54	(22)
2018–2019	Mbarara City	25	(16)
2019–2022	Vipers SC	37	(18)
2023–2024	Kitara FC	24	(15)
2024–2026	National Enterprises Corporation FC	40	(18)

International career^{‡}
2017–	Uganda	9	(4)
- * Club domestic league appearances and goals as of 11 February 2023 ‡ National team caps and goals as of 11 February 2023

Paul Mucureezi (born 11 February 1993) is a Ugandan footballer who formerly played as a midfielder for National Enterprises Corporation FC in the Uganda Premier League.

== Club career ==
Paul Mucureezi started his football career at KCCA FC from 2015 to 2018, he then moved to Mbarara City FC for the 2018 to 2019 season. He was later signed by Vipers SC in 2019 to 2022, played for Kitara FC from 2023 to 2024 and currently plays for National Enterprises Corporation FC. He is a member of the Anglican Church of Uganda.

== International career ==
=== International goals ===
Scores and results list Uganda's goal tally first.

No.	Date	Venue	Opponent	Score	Result	Competition
1.	22 July 2017	Philip Omondi Stadium, Kampala, Uganda	South Sudan	2–0	5–1	2018 African Nations Championship qualification
2.	22 July 2017	Philip Omondi Stadium, Kampala, Uganda	South Sudan	3–0	5–1	2018 African Nations Championship qualification
3.	22 July 2017	Philip Omondi Stadium, Kampala, Uganda	South Sudan	4–0	5–1	2018 African Nations Championship qualification
4.	22 July 2017	Philip Omondi Stadium, Kampala, Uganda	South Sudan	5–0	5–1	2018 African Nations Championship qualification
