= Gideon Odongo =

Ugandan footballer (born 1999)

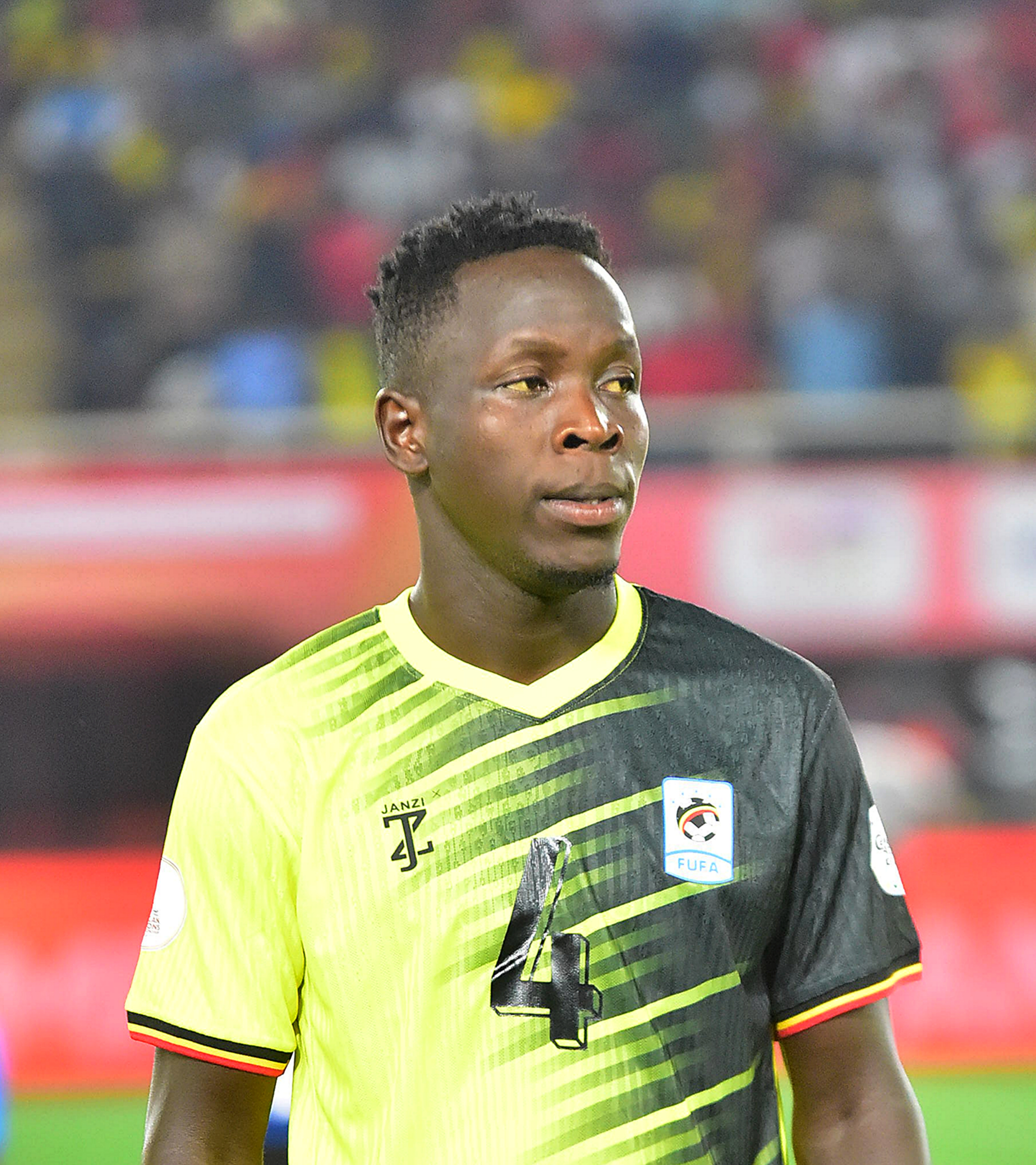

Personal information
- Full name: Gideon Odongo
- Date of birth: November 20, 1999 (age 26)
- Position: Defender

Team information
- Current team: NEC FC

Senior career*
Years	Team	Apps	(Gls)
2022–Present	NEC FC		

International career^{‡}
2024–Present	Uganda	1	
- * Club domestic league appearances and goals as of 30 August 2025 ‡ National team caps and goals as of 30 August 2025

Gideon Odongo (born 20 November 1999) is a Ugandan professional footballer who plays as a defender for NEC FC in the Uganda Premier League and the Uganda national football team.

== Club career ==
Odongo joined NEC FC during their FUFA Big League campaign in 2022 and was part of the squad as the club rose to the top flight for the 2023–24 season. He established himself at left-back in the Uganda Premier League.

On 1 March 2025, Odongo scored in NEC FC's 2–0 league victory over Lugazi FC at Lugogo. Statistical services list him as a defender/left-back for NEC FC across the 2024–25 season.

In July 2025, NEC FC confirmed their maiden appearance in the CAF Confederation Cup, with Odongo among the players featured in the club's coverage of the campaign build-up.

== International career ==
Odongo received his first senior call to the Uganda Cranes in 2024 for African Nations Championship (CHAN) preparations and regional engagements, and was named in Uganda's provisional squad for CHAN 2024 (played in August 2025) hosted by Kenya, Uganda and Tanzania.

He featured for Uganda during the CHAN period and was referenced in domestic press coverage of the tournament matches. National-team databases list one full (FIFA-A) cap for Odongo in 2024, with CHAN appearances recorded separately.

== Career statistics ==
International

Statistics per National-Football-Teams.com (FIFA ‘A’ matches only).

National team	Year	Apps	Goals
Uganda	2024	1	0
Total		1	0

== Honours ==
- NEC FC – Uganda Premier League runners-up: 2024–25.

== See also ==
- Denis Omedi
- Reagan Mpande
- Allan Okello
