= Chrispas Kusiima =

Ugandan footballer

Crispas Kusiima
Personal information
- Date of birth: April 10, 1993 (age 33)
- Height: 1.75 m (5 ft 9 in)
- Position: Goalkeeper

Team information
- Current team: Uganda Revenue Authority FC
- Number: 13

Senior career*
Years	Team	Apps	(Gls)
2016–2017	URA FC		
2018–2019	Tooro United FC		
2020–2021	Express FC		
2022–2023	Gaddafi FC		
2023–2025	Kitara		

International career
2024–2025	Uganda		
- * Club domestic league appearances and goals

Crispas Kusiima (born 10 April 1993) is a Ugandan professional footballer who plays as a goalkeeper for Uganda Premier League club URA.

== Club career ==
=== Uganda Revenue Authority football club (URA FC) ===
In 2016, Kusiima joined the Uganda Revenue Authority football club, however, he struggled to get playing time due to the stiff competition. This led him to leave the club so as to find a club that would give him more playing time. He then joined football clubs like Tooro United football club for the 2018/19 season, Express Football club for the 2020/21 season where he helped them win the 2020/21 Uganda Premier League title, and Gaddaffi football club for the 2022/23 season, before joining Kitara football club.

=== Kitara football club (the Royals) ===
In 2023, Kusiima joined Kitara football club also known as the Royals, where he helped them to a top five league finish and their first ever Stanbic Uganda cup victory which secured then a spot in the CAF Confederation Cup. In the 2024/25 Uganda Premier League season, Kusiima made twenty seven appearances and sixteen clean sheets that earned him the Golden Glove Award. Kusiima featured in sixty two matches keeping thirty two clean sheets from the 2022/23, 2034/24 and 2024/25 Uganda Premier League season. This consistency got him selected in the Uganda Cranes local based squad ahead of the 2024 African Nations Championship.

=== Uganda Revenue Authority Football club (URA FC) ===
In July 2025, Kusiima returned to URA FC, on a two-year contract from Kitara football club.

== International career ==
Kusiima was first selected on the Uganda national football team squad that participated in the 2024 CHAN tournament. The 2024 African Nations Championship was co-hosted by Uganda, Kenya, and Tanzania from 2nd to 30th August 2025.

== Honours ==
=== Express football club ===
- 2020/21 Uganda Premier League title.

=== Individual ===
- Golden glove award for the 2024/25 Uganda Premier League season.

== See also ==
- Ismail Watenga
- Nafian Alionzi
- Joel Mutakubwa
- Charles Lukwago
