= URA FC Junior Team =

Football development team in Uganda

- Full name: Uganda Revenue Authority Football Club Junior Team
- Nickname: The Junior Tax Collectors
- Founded: 2015
- Owner: Uganda Revenue Authority
- League: FUFA Juniors League

URA FC Junior Team is the under-17 side of Uganda Revenue Authority FC, competing in the FUFA Juniors League. The team was established in 2015 following the introduction of a compulsory youth competition under the FUFA club licensing regulations.

== History ==
The FUFA Juniors League was launched in 2015 as part of youth development reforms in Ugandan football. URA FC Junior Team was created to serve as a feeder side for URA FC, giving opportunities to players under the age of 17.

== Performance ==
URA FC Junior Team has recorded notable results in the Juniors League:

- In April 2017, they beat Police Armless Brigade JT 3–1, with Abdul Nasser Ssegabwe scoring a hat-trick.
- In December 2019, the team defeated Onduparaka JT 6–2 in Arua. Brian Ojok scored a hat-trick, Richard Akena a brace, and Anwari Awadh added another.
- In July 2025, URA FC JT defeated UPDF FC JT 5–2, with Kanyike Abdul Karim scoring four goals and Mutebi Rahman adding another.

== Player development ==
The junior side has produced players who have gone on to feature for the URA FC senior team. In 2020, three players; Alex Akankwasa, Sam Mpoza and John Kokas Alou were promoted to the first team.

Several URA FC Junior Team players have also represented Uganda at youth international level, including John Kokas Alou with the Uganda U17 team at the 2019 Africa U-17 Cup of Nations.

== See also ==
- Uganda Revenue Authority FC
- FUFA Juniors League
- KCCA Soccer Academy
