= Livingstone Mulondo =

Ugandan footballer (born 1996)

Personal information
- Full name: Livingstone Mulondo
- Date of birth: 10 October 1996 (age 30)
- Position: Defender

Team information
- Current team: Vipers SC

Livingstone Mulondo (born 15 October 1996) is a Ugandan professional footballer who plays as a defender for Uganda Premier League club Vipers SC.

== Personal life ==
Livingstone has played in the CAF Champions League, Uganda Cup and Uganda Premier League, he has been active since 2018.

== Football career ==
Livingstone has 7 caps for the Uganda National Football Team. His first cap for the cranes was against Rwanda on 10 October 2021.

He joined Vipers SC in 2018 from Kiira. In 2021, Livingstone equalized against Express FC in the last minute of the game at Wankulukuku stadium, he also in 2023 scored the only goal against UPDF at Bombo in the 10th Minute amidst heavy downpour and helped Vipers SC to 20 points in the league.
