= Marvin Joseph Youngman =

Ugandan association footballer

Personal information
- Full name: Marvin Joseph Youngman
- Date of birth: 5 May 1998 (age 28)
- Place of birth: Fort Portal, Uganda
- Height: 1.83 m (6 ft 0 in)
- Position: Central midfielder

Team information
- Current team: Vipers SC
- Number: 22

Youth career
- 2009-2017: Friend of Soccer Academy
- 2018: Busujju
- 2019: Bulemezi
- 2017-2019: Hima FC

Senior career*
Years	Team	Apps	(Gls)
2020-2022	Soltilo Bright Stars FC	50	(4)
2022-2024	Vipers SC	19	
2024	Soltilo Bright Stars FC	12	
2025-Present	Vipers SC	30	
- * Club domestic league appearances and goals

Marvin Joseph Youngman (born May 5, 1998) is a Ugandan professional footballer who plays as a Central Midfielder for Vipers SC. Joseph Youngman was born in Fort Portal to Michael Asaba and Eve Asaba. Youngman was called up for national team duty as Uganda Cranes kicked off early preparations for the 2023 AFCON Qualifiers.

== Education background ==
Youngman attended St. Charles Lwanga Nursery, Buhinga Primary School, Fort Portal SS, Kibiito SS, St. Juliana High School, and Masaka SS before launching his football career with Bright Stars FC. He started youth football at Friends of Soccer Academy in Fort Portal under coach Gore Muhammad and featured in regional and school tournaments like the Airtel Rising Stars and Masaza Cup (for Busujju and Bulemeezi).

== Club career ==
Vipers Sports Club, 2022– 2024, 2025-present: Soltilo Bright Stars FC, 2020– 2022: Hima FC (Kasese), Busujju (Saza team), Bulemezi (Saza team), Friend of Soccer Academy (Fort Portal).

== Honours ==
Vipers Sports Club

- Uganda Premier League: 2022/23, 2024/25, 2025/26
- Uganda Cup: 2023, 2025
- Uganda Super Cup: 2026
