= FUFA Juniors League =

- Founded: 2015
- Country: Uganda
- Confederation: FUFA
- Number of clubs: 16 (2025 season)
- Level on pyramid: Youth (U-17/U-18)
- Current: 2025 FUFA Juniors League

The FUFA Juniors League is a Ugandan national youth football competition organized by the FUFA. Established in 2015, the league serves as a developmental platform for players under 17 and under 18, involving youth teams affiliated with Uganda Premier League clubs.

== History ==
The inaugural FUFA Juniors League kicked off on 17 May 2015 at Lugogo’s Phillip Omondi Stadium, featuring 13 U-17 teams divided into two groups. KCC Academy claimed victory in the opening match, defeating Vipers JT 1–0 in the presence of FUFA President Moses Magogo.

Participation later became mandatory for all clubs in the Uganda Premier League as part of FUFA’s club licensing regulations.

== Format ==
As of 2025, the league features 16 junior teams, each representing a Uganda Premier League club. They are divided into two groups Treble and Hat-trick each with eight teams.

=== Player eligibility ===
- 5 players born in 2007 (including at least one goalkeeper)
- 15 players born in 2008–2009 (including one goalkeeper)
- 5 players born in 2010 (including one goalkeeper)

Each squad may register up to 25 players, with parental consent and proof of identification required.

== Purpose and development role ==
The FUFA Juniors League is designed as a feeder system for Uganda’s youth national teams, particularly the U-17 Cubs. It provides competitive exposure to young players and prepares them for international tournaments such as the AFCON U-17.

== Participating teams ==
The 2025 edition of the FUFA Juniors League features 16 teams divided into two groups:

=== Treble Group ===
- BUL FC JT
- Express FC JT
- Gaddafi FC JT
- Kitara FC JT
- Mbarara City FC JT
- NEC FC JT
- URA FC JT
- Vipers Junior Team

=== Hat-trick Group ===
- Bright Stars FC JT
- KCCA Soccer Academy (SA)
- Lugazi FC JT
- Maroons FC JT
- Mbale Heroes FC JT
- SC Villa JT
- Wakiso Giants FC JT
- Jinja North United JT

== Season-by-season champions ==
Season	Champion	Runner-up	Notes
2015–16	Vipers Junior Team	Onduparaka JT	First edition completed; Vipers JT crowned champions
2016–17	KCCA Soccer Academy	Soana JT	
2017–18	Vipers Junior Team	KCCA Soccer Academy	Vipers JT win second title
2018–19	Police Armless Brigade JT	Onduparaka JT	Surprise winners
2019–20	SC Villa JT	BUL JT	Season completed before COVID-19 disruptions
2020–21	No competition held due to COVID-19 pandemic		
2021–22	BUL JT	URA JT	Return of the competition
2022–23	BUL JT	KCCA Soccer Academy	Third title for Vipers JT
2023–24	BUL JT	KCCA Soccer Academy	Richard Okello scores in 1–0 final win
2024–25	Ongoing	–	Season in progress

== Notable clubs ==
- Vipers Junior Team – (2015–16, 2017–18)
- KCCA Soccer Academy
- BUL FC Junior Team – (2022–23, 2023–24 champions
