= Felix Oluoch =

Kenyan professional footballer

Personal information
- Full name: Felix Oluoch
- Place of birth: Kenya

Team information
- Current team: Gor Mahia

Senior career*
Years	Team	Apps	(Gls)
- Chemelil Sugar FC
- FC Kariobangi Sharks
- Bandari F.C. (Kenya)
- Posta Rangers
2023-	Gor Mahia		

International career
2024-	Kenya		
- * Club domestic league appearances and goals

Felix Oluoch is a Kenyan footballer who plays for Kenyan Premier League side Gor Mahia and Kenya's national team, Harambee Stars.

== Career ==
Oluoch formerly turned out for Kenyan Premier League sides Chemelil Sugar FC, FC Kariobangi Sharks, Bandari F.C. (Kenya), and Posta Rangers before joining Gor Mahia.

He was part of the Kenyan squad that featured in the 2024 African Nations Championship held across East Africa in August 2025.
