= Mamady Mara =

Guinean footballer (born 2008)

Personal information
- Date of birth: 8 March 2008 (age 18)
- Place of birth: Conakry, Guinea
- Position: Left-back

Team information
- Current team: Horoya AC
- Number: 2

Youth career
- Horoya

Senior career*
Years	Team	Apps	(Gls)
2023–	Horoya		

International career^{‡}
2025-	Guinea		
- * Club domestic league appearances and goals as of 24 June 2026 ‡ National team caps and goals as of 6 March 2026

Mamady Mara (born 8 March 2008) is a Guinean professional footballer who plays as a left-back for Horoya.

== Club career ==
Mara is a youth product of Aiglons Club de CBA and Académie Football Antonio Souaré, before joining top flight team Horoya AC, where he established himself as one of the brightest prospects of the Guinée Championnat National by the 2024–25 season.

Early 2026, his domestic form saw him linked to the likes of Ligue 1 club AS Monaco.

== International career ==
Mara is a youth international for Guinea, having played for the under-17 team.

Mara was selected with the Guinea senior team, in the summer 2025, for the African Nations Championship.
