= Austine Odongo =

Kenyan professional footballer

Austine Odongo (Born 8 Mar 2007) is a Kenyan footballer who turns out for Kenyan Premier League side Shabana FC and Kenya's national team, Harambee Stars as a striker.

Prior to joining Shabana, Odongo featured in the inaugural Talanta Hela U-19 tournament where he emerged both with the golden boot and MVP awards while turning out for Vihiga County. He made it to the All-Star team that toured Spain in March 2024 where he emerged the top scorer in a local tournament. In September 2025 he was back in Spain after joining the All-Star team from another local tournament Chapa Dimba for a trip to Huesca.

Odongo was part of Kenya's team that featured in the 2024 African Nations Championship held across East Africa in August 2025.
