= Pascal Msindo =

Tanzanian footballer (born 2000)

Personal information
- Full name: Pascal Gaudence Msindo
- Date of birth: 27 October 2000 (age 26)
- Place of birth: Morogoro, Tanzania
- Height: 1.76 m (5 ft 9 in)
- Position: Left-back

Team information
- Current team: Azam
- Number: 12

Senior career*
Years	Team	Apps	(Gls)
2020–2021	African Sports		
2021–	Azam		

International career^{‡}
2019	Tanzania U17	3	(0)
2021	Tanzania U20	3	(0)
2024–	Tanzania	17	(0)
- * Club domestic league appearances and goals as of 23:55, 21 December 2025 (UTC) ‡ National team caps and goals as of 23:55, 21 December 2025 (UTC)

Pascal Gaudence Msindo (born 27 October 2000) is a Tanzanian professional footballer who plays as a left-back for Tanzanian Premier League club Azam and the Tanzania national team.

== Club career ==
A youth product of African Sports, Msindo moved to Azam in the Tanzanian Premier League on 17 April 2021. On 3 April 2024, he extended his contract with Azam until 2027.

== International career ==
Msindo made the senior Tanzania national team for the 2025 Africa Cup of Nations.
