= Nicholas Mwere =

Ugandan footballer

Personal information
- Full name: Nicholas Mwere
- Date of birth: March 13, 2001 (age 25)
- Height: 1.79 m (5 ft 10 in)
- Position: Defender

Team information
- Current team: (Uganda) BUL FC

Youth career
- JIPRA
- Kakira Town Council

Senior career*
Years	Team	Apps	(Gls)
2021–2023	Busoga United FC		
2023–Present	BUL FC	22	(1)

International career^{‡}
2022	Sand Cranes		(4)
- * Club domestic league appearances and goals as of 25 August 2025 ‡ National team caps and goals as of 25 August 2025

Nicholas Mwere (born 13 March 2001) is a Ugandan professional footballer who plays as a defender for BUL FC in the Uganda Premier League and the Uganda national football team. He has also represented Uganda in beach soccer with the national team, the Sand Cranes.

== Early life ==
Mwere was born in Kampala, Uganda. He began his football career at JIPRA before joining Kakira Town Council in Jinja District.

== Club career ==
=== Busoga United FC ===
Mwere joined Busoga United in 2021, making his debut in the Uganda Premier League.

=== BUL FC ===
In 2023, Mwere signed a three-year contract with BUL FC. He made 22 league appearances for the club in the 2024–25 season, scored one goal and provided two assists.

Mwere was also named in the team of Uganda Premier League first around in 2023–24 season.

== International career ==
=== Beach soccer ===
Mwere has represented Uganda in beach soccer. In the 2022 Africa Beach Soccer Cup of Nations qualifiers, he scored four goals, including a hat-trick against Comoros, to secure Uganda's qualification.

== Style of play ==
Mwere is known for his physical presence, aerial ability, and versatility, contributing both defensively and in attack from the left flank.

== Career statistics ==
Club

Season	Club	League	Apps	Goals
2024–25	BUL FC	Uganda Premier League	22	1

== Honours ==
- BUL FC
  - Uganda Cup: 2022–23 (squad member)
- Jinja Lions
  - Top scorer in the FUFA Beach Soccer League 2022–23 season with 36 goals.
