= Abdul Karim Watambala =

Ugandan professional footballer

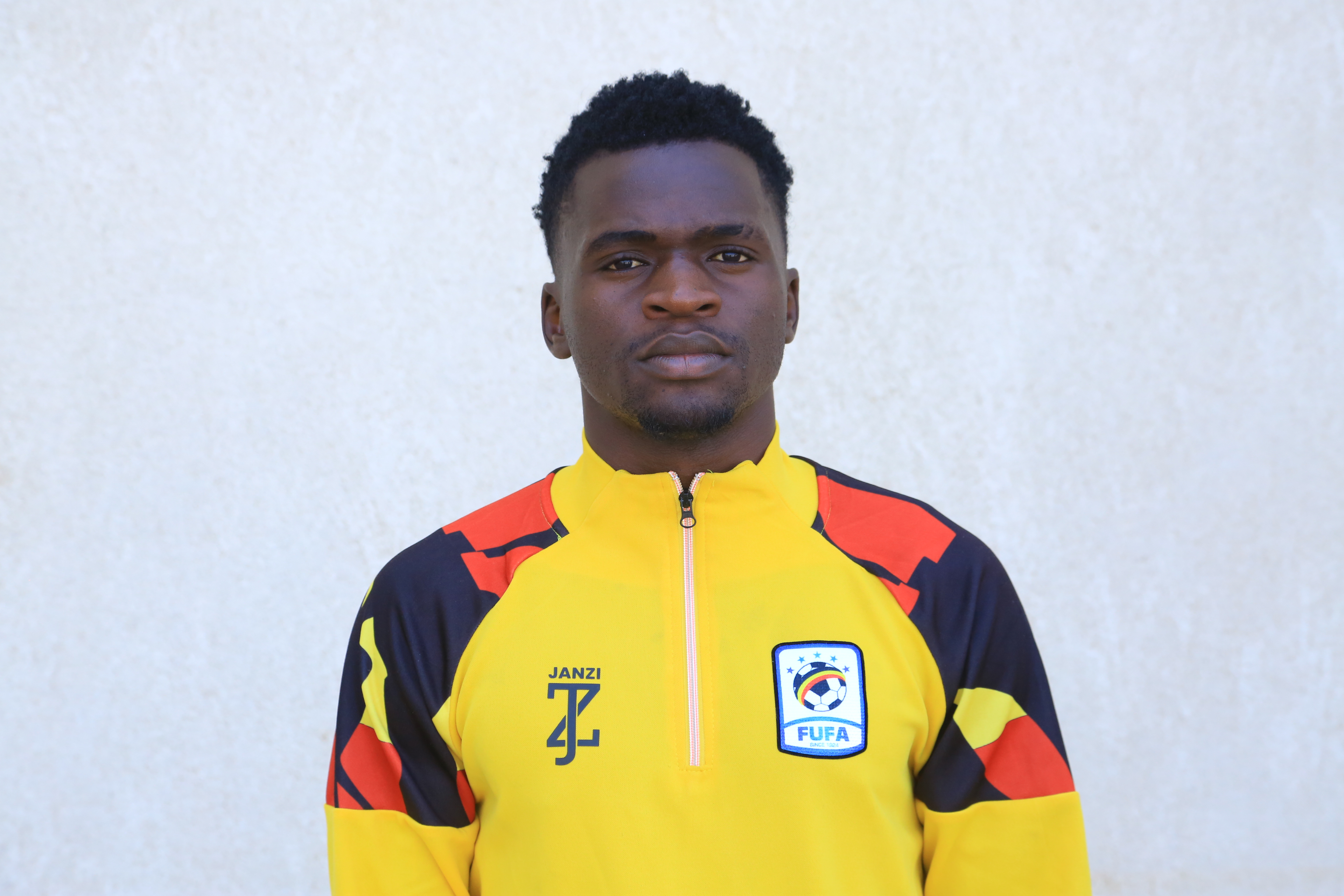

Personal information
- Full name: Abdul Karim Watambala
- Date of birth: March 3, 2000 (age 26)
- Place of birth: Uganda
- Position: Midfielder

Team information
- Current team: Vipers SC

Youth career
- 2019: St. Mary's SS Kitende

Senior career*
Years	Team	Apps	(Gls)
2019–	Vipers SC	72	(7)

International career^{‡}
2019–	Uganda	23	(0)
- * Club domestic league appearances and goals as of 15 August 2025 ‡ National team caps and goals as of 16 June 2026

Abdul Karim Watambala (born 3 March 2000) is a Ugandan professional footballer who plays as a midfielder for Vipers SC in the Uganda Premier League.

== Club career ==
=== Vipers SC ===
Watambala was promoted from St. Mary’s SS Kitende to the Vipers SC senior team in the 2019-2020 season. He quickly made an impact helping the team to the Uganda Premier League title in his first season.

In July 2023, Watambala signed a new two year contract extension with Vipers SC, keeping him at the club through 2025. He has appeared in 72 league matches, scoring 7 goals, including a crucial late equalizer against BUL FC that helped them secure the title in the 2023-2024 season.

== International career ==
Watambala received his first national team call during the 2020 African Nations Championship qualifiers, after impressing in his debut season with Vipers SC.

On November 13, 2020, he made his senior Uganda national football team debut in an Africa Cup of Nations qualifier against South Sudan, entering as a substitute in a 1-0 victory.

== Honors ==
=== Vipers SC ===
- Uganda Premier League: 2019-2020, 2021-2022, 2022-2023, 2023-2024
- Uganda Cup: 2019-2020, 2022-2023, 2024-2025

== See also ==
- Allan Okello
- Reagan Mpande
