= Denis Kiggundu =

Ugandan footballer (born 2000)

Personal information
- Full name: Denis Kiggundu
- Date of birth: May 15, 2000 (age 26)
- Height: 1.74 m (5 ft 9 in)
- Position: Goalkeeper

Team information
- Current team: Vipers SC
- Number: 20

Senior career*
Years	Team	Apps	(Gls)
2019–Present	Vipers SC		

International career
2022–Present	Uganda Cranes		
- * Club domestic league appearances and goals

Denis Kiggundu (born 15 May 2000) is a Ugandan professional footballer who plays as a goalkeeper for Vipers SC in the Uganda Premier League and the Uganda national football team.

== Club career ==
Kiggundu joined Vipers SC in 2019 and has since been part of the first-team squad, competing in the Uganda Premier League, the Uganda Cup and the CAF Champions League.

In the 2024–25 season, he featured in 15 matches, conceding nine goals in 1,350 minutes of play, averaging 0.53 goals against per match. He also kept clean sheets in the 2024–25 Uganda Cup, where Vipers won the title.

He was part of the squad that travelled for CAF Champions League fixtures, including the 2023 preliminary tie against Jwaneng Galaxy.

== International career ==
In September 2022, Kiggundu was named in the Uganda Cranes squad for international friendlies in Libya, although he did not feature in the matches.

He was again selected in July 2025 for the squad to compete at the 2024 African Nations Championship (CHAN).

== Honours ==
=== Club ===
- Uganda Premier League: 2024–25
- Uganda Cup: 2024–25

=== Individual ===
- Stanbic Uganda Cup Best Goalkeeper: 2024–25

== Career statistics ==
As of 2025-09-05

=== Club ===
Season	Club	League	Apps	Goals
2019–20	Vipers SC	Uganda Premier League	—	0
2020–21	Vipers SC	Uganda Premier League	—	0
2021–22	Vipers SC	Uganda Premier League	—	0
2022–23	Vipers SC	Uganda Premier League	—	0
2023–24	Vipers SC	Uganda Premier League	—	0
2024–25	Vipers SC	Uganda Premier League	15	0
