= Ismail Watenga =

Ugandan footballer (born 1995)

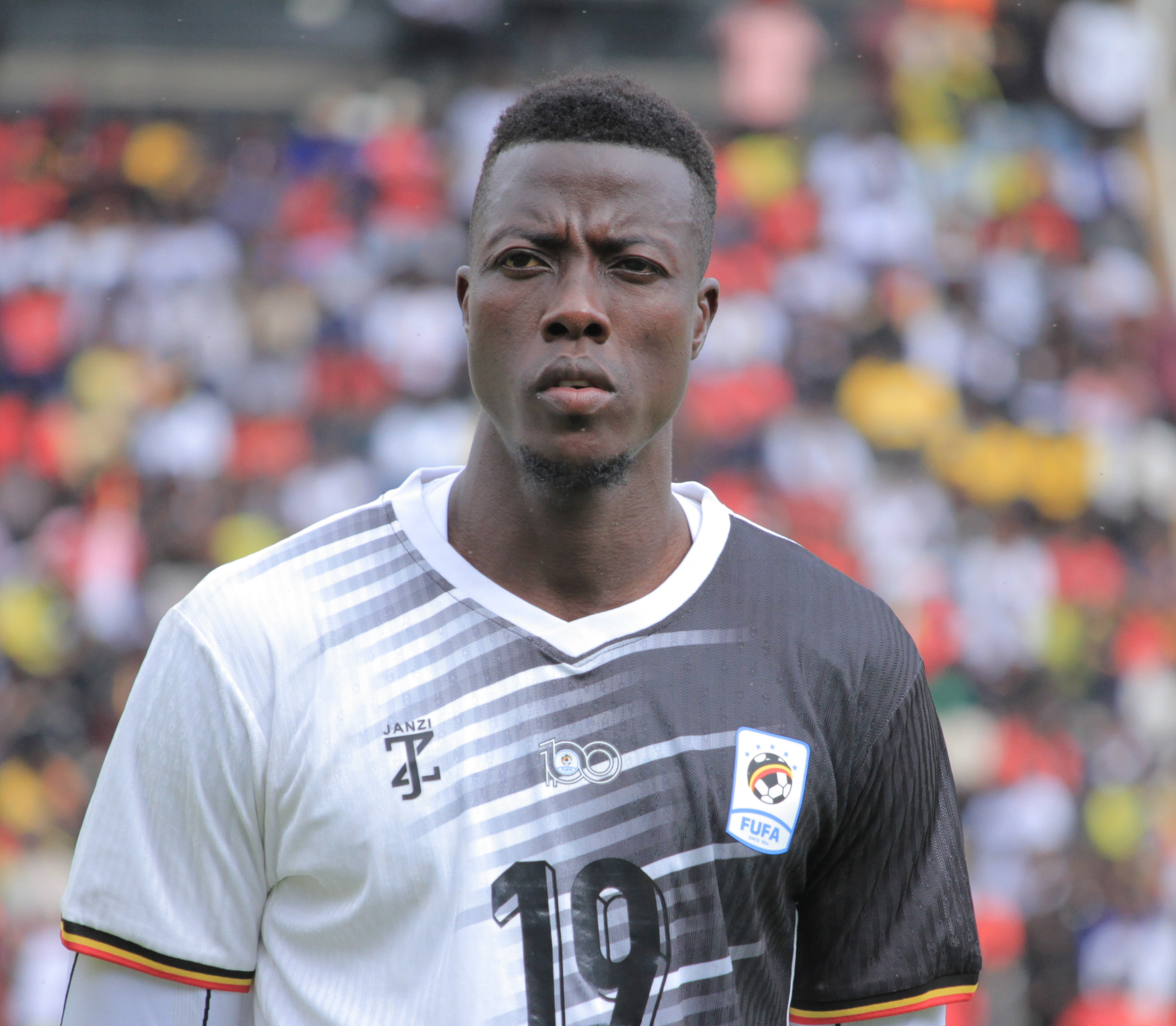
- Ismail Watenga at Uganda vs South Africa 2025

Personal information
- Full name: Ismail Bin Abdul Rashid Watenga
- Date of birth: 15 May 1995 (age 31)
- Place of birth: Mbale, Uganda
- Height: 1.83 m (6 ft 0 in)
- Position: Goalkeeper

Team information
- Current team: Mamelodi Sundowns
- Number: 19

Senior career*
Years	Team	Apps	(Gls)
2011–2018	Vipers		
2018–2019	Ethiopian Coffee		
2019–2020	Sofapaka		
2020–2022	Chippa United	19	(0)
2022–	Mamelodi Sundowns	0	(0)
2022	→ Marumo Gallants (loan)	4	(0)
2023–2025	→ Golden Arrows (loan)	19	(0)

International career^{‡}
2014–	Uganda	19	(0)
- * Club domestic league appearances and goals as of 14 July 2026 ‡ National team caps and goals as of 27 March 2018

Ismail Watenga (born 15 May 1995) is a Ugandan professional footballer who plays as a goalkeeper for Mamelodi Sundowns and the Uganda national team

== Early life and education ==
Watenga was born in Nakaloke, Mbale to Muduwa Zaituni and Bwayo Daniel, he is the youngest of three brothers and two sisters. He began his education at Namunsi Primary School before joining Nakaloke Islamic SS for his first year of secondary school (S.1). He later transferred to Manafwa High School in Mbale and then to Busolwe SS. However, due to the school's lack of a UNEB center number, he moved to Tororo Progressive Academy (TOPA), where he completed his Uganda Certificate of Education (UCE). For his A-Level education, he attended St. Mary's secondary school, Kitende, where he completed his Uganda Advanced Certificate of Education (UACE). He later enrolled at Kampala International University (KIU) but chose to leave early to focus on his football career.

== Playing career ==
Watenga began his football journey at the age of six with Kamu Kamu FC, later joining Jami FC in Kamonkoli. While attending Manafwa High School, he played for the school’s football team. In 2011, he started his senior club career with Vipers SC, where he played until 2018, winning the Uganda Super League titles in 2015 and 2018. He then moved to Ethiopian Coffee SC on a two year contract, before having a brief stint with Sofapaka F.C. in the Kenyan Premier League in 2019. In 2020, Watenga signed with Chippa United F.C in South Africa. He later joined Mamelodi Sundowns F.C in 2022 but was loaned to Marumo Gallants for the season. In 2023, he was loaned to Golden Arrows, before securing a permanent move to the club in August 2023.

== International career ==
Watenga made his debut for the Uganda national team during the 2013 CECAFA Championship in Kenya. In January 2014, coach Milutin Sredojević, invited him to be included in the Uganda national football team for the 2014 African Nations Championship. The team placed third in the group stage of the competition after beating Burkina Faso, drawing with Zimbabwe, and losing to Morocco.

== Philanthropy ==
In 2024 Watenga established a foundation in Nakaloke dedicated to nurturing young, promising athletes. Through this initiative, he has provided football scholarships to children, giving them the opportunity to develop their talents and pursue their passion for the sport.

== Career statistics ==
Appearances and goals by national team and year
National team	Year	Apps	Goals
Uganda	2014	2	0
Uganda	2015	3	0
Uganda	2016	1	0
Uganda	2017	5	0
Uganda	2018	2	0
Uganda	2019	0	0
Uganda	2020	0	0
Uganda	2021	3	0
Uganda	2022	1	1
Uganda	2023	1	0
Uganda	2024	8	0
Total		26	1
