= KCCA Soccer Academy =

Football development team in Uganda

- Full name: Kampala Capital City Authority Soccer Academy
- Nickname: The Junior Kasasiro Boys
- Founded: 2024
- Ground: MTN Omondi Stadium, Lugogo, Kampala
- Capacity: 10,000
- Owner: Kampala Capital City Authority FC
- Chairman: KCCA Football Club Board
- Manager: Various Academy Coaches
- League: FUFA Juniors League
- Website: KCCA FC official website

KCCA Soccer Academy is the official youth development program of Kampala Capital City Authority FC in Uganda. The academy identifies, trains, and nurtures young players to create a pathway into professional football. It competes in the FUFA Juniors League and organizes grassroots programs for boys and girls aged 3–17.

== History ==
The academy was established in 2024 as part of KCCA FC’s long-term strategy to groom talent for the senior team. It quickly became the feeder system for KCCA FC, offering structured coaching, competitions, and educational partnerships.

== Programs ==
The academy runs:

- Holiday and weekend training clinics for ages 3–17.
- Annual tournaments and inter-academy galas at MTN Omondi Stadium.
- International competitions, such as the Iteen International Tournament in Kigali, Rwanda (2024).

== Competitive record ==
KCCA Soccer Academy plays in the FUFA Juniors League, Uganda’s official U17/U18 championship.

- Finalists in 2015, 2017, and 2019.
- Produced award-winning talents such as Ivan Asaba (2017 MVP) and Sadat Anaku (2017 top scorer, 27 goals).
- In the 2025 season, defeated Maroons Junior Team 2–0 with goals from Raphael Masudi and Ismail Fahad.

== Player development ==
Several academy graduates have progressed to KCCA FC’s senior team and beyond, including:

- Allan Okello
- Mustafa Kizza
- Julius Poloto
- Steven Sserwadda

In July 2023, academy graduates Alex Yiga, Abubakar Mayanja, and Anthony Emojong were promoted to the senior squad on five-year contracts.

== Partnerships ==
In 2024, the academy signed an MoU with Kyadondo Secondary School to integrate football training with education and scholarship programs.

== See also ==
- Kampala Capital City Authority FC
- FUFA Juniors League
