= National Enterprises Corporation FC =

Association football club in Uganda

NEC
- Full name: National Enterprise Corporation FC
- Founded: 2017
- Ground: MTN Omondi Stadium, Lugogo
- Capacity: 10,000
- Chairman: Bridon Kimbowa
- Coach: Bradley Ssewankambo
- League: Uganda Premier League
- Website: https://necfcuganda.com

National Enterprise Corporation FC is also called NEC FC, is a Ugandan football club founded 2017 in Bugolobi, Kampala. It plays in the Uganda Premier League.

Full name	NEC FC
Founded	2017
Ground	MTN Phillip Omondi Stadium
Capacity	10,000
President	Lt. Gen. James Mugira
Manager	Kaddu Badru Mukasa
League	Uganda Premier League
Website	https://necfcuganda.com/

== History ==
NEC FC was founded in 2017 and it was promoted to FUFA 5th Division League in 2018 under the Nakawa Football Association.

In 2019, NEC FC was promoted to Kampala Regional League from the 4th Division and later promoted to FUFA Big League in 2022 where it emerged in the third position on the League table thus gaining promotion to the Uganda Premier League.

NEC FC was promoted to the Uganda Premier League 2023/24 season for their first time after finishing in the third position on the table in the FUFA Big League with 57 points in the 30 games played, Julius Walugembe scored 2 goals alongside Marvin Kavuma and Tonny Kiberu who scored one goal each making 4 total goal that contributed to their win and promotion.

Club Profile

As of February 2026.

- Chairman - Brian Buhanda
- Chief Executive Officer - Jonathan Okorotum
- Captain - Marvin Kavuma
- Head coach- Kaddu Badru Mukasa
- Home ground -Philip Omondi stadium.

== Stadium ==
NEC FC used Coffee grounds in Bugolobi as their hosting play ground during the FUFA Big League 2022/23 season. And on promotion to the Uganda Premier League, NEC FC uses MTN Omondi Stadium as their home play-ground.

== Squad ==
Some of the payers as of February 2026

NEC FC Players
6	DF	Ibrahim Kiyemba
17	DF	Gideon Odongo
20	DF	Dhata Joseph Stephen Lujang
13	MF	Shamiru Kimwero
15	MF	Joseph Seremba
19	GK	Hannington Sebwalunyo
3	DF	Warren Buule
16	DF	Ibrahim Musa
29	FW	Ronald Media Innocent
5	MF	Daniel Shabene
10	MF	Allan Mugalu
8	MF	Marvin Kavuma
14	FW	Paul Mucureezi
28	MF	Emmanuel Kulanga
23	DF	Patrick Bayiga
1	GK	Samson Kiirya
27	FW	James Jarieko
7	FW	Emmanuel Ajo
30	FW	Hudson Mbalire
18	MF	Muzamiru Mutyaba
26	MF	Jackson Ssembatya

== Records ==
=== Competitions ===
NEC FC qualified in the 2022–23 Stanbic Uganda Cup Round of 64 where they played Pajule Lions at their home ground in Pader and lost 1–0 to the host.

== See also ==
1. List of football clubs in Uganda
2. Uganda Premier League
3. Mbarara City FC
4. Express FC
