= Vipers SC =

Association football club in Uganda

Vipers
- Full name: Vipers Sports Club
- Founded: 1969; 57 years ago (as Bunamwaya FC)
- Ground: St Mary's Stadium-Kitende
- Capacity: 15,000
- President: Lawrence Mulindwa
- Manager: Denis Lavagne
- League: Uganda Premier League
- 2025–26: Uganda Premier League, Champions of 16
- Website: https://viperssc.co.ug/

Vipers Sports Club is a Ugandan professional association football club based in Kitende, Wakiso District. It competes in the Uganda Premier League, the top flight of Ugandan football. The club was founded in 1969 as Bunamwaya FC. They are nicknamed "The Venoms."

== History ==
The club was founded as Bunamwaya FC in 1969.

Since 2006, after the team was promoted from the Regional Leagues (2nd division at the time), Vipers SC have played in the Uganda Premier League. They have finished in the table's top half on every single season ever since being promoted to the Premier League.

With the backing of president Lawrence Mulindwa, the club signed several important players for the 2010 season, including seven members of the Ugandan National Team at the time. In this season, Bunamwaya won their first ever Premier League title with two rounds to spare. They did not participate in the 2011 CAF Champions League for financial reasons.

Bunamwaya were unable to replicate their success in a short succeeding period, finishing third in 2011 and finishing as runners-up in both Cup and League on 2012.

On 21 August 2012, Bunamwaya was renamed to Vipers SC in order to "elevate the status of the club" and to "make them more nationally relevant".

Vipers lost the 2013 Uganda Cup final in heartbreaking fashion. After taking the lead in the 78th minute with a penalty scored by Joseph Mprade, the Victoria University scored a goal in the final seconds of the match and then went on to win the penalty shootouts by 5–3.

League success finally came again in the 2014–15 season after a nearly unbeaten league campaign, which saw Vipers only falls out to a defeat on a single match. They were led by Edward Golola. The club had close ties with St. Mary's School,Kitende, with 17 players of the 2015 title-winning squad hailing from the school.

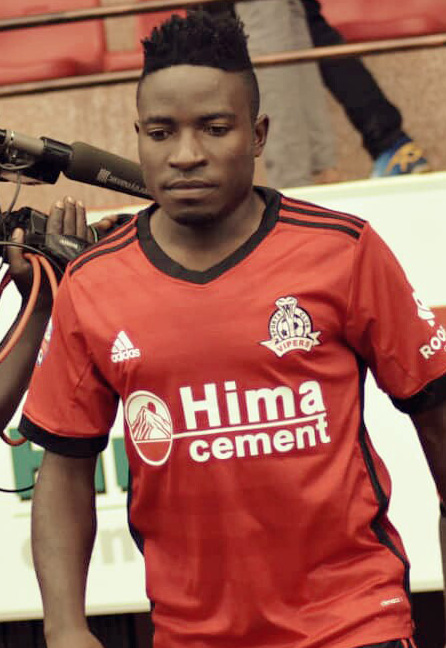
Vipers SC midfielder Seninde Ezekiel Duncan during Uganda Premier League match in May 2018

The league title led Vipers to try out on continental competition for the first time. In the 2016 CAF Champions League, they played and lost their first ever continental match by 1–2 on aggregate to Nigerian club Enyimba FC in the preliminary round.

Vipers finished as runners up in the 2015–16 season, but saw their first ever success in the Uganda Cup, beating Onduparaka FC by 3–1 in the final. The win qualified them for the 2017 CAF Confederation Cup. In the preliminary round, they played against Volcan Club from Comoros, and ended barely winning the match on the away-goal rule after drawing 1–1 on aggregate. On the first round, they fell short to Platinum Stars of South Africa in the first round, having lost by 3–2 on aggregate. This loss came after conceding a 90th-minute penalty in the last moment of the tie.

The Vipers participated in the 2018–19 CAF Champions League qualifying rounds. They played and won the preliminary round by the away-goal rule, after tying 1–1 with Al-Merrikh SC from Sudan. In the first round, they fell one match shy to the group stage against CS Constantine of Algeria, after a 0–3 defeat on aggregate.

In May 2020, Vipers was declared champions of the 2019–20 Uganda Premier League while leading the table with 54 points after 25 matches. This league title was their fourth in their history. The league title was awarded before its completion as it was cancelled mid-season by the FUFA due to the COVID-19 outbreak.

At the 2021–22 season, with four remaining matches, Vipers won another league title after a 3–0 win against Express FC, leading the team to qualify to the qualifying rounds of the 2022–23 CAF Champions League.

On the preliminary round of the competition, they were able to win their tie with relative ease, winning both matches played against Olympic Real de Bangui from Central African Republic. On the first round, they were paired against TP Mazembe from DR Congo. After tying both matches by 0–0, penalty shoot-outs were required. Vipers ended up winning the shoot-out by 4–2, qualifying them to the group stage of a CAF Champions League for the first time ever.

On the 2022–23 CAF Champions League group stage, the club was paired to the Group C alongside Raja CA (Morocco), Simba (Tanzania) and Horoya (Guinea).

On May 24, 2025, Vipers SC were officially crowned as Champions of the 2024/25 Uganda Premier League as the season came to a climax.

The Venoms emerged Champions after a remarkable season where they outshone the rest of the teams.

The crowning ceremony came immediately after their final game of the season against Soltilo Bright Stars FC which ended in a one-all draw.

Vipers SC ended the season with 69 points, two ahead of NEC FC who edged URA FC 1-0 in Lugogo.

After defending their title, it was on Sunday the 7th June 2026 that Vipers left the entire Uganda football a washed by letting their head coach Ivan Minnaert, the Belgian go after his contract term expiry. He joined Vipers on 18th July 2025 from Liberian Premier League enquip Fassell Football Club.

On 13th September 2026, Vipers began their journey as the only representatives for Uganda at the CAF Champions League 2026 against Mauritania's FC Nouadhibou in the first preliminary round where they got eliminated.

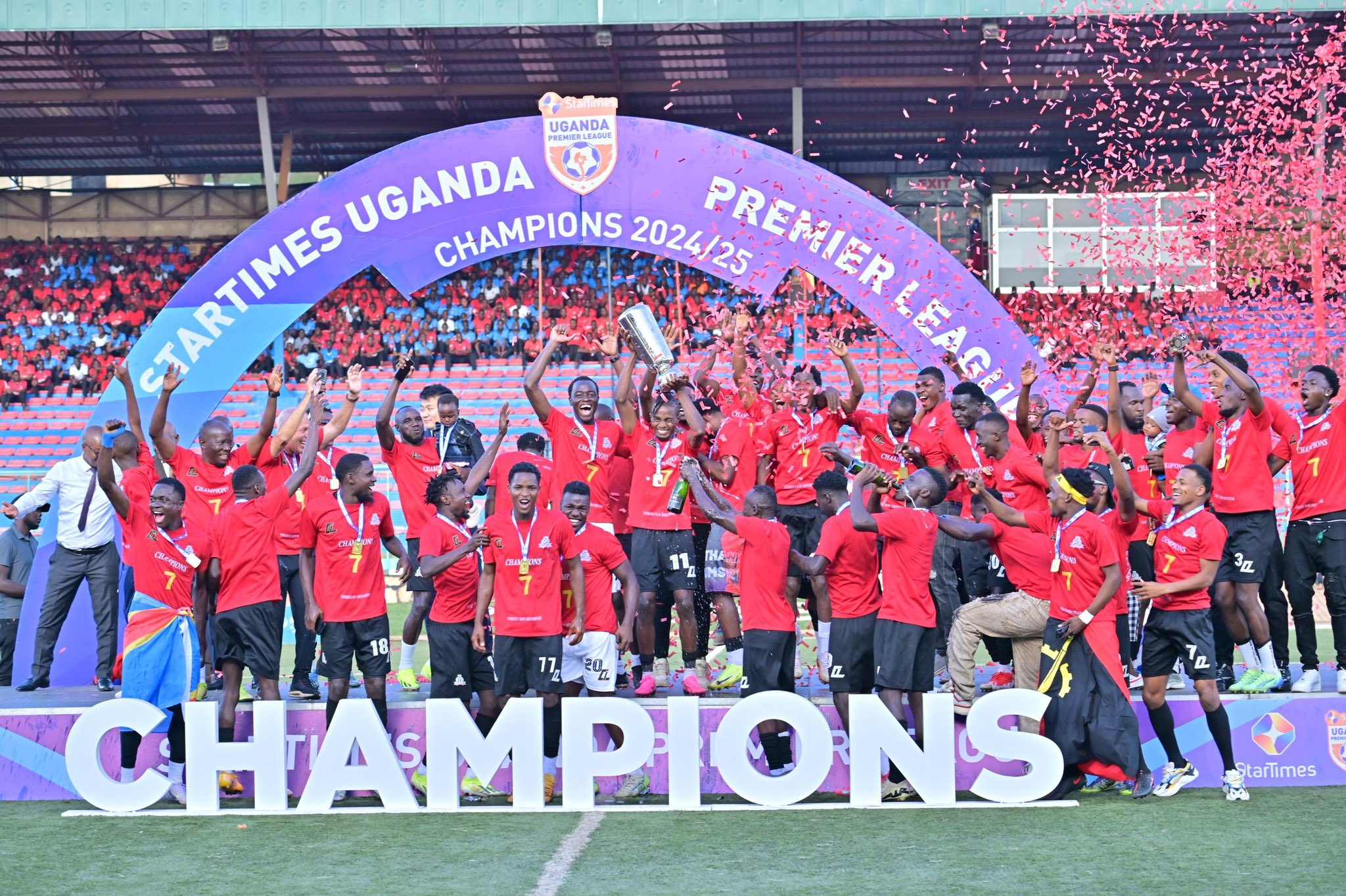
Vipers SC players celebrate after winning the 2024–25 Uganda Premier League

=== Stadium ===
They play at St. Mary's Stadium-Kitende, which has a capacity of 25,000 with more than 1,000 VIP seats. The stadium was completely refurbished in 2018 and includes artificial turf.

On 3 March 2017, the African football governing body, CAF, cleared the then newly constructed St Mary's Stadium to host football games. St. Mary's stadium is the home of SC Vipers, located in Kitende on Entebbe road and was built by the club patron and former FUFA president, Doctor Lawrence Mulindwa.

== Achievements ==
- Ugandan Premier League
  - Champions (8): 2009–10, 2014–15, 2017–18, 2019–20, 2021–22, 2022–23, 2024–25, 2025–26
- Ugandan Cup
  - Winners (4): 2015–16, 2019–20, 2022–23, 2024–25
- Ugandan Super Cup
  - Winners (1): 2015
- Pilsner Super Cup
  - Winners (1): 2019

== Current Team ==
Note: Flags indicate national team as defined under FIFA eligibility rules; some limited exceptions apply. Players may hold more than one non-FIFA nationality.

No.	Pos.	Nation	Player
1	GK	COD	Alfred Mudekereza
2	DF	UGA	Grant Matsiko
3	DF	UGA	Derrick Ndahiro
4	DF	UGA	Livingstone Mulondo
5	DF	COD	Kevin Bady
6	MF	UGA	Taddeo Lwanga
7	FW	NGR	Odili Chukwuma
8	MF	UGA	Enock Ssebaggala
11	FW	UGA	Milton Karisa
12	FW	UGA	Yunus Sentamu
13	MF	UGA	Frank Katongole
14	DF	UGA	Nicholas Wadada
15	DF	UGA	Enock Luyima
16	DF	UGA	Hilary Mukundane
17	FW	UGA	Isaac Ogwang

No.	Pos.	Nation	Player
18	DF	UGA	Paul Mbowa
19	GK	UGA	Jack Komakech
20	DF	UGA	Denis Kiggundu
21	FW	COD	Gusto Mulongo
22	MF	UGA	Marvin Youngman
25	MF	UGA	Abdul Watambala
26	FW	LBR	Mark Yallah
27	MF	UGA	Arafati Usama
28	GK	UGA	Bashir Ssekagya
29	FW	UGA	Annest Ankunda
31	DF	UGA	Ashraf Mandela
33	MF	LBR	Robin Hney
35	FW	COD	Beyuku Glodi
77	MF	UGA	Abubakali Walusimbi

== Current Technical team ==
As of 5 January 2025.

Head Coach	Denis Lavagne
Assistant coach	John Luyinda (Ayala)
Fitness coach	Male Daniel
Goalkeeper Trainer	Ali Kimera
Team doctor	Lule Micheal
Team doctor	Kyeyune Alouzious
Video Analyst	Kenneth Kelvin
Physical trainer	Kato Ibrahim
Sporting Director	Charles Masembe
Kits Manager	Edward Ssentongo

== Former managers ==
- (Brazil) Léo Neiva
- (Brazil) Robertinho Oliveira
- (Portugal) Cardoso de Carmo
- (Belgium) Ivan Minnaert
