= 2024 African Nations Championship =

7th edition of football tournament

Tournament details
- Host countries: Kenya; Tanzania; Uganda
- Dates: 2–30 August 2025
- Teams: 19 (from 1 confederation)
- Venues: 5 (in 4 host cities)

Final positions
- Champions: Morocco (3rd title)
- Runners-up: Madagascar
- Third place: Senegal
- Fourth place: Sudan

Tournament statistics
- Matches played: 44
- Goals scored: 90 (2.05 per match)
- Top scorer: (Morocco) Oussama Lamlioui; (6 goals)
- Best player: (Morocco) Mohamed Hrimat
- Best goalkeeper: (Senegal) Marc Diouf
- Fair play award: Senegal

The 2024 African Nations Championship, known as the 2024 CHAN for short and the TotalEnergies African Nations Championship for sponsorship purposes, was the eighth and final edition of the African Nations Championship, a biennial association football tournament organized by the Confederation of African Football (CAF), featuring national teams consisting of players currently playing in their respective local leagues. It was to be hosted by Kenya, Tanzania, and Uganda from 1 to 28 February 2025, however on 14 January 2025 it was postponed to August 2025 in the same three countries. This was the first edition to be hosted by three countries.

Morocco beat Madagascar 3–2 in the final, claiming their third CHAN title in six years. This also made them the most successful team in the history of the tournament, one better than DR Congo's two titles.

Four months after the end of the tournament on 20 December 2025 the Confederation of African Football announced the cancellation of the competition, to be replaced by the African Nations League in 2029.

== Host selection ==
Kenya, Tanzania, and Uganda were named as co-hosts of the 2024 edition on 17 December 2023 as a dress rehearsal of the 2027 Africa Cup of Nations.

== Postponement ==
On 14 January 2025, the day before the Final Draw took place, CAF announced that the tournament would be postponed to August 2025 to allow more time for preparations and for another qualifying round to take place to decide the final two participants. The preparation of Kenyan venues to host the tournament was considered as "miles behind" by the officials.

== Venues ==
This edition of the tournament was confirmed to be held in five venues in four cities spread across three co-hosting nations: Kenya: Nairobi, Tanzania: Dar es Salaam and Zanzibar City, and Uganda: Kampala.

Uganda
2024 African Nations Championship is located in Uganda	Kampala	
2024 African Nations Championship is located in Uganda	Mandela National Stadium	
2024 African Nations Championship is located in Uganda	Capacity: 45,000	
2024 African Nations Championship is located in Uganda	Mandela National Stadium Uganda	
Kenya
2024 African Nations Championship is located in Kenya	Nairobi	
2024 African Nations Championship is located in Kenya	Moi International Sports Centre	Nyayo National Stadium
2024 African Nations Championship is located in Kenya	Capacity: 55,000	Capacity: 18,000
Tanzania
2024 African Nations Championship is located in Tanzania	Dar es Salaam	Zanzibar City
2024 African Nations Championship is located in Tanzania	Benjamin Mkapa National Stadium	Amaan Stadium
2024 African Nations Championship is located in Tanzania	Capacity: 60,000	Capacity: 15,000

== Qualification ==
The qualification procedures were unveiled at the CAF headquarters in Cairo, Egypt on 9 September 2024 with the qualification itself running from 25 October to 29 December 2024. Libya, Morocco and Tunisia qualified for the final tournament automatically. However, Libya subsequently announced its withdrawal citing a scheduling conflict.

=== Qualified teams ===
Teams in bold qualified after winning in the second qualifying stage.

Team	Zone	Date of qualification	Appearance	First appearance	Last appearance	Previous best performance
Morocco	Northern Zone	9 October 2024	5th	2014	2020	**Champions** (2018, 2020)
**Algeria**	Northern Zone	9 May 2025	3rd	2011	2022	Runners-up (2022)
Guinea	Western Zone A	28 December 2024	4th	2016	2020	3rd Place (2020)
Senegal	Western Zone A	28 December 2024	4th	2009	2022	**Champions** (2022)
Mauritania	Western Zone A	29 December 2024	4th	2014	2022	Quarter-finals (2022)
Niger	Western Zone B	27 December 2024	5th	2011	2022	4th Place (2022)
Burkina Faso	Western Zone B	28 December 2024	4th	2014	2020	Group Stage (2014, 2018, 2020)
Nigeria	Western Zone B	28 December 2024	4th	2014	2018	Runners-up (2018)
Central African Republic	Central Zone	28 December 2024	1st	None	None	Debut
DR Congo	Central Zone	28 December 2024	7th	2009	2022	**Champions** (2009, 2016)
~~Equatorial Guinea~~	Central Zone	~~25 January 2025~~	~~2nd~~	~~2018~~	~~2018~~	~~Group Stage (2018)~~
Congo	Central Zone	17 June 2025 (Note: The Republic of the Congo initially qualified for the tournament on 29 December 2024. However, the Confederation of African Football subsequently disqualified the team and allocated their place to Equatorial Guinea. In response, the Congolese Football Federation lodged a formal appeal against the ruling. Upon review, the CAF Appeals Jury overturned the original decision, thereby reinstating Congo to the tournament.)	5th	2014	2022	Quarter-finals (2018, 2022)
Kenya (co-hosts)	Central Eastern Zone	26 September 2024	1st	None	None	Debut
Tanzania (co-hosts)	Central Eastern Zone	26 September 2024	3rd	2009	2020	Group stage (2009, 2020)
Uganda (co-hosts)	Central Eastern Zone	26 September 2024	7th	2011	2022	Group stage (2011, 2014, 2016, 2018, 2020, 2022)
Sudan	Central Eastern Zone	28 December 2024	4th	2011	2022	3rd Place (2011, 2018)
Zambia	Southern Zone	15 December 2024	5th	2009	2020	3rd Place (2009)
Angola	Southern Zone	28 December 2024	5th	2011	2022	Runners-up (2011)
Madagascar	Southern Zone	29 December 2024	2nd	2022	2022	3rd Place (2022)
**South Africa**	Southern Zone	11 May 2025	3rd	2011	2014	Quarter-finals (2011)

== Draw ==
The draw was held on 15 January 2025 at the Kenyatta International Conventional Centre in Nairobi.

On the morning of the draw, CAF announced the draw pots and procedure, however no formula for the seeding system was provided other than that it took into account performances in the last three editions.

Seeded	Pot A	Pot B	Pot C
Kenya (A1 - Host); Tanzania (B1 - Host); Uganda (C1 - Host); Senegal (D1 - Holders)	Morocco; Niger; Equatorial Guinea; Madagascar	Mauritania; Guinea; Sudan; Angola	DR Congo; Zambia; Burkina Faso; Nigeria; Central African Republic; Algeria; South Africa

== Squads ==
Each squad could contain a maximum of 28 players (Regulations Article 72).

== Group stage ==
CAF announced the tournament schedule on 27 June 2025.

The top two teams of each group will advance to the quarter finals.

=== Tiebreakers ===
Teams will be ranked according to the three points for a win system (3 points for a win, 1 for a draw, 0 points for a loss), and if tied on points, the following tiebreaking criteria are applied, in the order given, to determine the rankings:

1. Points in head-to-head matches among tied teams;
2. Goal difference in head-to-head matches among tied teams;
3. Goals scored in head-to-head matches among tied teams;
4. If more than two teams were tied, and after applying all head-to-head criteria above, if two teams are still tied, all head-to-head criteria above are applied exclusively to these two teams;
5. Goal difference in all group matches;
6. Goals scored in all group matches;
7. Drawing of lots.

=== Group A ===
Pos	Team	Pld	W	D	L	GF	GA	GD	Pts	Qualification
1	Kenya (H)	4	3	1	0	4	1	+3	10	Qualification to knockout stage
2	Morocco	4	3	0	1	8	3	+5	9	Qualification to knockout stage
3	DR Congo	4	2	0	2	5	4	+1	6	
4	Angola	4	1	1	2	3	6	−3	4	
5	Zambia	4	0	0	4	2	8	−6	0	

Source: CAF
Rules for classification: Tiebreakers
(H) Hosts
3 August 2025
15:00

Kenya	1–0	DR Congo
A. Odhiambo 45+2'	Report

Moi International Sports Centre, Nairobi
Referee: Jelly Chavani (South Africa)
3 August 2025
18:00

Morocco	2–0	Angola
Riahi 29'; Quinito 81' (o.g.)	Report

Nyayo National Stadium, Nairobi
Referee: Abdou Abdel Mefire (Cameroon)

7 August 2025
16:00

DR Congo	2–0	Zambia
Matobo 51'; Mwaku 71'	Report

Nyayo National Stadium, Nairobi
Referee: Houssam Benyahia (Algeria)
7 August 2025
19:00

Angola	1–1	Kenya
Paciência 7'	Report	A. Odhiambo 12' (pen.)

Moi International Sports Centre, Nairobi
Referee: Sadou Ali Brahamou (Niger)

10 August 2025
15:00

Kenya	1–0	Morocco
Ogam 42'	Report

Moi International Sports Centre, Nairobi
Referee: Vincent Kabore (Ghana)
10 August 2025
18:00

Zambia	1–2	Angola
Chanda 73'	Report	Kaporal 79', 86'

Nyayo National Stadium, Nairobi
Referee: Adissa Abdul Raphiou Ligali (Benin)

14 August 2025
17:00

Morocco	3–1	Zambia
Hrimat 45+2'; Lamlioui 66'; Bougrine 90+5'	Report	Phiri 70'

Nyayo National Stadium, Nairobi
Referee: Adalbert Diouf (Senegal)
14 August 2025
20:00

Angola	0–2	DR Congo
	Report	Kitambala 58'; Katumbwe 70'

Moi International Sports Centre, Nairobi
Referee: Mahmoud Nagy (Egypt)

17 August 2025
15:00

DR Congo	1–3	Morocco
Kitambala 58'	Report	Lamlioui 8', 80'; Hrimat 70' (pen.)

Nyayo National Stadium, Nairobi
Referee: Ousmane Diakate (Mali)
17 August 2025
15:00

Zambia	0–1	Kenya
	Report	Ogam 75'

Moi International Sports Centre, Nairobi
Referee: Lamin Jammeh (The Gambia)

=== Group B ===
Pos	Team	Pld	W	D	L	GF	GA	GD	Pts	Qualification
1	Tanzania (H)	4	3	1	0	5	1	+4	10	Qualification to knockout stage
2	Madagascar	4	2	1	1	5	3	+2	7	Qualification to knockout stage
3	Mauritania	4	2	1	1	2	1	+1	7	
4	Burkina Faso	4	1	0	3	5	7	−2	3	
5	Central African Republic	4	0	1	3	2	7	−5	1	

Source: CAF
Rules for classification: Tiebreakers
(H) Hosts
2 August 2025
20:00

Tanzania	2–0	Burkina Faso
Abdul Sopu 45+3' (pen.); Zimbwe Jr 71'	Report

Benjamin Mkapa Stadium, Dar es Salaam
Referee: Lotfi Bekouassa (Algeria)
3 August 2025
20:00

Madagascar	0–0	Mauritania
	Report

Benjamin Mkapa Stadium, Dar es Salaam
Referee: Shamirah Nabadda (Uganda)

6 August 2025
17:00

Burkina Faso	4–2	Central African Republic
Nasser Ouatarra 11'; Guiro 61' (pen.); Malo 78' (pen.); Baguian 84'	Report	Tchibinda 15'; Zoumara 90+5'

Benjamin Mkapa Stadium, Dar es Salaam
Referee: Bouchra Karboubi (Morocco)
6 August 2025
20:00

Mauritania	0–1	Tanzania
	Report	Kapombe 89'

Benjamin Mkapa Stadium, Dar es Salaam
Referee: Patrice Milazare (Mauritius)

9 August 2025
17:00

Central African Republic	0–1	Mauritania
	Report	El Moctar 9'

Benjamin Mkapa Stadium, Dar es Salaam
Referee: Dickens Nyagrowa (Kenya)
9 August 2025
20:00

Tanzania	2–1	Madagascar
Mzize 13', 20'	Report	Razafimahatana 34'

Benjamin Mkapa Stadium, Dar es Salaam
Referee: Lamin Jammeh (The Gambia)

13 August 2025
17:00

Madagascar	2–0	Central African Republic
Rakotondraibe 84'; Rafanomezantsoa 90+4'	Report

Benjamin Mkapa Stadium, Dar es Salaam
Referee: Mehrez Melki (Tunisia)
13 August 2025
20:00

Mauritania	1–0	Burkina Faso
Alassane Diop 45+9'	Report

Benjamin Mkapa Stadium, Dar es Salaam
Referee: Jelly Chavani (South Africa)

16 August 2025
20:00

Burkina Faso	1–2	Madagascar
Sangaré 25'	Report	Razafimaro 7'; Rafanomezantsoa 58'

Amaan Stadium, Zanzibar City
Referee: Houssam Benyahia (Algeria)
16 August 2025
20:00

Central African Republic	0–0	Tanzania
	Report

Benjamin Mkapa Stadium, Dar es Salaam
Referee: Yannick Malala (DR Congo)

=== Group C ===
Pos	Team	Pld	W	D	L	GF	GA	GD	Pts	Qualification
1	Uganda (H)	4	2	1	1	8	6	+2	7	Qualification to knockout stage
2	Algeria	4	1	3	0	5	2	+3	6	Qualification to knockout stage
3	South Africa	4	1	3	0	6	5	+1	6	
4	Guinea	4	1	1	2	3	6	−3	4	
5	Niger	4	0	2	2	0	3	−3	2	

Source: CAF
Rules for classification: Tiebreakers
(H) Hosts
4 August 2025
17:00

Niger	0–1	Guinea
	Report	Cantona 47'

Mandela National Stadium, Kampala
Referee: Mehrez Melki (Tunisia)
4 August 2025
20:00

Uganda	0–3	Algeria
	Report	Ghezala 36'; Meziane 76'; Bayazid 79'

Mandela National Stadium, Kampala
Referee: Adalbert Diouf (Senegal)

8 August 2025
17:00

Algeria	1–1	South Africa
Belhocini 29'	Report	Kutumela 45'

Mandela National Stadium, Kampala
Referee: Clement Franklin Kpan (Ivory Coast)
8 August 2025
20:00

Guinea	0–3	Uganda
	Report	Mpande 31'; Okello 62' (pen.); Ahimbisibwe 89'

Mandela National Stadium, Kampala
Attendance: 34,175
Referee: Abdulrazg Ahmed (Libya)

11 August 2025
17:00

South Africa	2–1	Guinea
Maema 10'; Kutumela 54'	Report	Moussa Camara 37'

Mandela National Stadium, Kampala
Referee: Kech Chaf Mustapha (Morocco)
11 August 2025
20:00

Uganda	2–0	Niger
Okello 25'; Sserunjogi 56'	Report

Mandela National Stadium, Kampala
Referee: Ousmane Diakate (Mali)

15 August 2025
17:00

Guinea	1–1	Algeria
Camara 62'	Report	Bayazid 88'

Mandela National Stadium, Kampala
Referee: Abdou Abdel Mefire (Cameroon)
15 August 2025
20:00

Niger	0–0	South Africa
	Report

Mandela National Stadium, Kampala
Referee: Bouchra Karboubi (Morocco)

18 August 2025
20:00

Algeria	0–0	Niger
	Report

Nyayo National Stadium, Nairobi (Kenya)
Referee: Ahmed Arajiga (Tanzania)
18 August 2025
20:00

South Africa	3–3	Uganda
Mphahlele 52'; Kutumela 58'; Ndlondlo 83'	Report	Ssemugabi 31'; Okello 88' (pen.); Ochaki 90+6' (pen.)

Mandela National Stadium, Kampala
Referee: Vincent Kabore (Ghana)

=== Group D ===
Pos	Team	Pld	W	D	L	GF	GA	GD	Pts	Qualification
1	Sudan	3	1	2	0	5	1	+4	5	Qualification to knockout stage
2	Senegal	3	1	2	0	2	1	+1	5	Qualification to knockout stage
3	Nigeria	3	1	0	2	2	5	−3	3	
4	Congo	3	0	2	1	2	4	−2	2	

Source: CAF
Rules for classification: Tiebreakers
5 August 2025
17:00

Congo	1–1	Sudan
Ekongo 86'	Report	Kanti 29'

Amaan Stadium, Zanzibar City
Referee: Brighton Chimene (Zimbabwe)
5 August 2025
20:00

Senegal	1–0	Nigeria
Gomis 75'	Report

Amaan Stadium, Zanzibar City
Referee: Mahmoud Nagy (Egypt)

12 August 2025
17:00

Senegal	1–1	Congo
Layousse 82'	Report	Moussavou 19'

Amaan Stadium, Zanzibar City
Referee: Clement Franklin Kpan (Ivory Coast)
12 August 2025
20:00

Sudan	4–0	Nigeria
Ngenge 25' (o.g.); Khidir 44' (pen.); Abdel Raouf 55', 62'	Report

Amaan Stadium, Zanzibar City
Referee: Lotfi Bekouassa (Algeria)

19 August 2025
20:00

Nigeria	2–0	Congo
Yusuf 56'; Alimi 90+3'	Report

Benjamin Mkapa Stadium, Dar es Salaam
Referee: Kech Chaf Mustapha (Morocco)
19 August 2025
20:00

Sudan	0–0	Senegal
	Report

Amaan Stadium, Zanzibar City
Referee: Brighton Chimene (Zimbabwe)

== Knockout stage ==
In the knockout stage, extra time and penalty shoot-out are used to decide the winner if necessary, except for the third place match where penalty shoot-out (no extra time) is used to decide the winner if necessary (Regulations Article 75).

=== Bracket ===
Quarter-finals
August 22 – Nairobi
Kenya	1 (3)
Madagascar (p)	1 (4)
August 23 – Zanzibar City
Sudan (p)	1 (4)
Algeria	1 (2)
August 22 – Dar es Salaam
Tanzania	0
Morocco	1
August 23 – Kampala
Uganda	0
Senegal	1

Semi-finals
August 26 – Dar es Salaam
Madagascar (a.e.t.)	1
Sudan	0
August 26 – Kampala
Morocco (p)	1 (5)
Senegal	1 (3)

Final
August 30 – Nairobi
Madagascar	2
Morocco	3
Third place match
August 29 – Kampala
Sudan	1 (2)
Senegal (p)	1 (4)

=== Quarter-finals ===
22 August 2025
17:00

Kenya	1–1 (a.e.t.)	Madagascar
Omija 48'	Report	Razafimaro 69' (pen.)
Penalties
Mohammed (penalty scored); Sakari (penalty scored); Owino (penalty scored); Kibwage (penalty missed); Omija (penalty missed)	3–4	(penalty scored) Randriamanampisoa; (penalty missed) Randrianirina; (penalty scored) Rafanomezantsoa; (penalty scored) Razafimaro; (penalty scored) Rakotondraibe

Moi International Sports Centre, Nairobi
Referee: Adalbert Diouf (Senegal)

22 August 2025
20:00

Tanzania	0–1	Morocco
	Report	Lamlioui 65'

Benjamin Mkapa Stadium, Dar es Salaam
Referee: Abdou Abdel Mefire (Cameroon)

23 August 2025
17:00

Uganda	0–1	Senegal
	Report	Ba 62'

Mandela National Stadium, Kampala
Referee: Mahmoud Nagy Ahmed Nagy Mosa (Egypt)

23 August 2025
20:00

Sudan	1–1 (a.e.t.)	Algeria
Ghezala 48' (o.g.)	Report	Bayazid 73'
Penalties
Khidir (penalty scored); Ering (penalty scored); Yousif (penalty scored); Boshara (penalty missed); Asad (penalty scored)	4–2	Mahious (penalty scored); Bayazid (penalty scored); Merghem (penalty missed); Draoui (penalty missed)

Amaan Stadium, Zanzibar City
Referee: Clement Franklin Kpan (Ivory Coast)

=== Semi-finals ===
26 August 2025
17:30

Madagascar	1–0 (a.e.t.)	Sudan
Rakotondraibe 116'	Report

Benjamin Mkapa Stadium, Dar es Salaam
Referee: Mehrez Melki (Tunisia)

26 August 2025
20:30

Morocco	1–1 (a.e.t.)	Senegal
Bougrine 23'	Report	Layousse 16'
Penalties
Hrimat (penalty scored); Lamlioui (penalty scored); Khairi (penalty scored); Bach (penalty scored); Mehri (penalty scored)	5–3	Ndiaye (penalty missed); Vieux (penalty scored); Ciss (penalty scored); Ba (penalty scored)

Mandela National Stadium, Kampala
Referee: Jelly Chavani (South Africa)

=== Third place match ===
29 August 2025
18:00

Sudan	1–1	Senegal
Asad 6'	Report	Ndiaye 58'
Penalties
Khidir (penalty missed); Saeed (penalty scored); Makeen (penalty missed); Yousif (penalty scored)	2–4	Layousse (penalty scored); Kane (penalty scored); Vieux (penalty scored); Gueye (penalty scored)

Mandela National Stadium, Kampala
Referee: Shamirah Nabadda (Uganda)

=== Final ===
30 August 2025
18:00

Madagascar	2–3	Morocco
Mantasoa 9'; Rakotondraibe 68'	Report	Mehri 27'; Lamlioui 44', 80'

Moi International Sports Centre, Nairobi
Referee: Abdou Abdel Mefire (Cameroon)

== Goalscorers ==
There have been 90 goals scored in 44 matches, for an average of 2.05 goals per match (as of 30 August 2025).

6 goals

- (Morocco) Oussama Lamlioui

3 goals

- (Algeria) Sofiane Bayazid
- (Madagascar) Toky Rakotondraibe
- (South Africa) Thabiso Kutumela
- (Uganda) Allan Okello

2 goals

- (Kenya) Austin Odhiambo
- (Kenya) Ryan Ogam
- (Madagascar) Lalaina Rafanomezantsoa
- (Madagascar) Fenohasina Razafimaro
- (Morocco) Sabir Bougrine
- (Angola) Kaporal
- (Morocco) Mohamed Rabie Hrimat
- (Sudan) Abdel Raouf
- (Tanzania) Clement Mzize
- (Senegal) Joseph Layousse

1 goal

- (Algeria) Abdennour Belhocini
- (Algeria) Ayoub Ghezala
- (Algeria) Abderrahmane Meziane
- (Angola) Jó Paciência
- (Burkina Faso) Abdoul Baguian
- (Burkina Faso) Abdoul Abass Guiro
- (Burkina Faso) Patrick Malo
- (Burkina Faso) Nasser Ouattara
- (Burkina Faso) Souleymane Sangaré
- (Central African Republic) Sydney Tchibinda
- (Central African Republic) Ange Zoumara
- (Republic of the Congo) Carly Ekongo
- (Republic of the Congo) Dechan Moussavou
- (Democratic Republic of the Congo) Mokonzi Katumbwe
- (Democratic Republic of the Congo) Jephté Kitambala
- (Democratic Republic of the Congo) Ibrahim Matobo
- (Democratic Republic of the Congo) Malanga Horso Mwaku
- (Guinea) Ismael Camara
- (Guinea) Moussa Camara
- (Guinea) Cantona
- (Kenya) Alphonce Omija
- (Madagascar) Félicité Mantasoa
- (Madagascar) Lalaina Rafanomezantsoa
- (Madagascar) Nantenaina Razafimahatana
- (Mauritania) Alassanne Diop
- (Mauritania) Ahmed El Moctar
- (Morocco) Youssef Mehri
- (Morocco) Imad Riahi
- (Nigeria) Anas Yusuf
- (Nigeria) Alimi Sikiru
- (Senegal) Oumar Ba
- (Senegal) Christian Gomis
- (Senegal) Seyni Mbaye Ndiaye
- (South Africa) Neo Maema
- (South Africa) Ramahlwe Mphahlele
- (South Africa) Ndabayithethwa Ndlondlo
- (Sudan) Mohamed Tia Asad
- (Sudan) Musa Hussien
- (Sudan) Walieldin Khidir
- (Tanzania) Shomari Kapombe
- (Tanzania) Abdul Sopu
- (Tanzania) Zimbwe Jr
- (Uganda) Ivan Ahimbisibwe
- (Uganda) Reagan Mpande
- (Uganda) Rogers Ochaki
- (Uganda) Jude Ssemugabi
- (Uganda) Joel Sserunjogi
- (Zambia) Dominic Chanda
- (Zambia) Andrew Phiri

1 own goal

- (Algeria) Ayoub Ghezala (against Sudan)
- (Angola) Quinito (against Morocco)
- (Nigeria) Leonard Ngenge (against Sudan)

== Awards ==
=== Man of the match ===
The Man of the Match award is presented after each game during the tournament. Beyond direct goal contributions, the selection also values attributes such as tactical intelligence, mental composure, and leadership on the pitch.

The eventual winner is selected by CAF's Technical Study Group. The award, presented by TotalEnergies, includes an official trophy handed to the player at the end of the match.

Stage	Team 1	Result	Team 2	Man of the Match
Group stage matches
Group A	Kenya	1–0	DR Congo	(Kenya) Alpha Onyango
Group A	Morocco	2–0	Angola	(Morocco) Mohamed Rabie Hrimat
Group B	Tanzania	2–0	Burkina Faso	(Tanzania) Fei Toto
Group B	Madagascar	0–0	Mauritania	(Madagascar) Michel Ramandimbisoa
Group C	Niger	0–1	Guinea	(Guinea) Lass Bangoura
Group C	Uganda	0–3	Algeria	(Algeria) Abderrahmane Meziane
Group D	Congo	1–1	Sudan	(Sudan) Abdel Raouf
Group D	Senegal	1–0	Nigeria	(Senegal) Libasse Gueye
Group A	DR Congo	2–0	Zambia	(Democratic Republic of the Congo) Ibrahim Matobo
Group A	Angola	1–1	Kenya	(Angola) Gilberto
Group B	Burkina Faso	4–2	Central African Republic	(Burkina Faso) Josaphat Ouattara
Group B	Mauritania	0–1	Tanzania	(Tanzania) Mudathir Yahya
Group C	Algeria	1–1	South Africa	(South Africa) Malibongwe Khoza
Group C	Guinea	0–3	Uganda	(Uganda) Allan Okello
Group A	Kenya	1–0	Morocco	(Kenya) Bryne Odhiambo
Group A	Zambia	1–2	Angola	(Angola) Kaporal
Group B	Central African Republic	0–1	Mauritania	(Mauritania) Ahmed El Moctar
Group B	Tanzania	2–1	Madagascar	(Tanzania) Clement Mzize
Group C	South Africa	2–1	Guinea	(South Africa) Thabiso Kutumela
Group C	Uganda	2–0	Niger	(Uganda) Joel Mutakubwa
Group D	Senegal	1–1	Congo	(Republic of the Congo) Dechan Moussavou
Group D	Sudan	4–0	Nigeria	(Sudan) Abdel Raouf
Group A	Morocco	3–1	Zambia	(Morocco) Youssef Mehri
Group A	Angola	0–2	DR Congo	(Democratic Republic of the Congo) Brudel Efonge
Group B	Madagascar	2–0	Central African Republic	(Madagascar) Michel Ramandimbisoa
Group B	Mauritania	1–0	Burkina Faso	(Mauritania) El Mami Tetah
Group C	Guinea	1–1	Algeria	(Guinea) Lass Bangoura
Group C	Niger	0–0	South Africa	(Niger) Mahamadou Tanja
Group A	DR Congo	1–3	Morocco	(Morocco) Oussama Lamlioui
Group A	Zambia	0–1	Kenya	(Kenya) Ryan Ogam
Group B	Burkina Faso	1–2	Madagascar	(Madagascar) Ramandimbisoa Michel Toldo
Group B	Central African Republic	0–0	Tanzania	(Tanzania) Feisal Salum Abdallah
Group C	Algeria	0–0	Niger	(Algeria) Naoufel Khacef
Group C	South Africa	3–3	Uganda	(South Africa) Ndabayithethwa Ndlondlo
Group D	Nigeria	2–0	Congo	(Nigeria) Alex Young Oyowah
Group D	Sudan	0–0	Senegal	(Sudan) Salah Eldin Adil Ahmed Al Hassan
Knock-out stage matches
Quarter-finals	Kenya	1–1 (a.e.t) (3-4 pen.)	Madagascar	(Kenya) Alpha Onyango
Quarter-finals	Tanzania	0–1	Morocco	(Morocco) Mohamed Rabie Hrimat
Quarter-finals	Sudan	1–1 (a.e.t) (4-2 pen.)	Algeria	(Sudan) Mohamed Abooja
Quarter-finals	Uganda	0–1	Senegal	(Senegal) Seyni Mbaye Ndiaye
Semi-finals	Madagascar	1–0	Sudan	(Madagascar) Rijaniaina Randriamanampisoa
Semi-finals	Morocco	1–1 (a.e.t) (5-3 pen.)	Senegal	(Morocco) Youssef Belammari
Third place play-off	Sudan	1–1 (2-4 pen.)	Senegal	(Senegal) Daouda Ba
Final	Madagascar	2–3	Morocco	(Morocco) Oussama Lamlioui
