= 2024 African Nations Championship final =

Football match in Kenya

- Event: 2024 African Nations Championship
Madagascar	Morocco
(Madagascar)	(Morocco)
2	3
- Date: 30 August 2025
- Venue: Moi International Sports Centre, Kasarani
- Man of the Match: Oussama Lamlioui (Morocco)
- Referee: Abdou Abdel Mefire

The 2024 African Nations Championship final was a football match to determine the winners of the 2024 African Nations Championship, the 8th and final edition of the tournament. It was held on 30 August 2025 at the Moi International Sports Centre in Kasarani, Kenya, between Madagascar and Morocco.

Morocco beat Madagascar 3-2, claiming their third CHAN title in six years. This also made them the most successful team in the history of the tournament, one better than DR Congo's two titles. Despite losing, Madagascar's underdog performance throughout the tournament was subject of praise, as they reached the first major continental final in their history.

Four months later in December 2025 the Confederation of African Football announced the cancellation of the competition, to be replaced by the African Nations League.

== Venue ==
The Moi International Sports Centre is a multi-purpose stadium in Kasarani, Kenya. It has hosted a variety of clubs and events, including domestic football teams Mathare United F.C. and Tusker F.C., the Kenyan national football team, and the Safari Sevens rugby tournament.

In 2024 the stadium was closed for renovations to prepare it for CHAN 2024 and the 2027 Africa Cup of Nations. It had its capacity reduced to 55,000, a larger roof installed, enhanced flood lighting upgraded to 3,000 Lux, video assistant referee cameras installed, and various upgrades to areas in the stadium.

== Background ==
Going into the tournament, Morocco were joint with DR Congo for the most successful team in the tournaments' history. They had won back-to-back editions in 2018 and 2020 but were unable to defend their title in 2022, withdrawing due to diplomatic tensions with host nation Algeria. They were also the strongest team in Africa at the time, ranked 14th in the world.

In contrast, Madagascar were underdogs. Not a historically strong team, they built momentum in recent years having reached the quarter-finals of their first-ever Africa Cup of Nations in 2019 despite being among the six worst teams on the continent, being labelled the "surprise of the tournament" and a "modern fairytale". In CHAN 2024 their success was also a surprise - it was only their second CHAN appearance after a reaching the quarter-finals in 2022, and their first in a major continental final. They were ranked 116th in the world at the time, 102 places below Morocco.

== Route to the final ==
Madagascar
Round
Morocco
Opponents
Result
Group stage
Opponents
Result
Mauritania
0–0
Match 1
Angola
2–0
Tanzania
1–2
Match 2
Kenya
0–1
Central African Republic
2–0
Match 3
Zambia
3–1
Burkina Faso
2–1
Match 4
DR Congo
3–1
Group B Runner-Up

Pos	Team	Pld	Pts
1	Tanzania (H)	4	10
2	Madagascar	4	7
3	Mauritania	4	7
4	Burkina Faso	4	3
5	Central African Republic	4	1

(H) Hosts
Final standings
Group A Runner-Up

Pos	Team	Pld	Pts
1	Kenya (H)	4	10
2	Morocco	4	9
3	DR Congo	4	6
4	Angola	4	4
5	Zambia	4	0

(H) Hosts
Opponents
Result
Knockout stage
Opponents
Result
Kenya
1–1 (4-3 p)
Quarter-finals
Tanzania
1–0
Sudan
1–0 (a.e.t.)
Semi-finals
Senegal
1–1 (5-3 p)

== Match ==
=== Summary ===
The first big chance of the game fell for Morocco, when tournament top scorer Oussama Lamlioui went through one-on-one against Michel Ramandimbisoa but skimmed the outside of the post with a side-footed effort. Shortly after, Madagascar's Félicité Manohantsoa put the underdogs ahead in the 9th minute with a spectacular half volley from 25 yards out, looping the ball over the head of El Mehdi Al Harrar into the top-left corner. Their lead was short-lived however, as 18 minutes later in 27th minute Youssef Mehri headed home a cross from Khalid Baba. Morocco then took the lead in 44th with Oussama Lamlioui poking in a deflected cross at the back post.

Madagascar coach Romuald Rakotondrabe made three changes at half-time, bringing on Toky Rakotondraibe in the process. Midway through the second-half in 68th, Madagascar captain Tony Randriamanampisoa chipped an optimistic ball into the centre of the pitch which was flicked on by first-half goalscorer Félicité Manohantsoa. Substitute Rakotondraibe pounced on the header and poked in a clever finish from inside the box, equalising the game again against the run of play.

There was still more drama to be had. With just 10 minutes left of normal time, Oussama Lamlioui outmuscled Mamisoa Rakotoson to a loose bouncing ball in midfield. Spotting Madagascar goalkeeper Michel Ramandimbisoa off of his line, Lamlioui struck the ball on the half-volley from forty yards out, looping it into the goal and restoring Morocco's lead. Despite some late Malagasy pressure, Morocco held on to claim their third title.

=== Details ===
30 August 2025
17:00 EAT

Madagascar	2-3	Morocco
Manohantsoa 9'; Rakotondraibe 68'	Report	Mehri 27'; Lamlioui 44', 80'

Moi International Sports Centre, Kasarani
Referee: Abdou Abdel Mefire (Cameroon)

Madagascar	Morocco

GK	1	Michel Ramandimbisoa
RB	4	Tony Randriamanampisoa (c)
CB	3	Toky Randrianirina
CB	5	Hajatiana Ratsimbazafy
LB	20	Bono Randriamirehitra
DM	8	Lalaina Rafanomezantsoa
RM	7	Patrick Randrianantenaina	(yellow card) 30'	(substituted off) 46'
CM	2	Nicolas Randriamanampisoa		(substituted off) 46'
LM	13	Mika Razafimahatana		(substituted off) 46'
CF	7	Félicité Manohantsoa	(yellow card) 29'
CF	17	Jean Luc Ranaivoson
Substitutions:
MF	10	Arohasina Andrianarimanana		(substituted on) 46'
FW	20	Toky Rakotondraibe		(substituted on) 46'
MF	25	Mamisoa Rakotoson		(substituted on) 46'
MF	12	Onjaniaina Hasinirina		(substituted on) 86'
MF	11	Ryan Rajaonarivelo		(substituted on) 90+2'
Manager:
Romuald Rakotondrabe

GK	1	El Mehdi Al Harrar
RB	7	Mohamed Boulacsout
CB	4	Marouane Louadni
CB	3	Anas Bach
LB	17	Youssef Belammari	(yellow card) 17'
DM	5	Ayoub Khairi		(substituted off) 90'
LM	10	Mohamed Rabie Hrimat (c)
RM	10	Sabir Bougrine		(substituted off) 79'
RF	21	Youssef Mehri		(substituted off) 86'
CF	9	Oussama Lamlioui	(yellow card) 82'	(substituted off) 90'
LF	26	Khalid Baba		(substituted off) 79'
Substitutions:
FW	16	Salah-Eddine Errahouli		(substituted on) 79'
MF	8	Khalid Ait Ouarkhane		(substituted on) 79'
DF	16	Mohamed Moufid		(substituted on) 86'	(yellow card) 90+3'
MF	8	Amine Souane		(substituted on) 90'
DF	8	Bouchaib Arrassi		(substituted on) 90'
Manager:
Tarik Sektioui

Man of the Match:
Oussama Lamlioui (Morocco)

Assistant referees:
Eleyeh Robleh (Djibouti)
Joel Wonka Doe (Liberia)
Fourth official:
Dickens Mimisa (Kenya)

Match rules

- 90 minutes.
- 30 minutes of extra time if necessary.
- Penalty shoot-out if scores still level.
- Maximum of five substitutions, with a sixth allowed in extra time.
- Maximum of three substitution opportunities, with a fourth allowed in extra time.

== Post-match ==
With two goals in the final, Oussama Lamlioui won the tournaments' golden boot with a total of six goals. Morocco captain Mohamed Rabie Hrimat won the Best Player award for his leadership throughout the competition.

This victory gave Morocco its third title and made it the most successful team in the history of the tournament, one better than DR Congo's two titles. Morocco's manager Tarik Sektioui was nominated for the 2025 CAF Coach of the Year in recognition of the achievement. Despite losing, Madagascar were praised for their underdog performance in reaching the first major continental final in their history, and their coach Romuald Rakotondrabe was also nominated for the 2025 CAF Coach of the Year award.

In December 2025, four months after the tournaments' conclusion, the Confederation of African Football announced that the 2024 edition would be the last CHAN tournament, and it was to be replaced by the African Nations League beginning in 2029.

== See also ==
- 2024 African Nations Championship
