= Jerome Kirya =

Ugandan footballer (born 1997)

Personal information
- Full name: Jerome Kirya
- Date of birth: June 18, 1997 (age 29)
- Place of birth: Uganda
- Position: Midfielder

Team information
- Current team: BUL FC
- Number: 14

Youth career
- Kirinnya Jinja SS

Senior career*
Years	Team	Apps	(Gls)
2018–2021	Busoga United		
2021–Present	BUL FC		(4)
- * Club domestic league appearances and goals as of 17 August 2025

Jerome Kirya (born 18 June 1997) is a Ugandan professional footballer who plays as a midfielder for BUL FC in the Uganda Premier League and the Uganda national football team.

== Football career ==
Kirya started his football career at Kirinnya Jinja Secondary School, before progressing into professional football with Busoga United. He made his Uganda Premier League debut during the 2018–19 season.

=== Busoga United ===
Kirya established himself at Busoga United, featuring in midfield across three seasons in the Uganda Premier League.

=== BUL FC ===
In 2021, Kirya signed a two-year contract with BUL FC. BUL FC announced that Kirya had extended his stay at the club with a new contract running until 2026.

== Career statistics ==
Season	Club	Goals	Assists
2023–24	BUL FC	4	2

== Honours ==
=== Individual ===
- BUL FC Fans’ Player of the Season: 2023–24

== See also ==
- Allan Okello
- Reagan Mpande
- Rogers Ochaki Torach
