= 2024 African Nations Championship qualification =

Qualification for the 2024 CHAN

Tournament details
- Dates: 25 October 2024 – 9 May 2025
- Teams: 59 (from 1 confederation)

Tournament statistics
- Matches played: 52
- Goals scored: 99 (1.9 per match)
- All statistics correct as of 17 October 2025.

The 2024 African Nations Championship qualification was a men's football competition which decided the participating teams of the 2024 African Nations Championship. Only national team players who were playing in their country's own domestic league were eligible to compete in the tournament.

A total of 19 teams qualified to play in the final tournament, including Kenya, Uganda and Tanzania who qualified automatically as hosts.

== Teams ==
A total of 40 (out of 54) CAF member national teams entered qualification that was split into zones based on their regional affiliations and had its draw held on 9 October 2024 at CAF headquarters in Cairo, Egypt.

| Zone | Spots (total 19) | Teams entering qualification | Repêchage re-engage teams | Did not enter |
|---|---|---|---|---|
| Northern Zone (UNAF) | 3 spots | ~~Libya~~ **(W)**; **Morocco**; ~~Tunisia~~ **(W)** | **Algeria**; Egypt | |
| Western Zone A (WAFU-UFOA A) | 3 spots | **Guinea**; Guinea-Bissau; Liberia; Mali; **Mauritania**; **Senegal**; Sierra Leone | Gambia | Cape Verde |
| Western Zone B (WAFU-UFOA B) | 3 spots | Benin; **Burkina Faso**; Ghana; Ivory Coast; **Niger**; **Nigeria**; Togo | | |
| Central Zone (UNIFFAC) | 3 spots | Cameroon; **Central African Republic**; Chad; **Congo**; **DR Congo**; Equatorial Guinea | Gabon | São Tomé and Príncipe |
| Central Eastern Zone (CECAFA) | 1 spot + **Kenya**, **Tanzania**, **Uganda** (hosts) | Burundi; Djibouti; ~~Eritrea~~ **(W)**; Ethiopia; Rwanda; ~~Somalia~~ **(W)**; South Sudan; **Sudan** | | |
| Southern Zone (COSAFA) | 3 spots | **Angola**; Eswatini; Lesotho; **Madagascar**; Mozambique; Namibia; **Zambia**; Zimbabwe | Comoros; **South Africa**; Malawi | Botswana; Mauritius; Seychelles |

Notes

- Teams in **bold** qualified for the final tournament.
- Teams in italics received a bye to the second round in the qualifying draw.
- (W): Withdrew after draw

== Format ==
Qualification ties are played on a home-and-away two-legged basis. If the aggregate score is tied after the second leg, the away goals rule would be applied, and if still level, the penalty shoot-out would be used to determine the winner (no extra time would be played).

== Schedule ==
The schedule of the qualifying rounds is as follows.

| Zone / Round | | Matchday | Date |
| Western Zone A Western Zone B Central Eastern Zone Southern Zone | Central Zone | Matchday | Date |
|---|---|---|---|
| First round | — | First leg | 25–27 October 2024 |
| First round | — | Second leg | 31 October – 3 November 2024 |
| Second round | First round | First leg | 20–22 December 2024 |
| Second round | First round | Second leg | 27–29 December 2024 |

== Northern Zone ==
After Egypt and previous hosts Algeria withdrew before the draw, Libya, Morocco and Tunisia were the only teams entered: therefore, the Zone was scrapped and all three teams qualified automatically. On 22 November 2024, Libya withdrew from the tournament due to fixture congestion and concerns that the national team's participation would halt the league, hence the Libyan Football Federation prioritized the league schedule over the CHAN. On 28 November 2024, Tunisia also pulled out of the tournament following the clubs' rejection to the country's participation.

== Western Zone A ==
=== First round ===
| Team 1 | Agg. | Team 2 | 1st leg | 2nd leg |
|---|---|---|---|---|
| Sierra Leone | 2–3 | Liberia | 1–2 | 1–1 |

27 October 2024
16:00 UTC+0

| Sierra Leone | 1–2 | Liberia |
|---|---|---|
| Kalokoh 22' | Report | Kumeh 3'; Kabia 58' (o.g.) |

Samuel Kanyon Doe Sports Complex, Monrovia (Liberia)
1 November 2024
16:00 UTC+0

| Liberia | 1–1 | Sierra Leone |
|---|---|---|
| Kumeh 63' | Report | Dumbuya 22' |

Samuel Kanyon Doe Sports Complex, Monrovia

Liberia won 3–2 on aggregate.

=== Second round ===
Winners qualify for the 2024 African Nations Championship.

| Team 1 | Agg. | Team 2 | 1st leg | 2nd leg |
|---|---|---|---|---|
| Liberia | 1–4 | Senegal | 1–1 | 0–3 |
| Mauritania | 1–0 | Mali | 1–0 | 0–0 |
| Guinea | 6–2 | Guinea-Bissau | 4–1 | 2–1 |

22 December 2024
16:00 UTC+0

| Liberia | 1–1 | Senegal |
|---|---|---|
| Bilty 81' | Report | Mbaye 75' |

Samuel Kanyon Doe Sports Complex, Monrovia
28 December 2024
17:00 UTC+0

| Senegal | 3–0 | Liberia |
|---|---|---|
| Ba 3'; Ciss 38'; Mbaye 90+2' | Report |

Stade Abdoulaye Wade, Dakar

Senegal won 4–1 on aggregate.

22 December 2024
17:00 UTC+0

| Mauritania | 1–0 | Mali |
|---|---|---|
| Tetah 64' | Report |

Cheikha Ould Boïdiya Stadium, Nouakchott
Referee: Lamin Jammeh (Gambia)
29 December 2024
16:00 UTC+0

| Mali | 0–0 | Mauritania |
|---|---|---|
| | Report |

Stade du 26 Mars, Bamako

Mauritania won 1–0 on aggregate.

20 December 2024
16:00 UTC+0

| Guinea | 4–1 | Guinea-Bissau |
|---|---|---|
| Kouyaté 26'; M. S. Bangoura 53'; Dramé 64'; M. Bangoura 80' | Report | Bidane 45+2' |

Felix Houphouet Boigny Stadium, Abidjan (Ivory Coast)
28 December 2024
16:00 UTC+0

| Guinea-Bissau | 1–2 | Guinea |
|---|---|---|
| Baldé 45+3' (pen.) | Report | M. S. Bangoura 51'; N. Bangoura 78' |

Estádio 24 de Setembro, Bissau

Guinea won 6–2 on aggregate.

== Western Zone B ==
=== First round ===
| Team 1 | Agg. | Team 2 | 1st leg | 2nd leg |
|---|---|---|---|---|
| Togo | 3–1 | Benin | 2–0 | 1–1 |

25 October 2024
16:00 UTC+0

| Togo | 2–0 | Benin |
|---|---|---|
| Abalo 12'; Avotor 90+2' | Report |

Stade de Kégué, Lomé
Referee: Salisu Basheer (Nigeria)
2 November 2024
17:00 UTC+0

| Benin | 1–1 | Togo |
|---|---|---|
| Ramzi 90' | Report | Kloukpo 4' |

Felix Houphouet Boigny Stadium, Abidjan (Ivory Coast)
Referee: Kouassi Frédéric Biro (Ivory Coast)

Togo won 3–1 on aggregate.

=== Second round ===
Winners qualify for the 2024 African Nations Championship.

| Team 1 | Agg. | Team 2 | 1st leg | 2nd leg |
|---|---|---|---|---|
| Togo | 1–1 (a) | Niger | 1–1 | 0–0 |
| Ivory Coast | 2–2 (2–4 p) | Burkina Faso | 2–0 | 0–2 |
| Ghana | 1–3 | Nigeria | 0–0 | 1–3 |

22 December 2024
16:00 UTC+0

| Togo | 1–1 | Niger |
|---|---|---|
| Sama 37' | Report | Jules 64' |

Stade de Kégué, Lomé
Referee: Jean Ouattara (Burkina Faso)
27 December 2024
16:00 UTC+0

| Niger | 0–0 | Togo |
|---|---|---|
| | Report |

Stade du 26 Mars, Bamako (Mali)
Referee: Franklin Kpan (Ivory Coast)

1–1 on aggregate. Niger won on away goals.

22 December 2024
16:00 UTC+0

| Ivory Coast | 2–0 | Burkina Faso |
|---|---|---|
| Konaté 16', 52' | Report |

Felix Houphouet Boigny Stadium, Abidjan
Referee: Dedjinnanchi Tanislas Ahomlanto (Benin)
28 December 2024
16:00 UTC+0

| Burkina Faso | 2–0 | Ivory Coast |
|---|---|---|
| Traoré 30'; Kanté 53' | Report |
Penalties
| Traoré (penalty missed); Guiro (penalty scored); Kanté (penalty scored); Diarra (penalty scored); Malo (penalty scored) | 4–2 | (penalty missed) Kacou; (penalty scored) Britto; (penalty scored) Zouzou; (penalty missed) Konaté |

Stade du 26 Mars, Bamako (Mali)

2–2 on aggregate. Burkina Faso won 4–2 on penalties.

22 December 2024
16:00 UTC+0

| Ghana | 0–0 | Nigeria |
|---|---|---|
| | Report |

Accra Sports Stadium, Accra
Referee: Aklesso Gnama (Togo)
28 December 2024
17:00 UTC+1

| Nigeria | 3–1 | Ghana |
|---|---|---|
| Sodiq 19'; Junior 22'; Saviour 25' | Report | Amankuna 73' |

Godswill Akpabio International Stadium, Uyo
Referee: Hamza El Fareq (Morocco)

Nigeria won 3–1 on aggregate.

== Central Zone ==
Winners qualify for the 2024 African Nations Championship.

| Team 1 | Agg. | Team 2 | 1st leg | 2nd leg |
|---|---|---|---|---|
| Equatorial Guinea | 6–0 | Congo | 3–0 | 0–3 |
| Central African Republic | 2–2 (a) | Cameroon | 0–1 | 2–1 |
| Chad | 2–4 | DR Congo | 1–1 | 1–3 |

21 December 2024
16:00 UTC+1

| Equatorial Guinea | 3–0 Awarded | Congo |
|---|---|---|
| | Report |

Nuevo Estadio de Malabo, Malabo
29 December 2024
15:00 UTC+1

| Congo | 0–3 Awarded | Equatorial Guinea |
|---|---|---|
| Mankou 16'; Lendambi 25' (pen.) | Report | Obiang 46' |

Stade Alphonse Massemba-Débat, Brazzaville
Referee: Cregue Moukagni (Gabon)

Initially, Congo won 2–1 on aggregate. However, following a ruling by the CAF Disciplinary Committee in favor of Equatorial Guinea, Congo was found to have fielded an ineligible player in both matches. As a result, both matches were declared forfeited by Congo, awarding Equatorial Guinea a 6–0 aggregate victory.

22 December 2024
19:00 UTC+0

| Central African Republic | 0–1 | Cameroon |
|---|---|---|
| | Report | Fouda 50' |

Alassane Ouattara Stadium, Abidjan (Ivory Coast)
28 December 2024
14:00 UTC+1

| Cameroon | 1–2 | Central African Republic |
|---|---|---|
| Yondjo 31' | Report | Ndokomandji 43' (pen.); Yangana 87' |

Stade Omnisports de Bafoussam, Bafoussam
Referee: Jean Pierre Nguiene Bissila (Congo)

2–2 on aggregate. Central African Republic won on away goals.

21 December 2024
16:00 UTC+0

| Chad | 1–1 | DR Congo |
|---|---|---|
| Yannick 27' | Report | Kabwit 19' |

Alassane Ouattara Stadium, Abidjan (Ivory Coast)
Referee: André Kolissala Mbangul (Central African Republic)
28 December 2024
17:00 UTC+1

| DR Congo | 3–1 | Chad |
|---|---|---|
| Kabwit 18'; Mokonzi 48'; Ntumba 52' | Report | Abderamane 23' |

Stade des Martyrs, Kinshasa

DR Congo won 4–2 on aggregate.

== Central Eastern Zone ==
=== First round ===
| Team 1 | Agg. | Team 2 | 1st leg | 2nd leg |
|---|---|---|---|---|
| Burundi | w/o | Somalia | — | — |
| Ethiopia | w/o | Eritrea | — | — |
| Sudan | 1–1 (6–5 p) | Tanzania | 1–0 | 0–1 |
| South Sudan | 3–1 | Kenya | 2–0 | 1–1 |
| Djibouti | 1–3 | Rwanda | 1–0 | 0–3 |

24 October 2024

| Burundi | Cancelled | Somalia |
|---|---|---|
| | Report |

1 November 2024

| Somalia | Cancelled | Burundi |
|---|---|---|
| | Report |

Burundi won on walkover and advanced to the second round after Somalia withdrew prior to the first leg due to financial challenges.

21 October 2024
16:00 UTC+3

| Ethiopia | Cancelled | Eritrea |
|---|---|---|
| | Report |

Juba Stadium, Juba (South Sudan)
3 November 2024
16:00 UTC+3

| Eritrea | Cancelled | Ethiopia |
|---|---|---|
| | Report |

Juba Stadium, Juba (South Sudan)

Ethiopia won on walkover and advanced to the second round after Eritrea withdrew prior to the first leg.

27 October 2024
19:00 UTC+0

| Sudan | 1–0 | Tanzania |
|---|---|---|
| Abdelrahman 23' | Report |

Cheikha Ould Boïdiya Stadium, Nouakchott (Mauritania)
3 November 2024
16:00 UTC+3

| Tanzania | 1–0 | Sudan |
|---|---|---|
| Mhagama 33' | Report |
Penalties
| Ibrahim (penalty scored); Bryson (penalty scored); Said (penalty scored); Kondo (penalty scored); Kassim (penalty scored); Peter (penalty missed) | 5–6 | (penalty scored) Khedr; (penalty scored) Abdelrahman; (penalty scored) Elsawi; (penalty scored) Hemedelnil; (penalty scored) Agab; (penalty scored) Adel |

Benjamin Mkapa Stadium, Dar es Salaam

1–1 on aggregate. Sudan won 6–5 on penalties.

27 October 2024
15:00 UTC+3

| South Sudan | 2–0 | Kenya |
|---|---|---|
| E. Malish 50'; Paulino 68' | Report |

Juba Stadium, Juba
3 November 2024
16:00 UTC+3

| Kenya | 1–1 | South Sudan |
|---|---|---|
| Odhiambo 7' | Report | E. Malish 43' |

Mandela National Stadium, Kampala (Uganda)

South Sudan won 3–1 on aggregate.

27 October 2024
15:00 UTC+2

| Djibouti | 1–0 | Rwanda |
|---|---|---|
| Dadzie 79' | Report |

Amahoro Stadium, Kigali (Rwanda)
31 October 2024
18:00 UTC+2

| Rwanda | 3–0 | Djibouti |
|---|---|---|
| Dushimimana 17', 25'; Tuyisenge 89' | Report |

Amahoro Stadium, Kigali
Referee: William Oloya (Uganda)

Rwanda won 3–1 on aggregate.

=== Second round ===
Since the three hosts from this region have automatically qualified themselves, only the best-performing nation (excluding the hosts) can additionally qualify for the 2024 African Nations Championship.

| Team 1 | Agg. | Team 2 | 1st leg | 2nd leg |
|---|---|---|---|---|
| Burundi | 0–2 | Uganda | 0–1 | 0–1 |
| Ethiopia | 1–4 | Sudan | 0–2 | 1–2 |
| South Sudan | 4–4 (a) | Rwanda | 3–2 | 1–2 |

26 December 2024
18:00 UTC+3

| Burundi | 0–1 | Uganda |
|---|---|---|
| | Report | Ogwang 35' |

Hamz Stadium, Kampala (Uganda)
29 December 2024
18:00 UTC+3

| Uganda | 1–0 | Burundi |
|---|---|---|
| Kiwanuka 90+1' | Report |

Hamz Stadium, Kampala

Uganda won 2–0 on aggregate.

22 December 2024
16:00 UTC+2

| Ethiopia | 0–2 | Sudan |
|---|---|---|
| | Report | Muzmel 7'; Musa Kanti 90+6' |

Benina Martyrs Stadium, Benghazi (Libya)
25 December 2024
16:00 UTC+2

| Sudan | 2–1 | Ethiopia |
|---|---|---|
| Musa Kanti 16'; Abdelrahman 69' | Report | Bekele 63' |

Benina Martyrs Stadium, Benghazi (Libya)

Sudan won 4–1 on aggregate.

22 December 2024
16:00 UTC+3

| South Sudan | 3–2 | Rwanda |
|---|---|---|
| Nsabimana 13' (o.g.); M. Malish 20'; E. Malish 53' | Report | Muhire 49'; Mugisha 66' |

Juba Stadium, Juba
28 December 2024
19:00 UTC+3

| Rwanda | 2–1 | South Sudan |
|---|---|---|
| Mugisha 33'; Muhire 56' | Report | Sebit 80' |

Amahoro Stadium, Kigali

4–4 on aggregate. Rwanda won on away goals.

== Southern Zone ==
=== First round ===
| Team 1 | Agg. | Team 2 | 1st leg | 2nd leg |
|---|---|---|---|---|
| Zimbabwe | 0–4 | Eswatini | 0–3 | 0–1 |
| Lesotho | 1–1 (4–3 p) | Namibia | 1–0 | 0–1 |

27 October 2024
15:00 UTC+2

| Zimbabwe | 0–3 | Eswatini |
|---|---|---|
| | Report | Matse 6'; Magagula 38', 51' |

Obed Itani Chilume Stadium, Francistown (Botswana)
2 November 2024
18:00 UTC+2

| Eswatini | 1–0 | Zimbabwe |
|---|---|---|
| Magagula 69' | Report |

Mbombela Stadium, Mbombela (South Africa)

Eswatini won 4–0 on aggregate.

26 October 2024
18:00 UTC+2

| Lesotho | 1–0 | Namibia |
|---|---|---|
| Kalake 23' | Report |

Free State Stadium, Bloemfontein (South Africa)
3 November 2024
15:00 UTC+2

| Namibia | 1–0 | Lesotho |
|---|---|---|
| Doeseb 61' | Report |
Penalties
| Stephanus (penalty scored); Katua (penalty scored); Eiseb (penalty missed); Amutenya (penalty scored); Hambira (penalty missed) | 3–4 | (penalty scored) Matšoele; (penalty scored) Kalake; (penalty scored) Kamela; (penalty scored) Toloane; (penalty missed) Fothoane |

Free State Stadium, Bloemfontein (South Africa)
Referee: Thulani Sibandze (Eswatini)

1–1 on aggregate. Lesotho won 4–3 on penalties.

=== Second round ===
Winners qualify for the 2024 African Nations Championship.

| Team 1 | Agg. | Team 2 | 1st leg | 2nd leg |
|---|---|---|---|---|
| Eswatini | 1–2 | Madagascar | 0–2 | 1–0 |
| Lesotho | 1–2 | Angola | 0–2 | 1–0 |
| Mozambique | w/o | Zambia | — | — |

21 December 2024
18:00 UTC+2

| Eswatini | 0–2 | Madagascar |
|---|---|---|
| | Report | Rarazafimanana 20'; Razafimaro 22' |

Mbombela Stadium, Mbombela (South Africa)
29 December 2024
17:00 UTC+3

| Madagascar | 0–1 | Eswatini |
|---|---|---|
| | Report | Simelane 86' |

Cote d'Or National Sports Complex, Saint Pierre (Mauritius)

Madagascar won 2–1 on aggregate.

21 December 2024
15:00 UTC+2

| Lesotho | 0–2 | Angola |
|---|---|---|
| | Report | Megue 17'; Kaporal 21' |

Moses Mabhida Stadium, Durban (South Africa)
28 December 2024
17:30 UTC+1

| Angola | 0–1 | Lesotho |
|---|---|---|
| | Report | Kalake 43' (pen.) |

Estádio 11 de Novembro, Luanda

Angola won 2–1 on aggregate.

21 December 2024
17:00 UTC+2

| Mozambique | Cancelled | Zambia |
|---|---|---|
| | Report |

Estádio do Zimpeto, Maputo
28 December 2024
15:00 UTC+2

| Zambia | Cancelled | Mozambique |
|---|---|---|
| | Report |

Levy Mwanawasa Stadium, Ndola

Zambia won on walkover and qualified to the final tournament after Mozambique withdrew prior to the first leg due to post-election violence.

== Second qualifying stage ==
Following the withdrawals of Tunisia and Libya, it was decided to organise a second qualifier tournament between 7 'reengaged' teams: Algeria, Comoros, Egypt, Gabon, The Gambia, Malawi, South Africa to determine the final two slots.

The draw was held on 13 February 2025 at 13:25 EST (UTC+2) at the Confederation of African Football Headquarters in Cairo, Egypt. The 7 teams were drawn into 3 games, with Runners-up of the previous edition Algeria receiving a bye to the second round.

=== First round ===
| Team 1 | Agg. | Team 2 | 1st leg | 2nd leg |
|---|---|---|---|---|
| Comoros | 0–4 | Malawi | 0–2 | 0–2 |
| South Africa | 4–2 | Egypt | 1–1 | 3–1 |
| Gambia | 0–0 (5–3 p) | Gabon | 0–0 | 0–0 |

2 March 2025
15:00 UTC+2

| Comoros | 0–2 | Malawi |
|---|---|---|
| | Report | Katinji 43'; Kalima 90' |

Bingu National Stadium, Lilongwe (Malawi)
8 March 2025
15:00 UTC+2

| Malawi | 2–0 | Comoros |
|---|---|---|
| Lungu 50'; Katinji 59' | Report |

Bingu National Stadium, Lilongwe

Malawi won 4–0 on aggregate.

2 March 2025
17:00 UTC+2

| South Africa | 1–1 | Egypt |
|---|---|---|
| Webber 80' | Report | Mohamed Antar 66' |

Free State Stadium, Bloemfontein
9 March 2025
21:30 UTC+2

| Egypt | 1–3 | South Africa |
|---|---|---|
| Mohamed Shika 32' | Report | Maema 15'; Mfolozi 26'; Luthuli 50' |

Suez Canal Stadium, Ismailia

South Africa won 4–2 on aggregate.

28 February 2025
21:30 UTC+0

| Gambia | 0–0 | Gabon |
|---|---|---|
| | Report |

Stade Lat-Dior, Thiès (Senegal)
8 March 2025
16:00 UTC+1

| Gabon | 0–0 | Gambia |
|---|---|---|
| | Report |
Penalties
| Evouna (penalty scored); Assoumou (penalty scored); Ndong (penalty scored); Oyono (penalty missed) | 3–5 | (penalty scored) Tambedou; (penalty scored) Sanyang; (penalty scored) Camara; (penalty scored) Gaye; (penalty scored) Jobe |

Stade de Franceville, Franceville

0–0 on aggregate. Gambia won 5–3 on penalties.

=== Second round ===
| Team 1 | Agg. | Team 2 | 1st leg | 2nd leg |
|---|---|---|---|---|
| Malawi | 1–2 | South Africa | 1–0 | 0–2 |
| Gambia | 0–3 | Algeria | 0–0 | 0–3 |

3 May 2025
15:00 UTC+2

| Malawi | 1–0 | South Africa |
|---|---|---|
| Nkhoma 87' | Report |

Bingu National Stadium, Lilongwe
Referee: Numbi Kibingo (DR Congo)
11 May 2025
15:00 UTC+2

| South Africa | 2–0 | Malawi |
|---|---|---|
| Letsoalo 12'; Maema 87' | Report |

Loftus Versfeld Stadium, Pretoria
Referee: Tewodros Mitiku (Ethiopia)

South Africa won 2–1 on aggregate.

3 May 2025
15:00 UTC+0

| Gambia | 0–0 | Algeria |
|---|---|---|
| | Report |

Independence Stadium, Bakau
Referee: Mohamed Athoumani (Comoros)
9 May 2025
20:30 UTC+1

| Algeria | 3–0 | Gambia |
|---|---|---|
| Meziane 46'; Boulbina 71', 90+1' | Report |

19 May 1956 Stadium, Annaba
Referee: Ibrahim Traoré (Ivory Coast)

Algeria won 3–0 on aggregate.

== Qualified teams ==
The following 19 teams qualified for the final tournament.

| Team | Qualifying zone | Qualified on | Previous appearances in African Nations Championship |
|---|---|---|---|
| Kenya (co-hosts) | Central Eastern Zone | 26 September 2024 | 0 (debut) |
| Tanzania (co-hosts) | Central Eastern Zone | 26 September 2024 | 2 (2009, 2020) |
| Uganda (co-hosts) | Central Eastern Zone | 26 September 2024 | 6 (2011, 2014, 2016, 2018, 2020, 2022) |
| Morocco | Northern Zone | 9 October 2024 | 4 (2014, 2016, **2018**, **2020**) |
| Guinea | Western Zone A | 28 December 2024 | 3 (2016, 2018, 2020) |
| Senegal | Western Zone A | 28 December 2024 | 3 (2009, 2011, **2022**) |
| Mauritania | Western Zone A | 29 December 2024 | 3 (2014, 2018, 2022) |
| Burkina Faso | Western Zone B | 28 December 2024 | 3 (2014, 2018, 2022) |
| Niger | Western Zone B | 27 December 2024 | 4 (2011, 2016, 2020, 2022) |
| Nigeria | Western Zone B | 28 December 2024 | 3 (2014, 2016, 2018) |
| Central African Republic | Central Zone | 28 December 2024 | 0 (debut) |
| DR Congo | Central Zone | 28 December 2024 | 6 (**2009**, 2011, 2014, **2016**, 2020, 2022) |
| Equatorial Guinea | Central Zone | 21 January 2025 | 1 (2018) |
| Sudan | Central Eastern Zone | 28 December 2024 | 3 (2011, 2018, 2022) |
| Angola | Southern Zone | 28 December 2024 | 4 (2011, 2016, 2018, 2022) |
| Madagascar | Southern Zone | 29 December 2024 | 1 (2022) |
| Zambia | Southern Zone | 15 December 2024 | 4 (2009, 2016, 2018, 2020) |
| Algeria | Second qualifying stage winners | 9 May 2025 | 2 (2011, 2022) |
| South Africa | Second qualifying stage winners | 11 May 2025 | 2 (2011, 2014) |

Notes

- Years in **bold** indicate a championship in the respective tournament.
