= Ogama Baden Mujahid =

Ugandan footballer (born 1997)

Baden Ogama
Personal information
- Full name: Ogama Baden Mujahid
- Date of birth: 15 July 1997 (age 29)
- Position: Forward

Team information
- Current team: Maroons FC
- Number: 18

Youth career
- St Mary’s Kitende

Senior career*
Years	Team	Apps	(Gls)
2017–2021	Vipers SC		
2018–2019	→ Ndejje University (loan)		
2019–2020	→ Maroons FC (loan)		
2021–2023	Arua Hill SC		
2023–Present	Maroons FC		
- * Club domestic league appearances and goals

Ogama Baden Mujahid (born 15 July 1997) is a Ugandan professional footballer who plays as a forward for Maroons FC in the Uganda Premier League.

== Club career ==
Ogama developed at St Mary’s Kitende before moving into senior football with Vipers SC, where he was part of the squad in the late 2010s. He had loan spells while under contract at Vipers, including with Ndejje University and Maroons FC. In 2021 he signed for Arua Hill SC and in 2023 returned to Maroons FC.

Notable performances include a brace in Maroons’ 3–0 win over Mbarara City in December 2024 and a goal in the win over URA FC (Matchday 8, 2024–25).

== Playing style ==
Ogama is primarily deployed as a central forward; reports and match coverage highlight his movement inside the box and finishing ability, traits that produced several crucial goals for Maroons during the 2024–25 campaign.

== Honours ==
- Vipers SC
  - Uganda Premier League: 2017–18
  - Super 8 Cup: 2018

== See also ==
- Allan Okello
- Rogers Ochaki Torach
- Reagan Mpande
- Ashraf Mandela
