= Joel Sserunjogi =

Ugandan footballer (born 2002)

Personal information
- Full name: Joel Sserunjogi
- Date of birth: June 16, 2002 (age 24)
- Position: Midfielder

Team information
- Current team: Vipers Sports Club
- Number: 6

Youth career
- URA FC Youth
- Kajjansi United

Senior career*
Years	Team	Apps	(Gls)
2023–2026	KCCA FC		
2026-present	Vipers SC		

International career
2024–Present	Uganda Cranes		
- * Club domestic league appearances and goals

Joel Sserunjogi (born 16 June 2002) is a Ugandan professional footballer who plays as a midfielder for Vipers SC in the Uganda Premier League and the Uganda Cranes.

== Early life ==
Sserunjogi grew up in Uganda, where he featured in youth football competitions. He represented Buddu and later Busiro in the Buganda Masaza Cup, helping Busiro to win their maiden title in 2022. He also played for Kajjansi United and was part of the URA FC youth system.

== Club career ==
In August 2023, Sserunjogi signed a contract with KCCA FC lasting until 2026, with an option to extend. He became known for his vision, accurate passing, and ability to dictate play in midfield.

In March 2024, Sserunjogi earned praise from coach Abdallah Mubiru after a man-of-the-match performance against Vipers SC.

== International career ==
Sserunjogi received his first call-up to the Uganda Cranes in May 2024 for the 2026 FIFA World Cup qualifiers.

He was later included in the squad for the 2025 Africa Cup of Nations qualifiers.

In 2025, he was selected for Uganda Cranes squad for the 2024 African Nations Championship CHAN) hosted by three East African countries; Kenya, Tanzania and Uganda.

== Honours ==
=== Busiro ===
- Buganda Masaza Cup: 2022

== See also ==
- Allan Okello
- Reagan Mpande
- Rogers Ochaki Torach
