= Ministry of Justice (Mali) =

The Ministry of Justice and Human Rights for Mali prepares and executes the national policy on justice, human rights, and the seals of the state. Other responsibilities include the following:

- Civil, criminal and commercial legislation
- Sentencing enforcement
- Administration of judicial and penitentiary services
- Overseeing statutes pertaining to the judiciary and legal and judicial professions
- Protecting human rights
- Aiding in the fight against terrorism, organized crime, human trafficking, corruption, and other forms of economic and financial crime

== List of ministers (Post-1960 upon achieving independence) ==
- Jean-Marie Kone (1960-1962)
- Mamadou Madeira Keita (1963-1968)
- Ibrahima Sall (1968-1969)
- Hamicire N'Doure (1969-1970)
- Joseph Mara (1972-1975)
- Mamadou Sanogo (1976-1979)
- Boubacar Sidibe (1979-1982)
- Issa Ongoiba (1982-1985)
- Django Sissoko (1985-1988)
- Oumar Ba (1988-1989)
- Mamdou Cissoko (1990)
- Samou Soumare (1991)
- Mamadou Ouattara (1991)
- Amadou Mody Diall (1992)
- Mag Koudissa Traore (1993)
- Hamidou Diabate (1993-1994)
- Boubacar Gaoussou Diarra (1994-1995)
- Cheickna Dettenha Kamissoko (1995-1997)
- Hamidou Diabate (1997-2000)
- Abdoulaye Ogotembely Poudiougou (2000-2004)
- Fatoumata Sylla (2004-2007) [1st female]
- Maharafa Traoré (2007-2012)
- Malick Coulibaly (2012-2013)
- Mohamed Aly Bathily (2013-2015)
- Mahamadou Diarra (2015-2016)
- Sanogo Aminata Mallé (2015-2016)
- Mamadou Ismaïla Konate (2016-2017)
- Hamidou Younoussa Maiga (2018)
- Mohamed Sidda Dicko (5 October 2020- 24 May 2021)
- Boubacar Sidiki Samaké (24 May 2021 - )

== See also ==
- Justice ministry
- Politics of Mali
