= Emmanuel Wasswa =

Ugandan footballer (born 1993)

Personal information
- Full name: Emmanuel Alex Wasswa
- Date of birth: 3 January 1993 (age 33)
- Height: 1.85 m (6 ft 1 in)
- Position: Midfielder

Team information
- Current team: KCCA FC

Youth career
- Nkumba University
- Ndejje University

Senior career*
Years	Team	Apps	(Gls)
2021	SC Villa		
2021–2023	KCCA FC		
2023–2024	→ Express FC (loan)	13	(4)
2024-Present	KCCA FC		
- * Club domestic league appearances and goals as of 2 September 2025

Emmanuel Alex Wasswa (born 3 January 1993) is a Ugandan professional footballer who plays as a midfielder for KCCA FC in the Uganda Premier League and the Uganda national football team.

== Early life and education ==
Wasswa began playing competitive football while at Nkumba University and Ndejje University. He earned a Master’s degree in Procurement and Logistics Management from Nkumba University in October 2023, underscoring his commitment to education alongside his football career.

== Club career ==
=== SC Villa ===
Wasswa played for SC Villa during 2021 before joining KCCA FC.

=== KCCA FC ===
In July 2021, he signed a three-year contract with KCCA FC. Soon after joining, he suffered a ruptured anterior cruciate ligament during pre-season and underwent surgery at Nsambya Hospital.

=== Loan to Express FC ===
In August 2023, Wasswa moved on loan to Express FC for the 2023–24 Uganda Premier League season, with a recall option after the first round. He featured in 13 league matches, scoring four goals and providing two assists, and occasionally captained the side. He also netted in a 1–1 draw against UPDF FC.

=== Return to KCCA ===
KCCA FC recalled Wasswa in January 2024. He posted a heartfelt thank-you to the Express supporters for their support during his loan spell.

=== Later performances ===
In December 2024, Wasswa scored the decisive goal for Express FC in a 1–0 Kampala derby win against KCCA FC.

== Style of play ==
Operating primarily as a central or defensive midfielder, Wasswa is esteemed for his tactical intelligence, leadership, and industrious playing style.

== Personal life ==
Wasswa is notable for prioritizing his academic achievements earning a Master’s degree in 2023 while maintaining his football career.

== Career statistics ==
=== Club ===
As of 2 September 2025

Season	Club	League	Apps	Goals
2021	SC Villa	Uganda Premier League		
2021–22	KCCA FC	Uganda Premier League		
2022–23	KCCA FC	Uganda Premier League		
2023–24	→ Express FC (loan)	Uganda Premier League	13	4
2024–25	KCCA FC	Uganda Premier League		
Total			13+	4+

== See also ==
- Reagan Mpande
- Allan Okello
- Denis Omedi
