= Ashraf Mandela =

Ugandan footballer (born 2002)

Personal information
- Full name: Ashraf Mandela
- Date of birth: December 20, 2002 (age 23)
- Place of birth: Uganda
- Height: 1.78 m (5 ft 10 in)
- Position: Right-back

Team information
- Current team: Vipers SC

Youth career
- St Mary’s Secondary School, Kitende

Senior career*
Years	Team	Apps	(Gls)
–2015	Vipers SC		
2018–2019	SC Villa		
2019–2022	URA FC		
2022–2024	Vipers SC		
2024–2025	Police FC (Rwanda)		
2025–Present	Vipers SC		
- * Club domestic league appearances and goals

Ashraf Mandela (born 20 December 2002) is a Ugandan professional footballer who plays as a defender for Vipers SC in the Uganda Premier League.

== Early life ==
Mandela studied at St Mary’s Secondary School, Kitende, where he played football and developed through the school’s feeder programme for Vipers SC.

== Club career ==
Mandela began his career with Vipers SC, progressing through the youth system. In 2018, he signed for SC Villa, spending one season before joining URA FC, where he played for three years.

In July 2022, Mandela returned to Vipers SC on a two-year deal, contributing to the club’s successes including league and cup titles and qualification for the group stages of the CAF Champions League.

For the 2024–25 season, he joined Rwanda Police FC in the Rwanda Premier League. In September 2025, Mandela rejoined Vipers SC for a third spell, signing a three-year contract.

== Playing style ==
Mandela is mainly deployed as a right-back, noted for his defensive solidity and ability to contribute offensively when needed.

== Honours ==
=== Vipers SC ===
- Uganda Premier League: 2022–23, 2023–24
- Uganda Cup: 2023

== See also ==
- Ogama Baden Mujahid
- Allan Okello
- Reagan Mpande
