= Ivan Ahimbisibwe =

Ugandan footballer

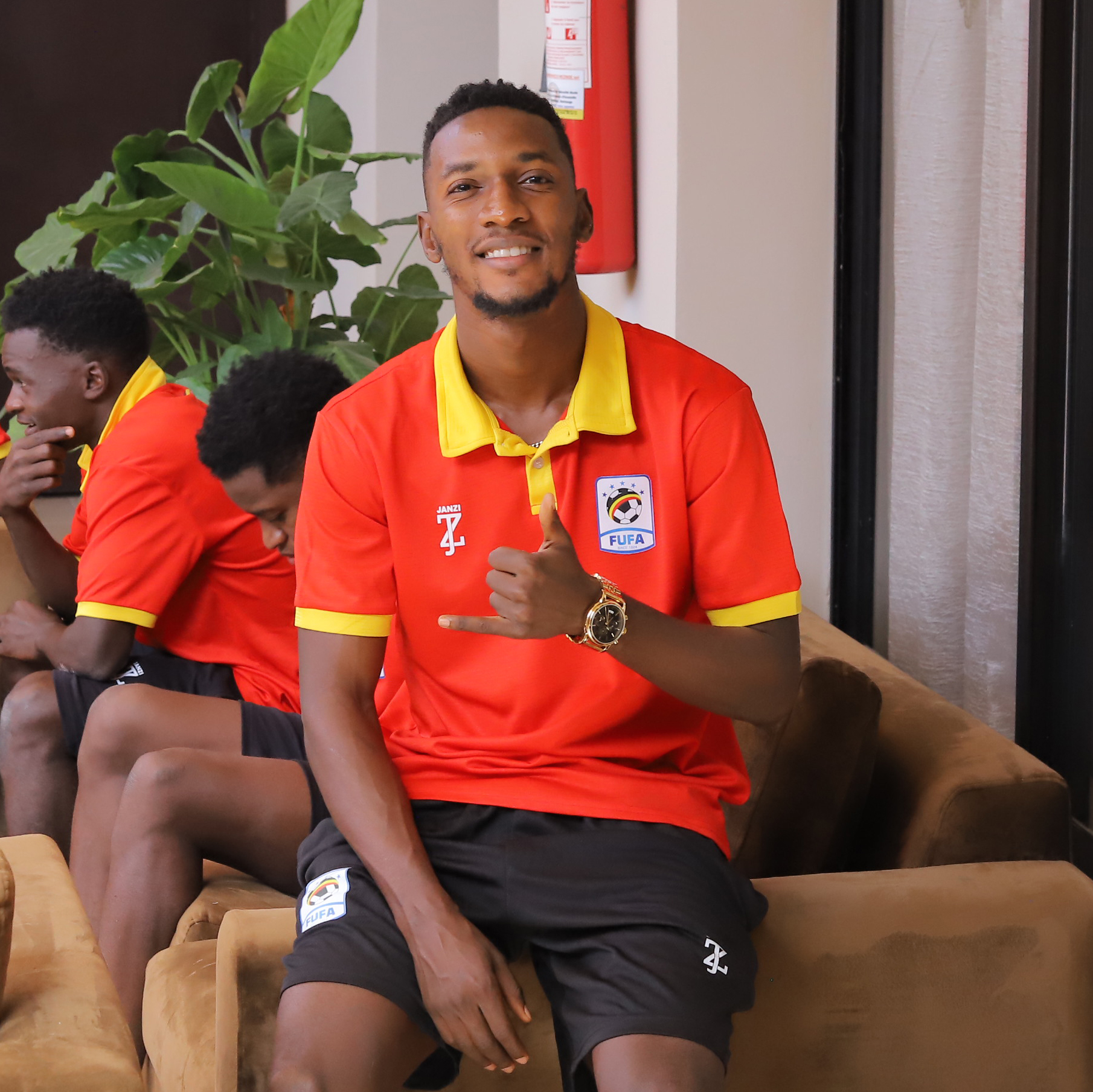
- Ahimbisibwe in 2025

Personal information
- Full name: Ivan Ahimbisibwe
- Date of birth: March 18, 2000 (age 26)
- Place of birth: Mbarara, Uganda
- Position: Forward

Team information
- Current team: Zakho SC

Youth career
- Mbarara Sports Academy

Senior career*
Years	Team	Apps	(Gls)
2017–2019	Synergy FC		
2019–2020	Nyamityobora FC		
2020–2022	UPDF FC		(22)
2023–2025	URA FC	35	(16)
2025–2026	KCCA FC	27	(14)
2026-	Zakho SC		

International career
	Uganda	0	(0)
- * Club domestic league appearances and goals

Ivan Ahimbisibwe (born 18 March 2000) is a Ugandan professional footballer who plays as a forward for Zakho SC in the Iraqi Stars League and the Uganda national football team.

== Early life and education ==
Ahimbisibwe was born in Kacence Village, Mbarara Uganda. He attended Mbarara Modern Primary School and Uganda Martyrs Primary before completing O-Level at Nyakayojo Secondary School and A-Level at St. Andrew's Secondary School in Rubindi. He later earned a degree in Social Work and Social Administration.

== Club career ==
=== Youth career ===
He began his football journey with the Mbarara Sports Academy, run by Salim Branden, from 2010 to 2015. The academy also produced players such as Kondok Junior, Brian Aheebwa, and Clinton Kamugisha.

=== Synergy FC ===
Ahimbisibwe was spotted by coach Brian Ssenyondo and joined Synergy FC, playing in Uganda's Big League for two and a half seasons. He scored 18 goals in his first season, 15 in the second, and 8 in half a season before leaving.

=== Nyamityobora FC ===
He joined Nyamityobora FC in Mbarara while pursuing his studies at university, scoring 15 goals in his debut season.

=== UPDF FC ===
Reuniting with coach Brian Ssenyondo, Ahimbisibwe signed for UPDF FC, scoring 22 goals across two seasons. He scored a hat-trick on his debut and was named MVP in his final campaign at the club.

=== URA FC ===
In August 2023, Ahimbisibwe signed a two-year contract with URA SC. During the 2024–25 season, he scored 16 league goals, finishing three behind Golden Boot winner Allan Okello.

=== KCCA FC ===
On 1 July 2025, KCCA FC announced Ahimbisibwe as their first signing of the transfer window, reuniting him with coach Brian Ssenyondo. At KCCA FC, he managed 14 goals and 3 assists in 27 appearances.

=== Zakho SC ===
In June 2026, Ahimbisibwe joined Iraqi professional club Zakho SC from KCCA FC.

== Honours ==
=== Individual ===
- UPDF FC MVP: 2022–23
- URA FC – Uganda Cup joint top scorer: 2024
- KCCA FC - UPL league Top scorer 2025/26.

== See also ==
- Allan Okello
- Reagan Mpande
- Denis Omedi
