= Mohamed Sidda Dicko =

Malian politician

Mohamed Sidda Dicko is a Malian politician. He is the Minister of Justice of Mali since October 2020. He is also the President of OHADA since February 2021.

Since December 2020, he is suspected of illegally ordering the arbitrary detention of 7 high-profile individuals to enable the new military-led government to instrumentalize key Malian companies for corruption purposes.

== See also ==
- Ministry of Justice (Mali)
- Politics of Mali
