= Ahmed El Moctar =

Mauritanian footballer

Personal information
- Full name: Ahmed El Moctar Ahmed
- Date of birth: 15 November 2003 (age 22)
- Place of birth: Mauritania
- Position: Forward

Team information
- Current team: Tevragh-Zeina
- Number: 14

Senior career*
Years	Team	Apps	(Gls)
2023–	Tevragh-Zeina	48	(31)

International career^{‡}
2024–	Mauritania	8	(1)
- * Club domestic league appearances and goals as of 22:41, 27 April 2026 (UTC) ‡ National team caps and goals as of 16:41, 25 November 2025 (UTC)

Ahmed El Moctar Ahmed, also known as Ahmed El Mokhtar, Ahmed Ahmed, and Ahmed Moctar, (born 15 November 2003) is a Mauritanian professional footballer who plays as a forward for Mauritanian Premier League club Tevragh-Zeina and the Mauritania national team.

== Club career ==
El Moctar plays his club football for Mauritanian Premier League club Tevragh-Zeina and he has played for the club since 2023. He scored his first goal for the club during the 3–0 win against ASC Entou on 10 December 2023.

Alongside Cheikhna Semega, El Moctar was the joint top goalscorer in the 2024–25 Super D1 season with 13 goals across 27 matches, missing only one match due to a minor injury.

During the 2025–26 season, he had a loan move to Egyptian Premier League club ENPPI rejected by Tevragh-Zeina. He scored a hat trick during the 4–0 victory against ASC Police on 17 February 2026, and he scored another hat trick during the 3–0 victory against Inter Nouakchott on 5 April 2026.

== International career ==
=== Mauritania ===
He debuted for Mauritania during the 1–0 win against Mali on 22 December 2024 during the 2024 African Nations Championship qualification.

El Moctar received a call up to the Mauritania national team for a set of friendly matches against the Central African Republic and Burundi in July 2025. He made one appearance for Mauritania on 10 July 2025 during the 0–0 draw against Burundi.

He has also been included in the Mauritania squad for the 2024 African Nations Championship, where he scored his first goal against Central African Republic on 9 August 2025.

He was in the Mauritania squad for the 2025 FIFA Arab Cup and played the 2–0 loss against Kuwait in the qualifying round on 25 November 2025 as Mauritania failed to qualify for the competition.

== Career statistics ==
=== Club ===
As of match played 17 April 2026

Appearances and goals by club, season and competition
Club	Season	League			Mauritanian President's Cup		Total	
Club	Season	Division	Apps	Goals	Apps	Goals	Apps	Goals
Tevragh-Zeina	2023–24	Mauritanian Premier League	3	3	?	?	3	3
Tevragh-Zeina	2024–25	Mauritanian Premier League	27	13	?	?	27	13
Tevragh-Zeina	2025–26	Mauritanian Premier League	18	15	1	1	19	16
Career total			48	31	1	1	49	32

=== International ===
As of match played 25 November 2025.

Appearances and goals by national team and year
National team	Year	Apps	Goals
Mauritania	2024	2	0
Mauritania	2025	6	1
Total		8	1

List of international goals scored by Ahmed El Moctar
No.	Date	Venue	Cap	Opponent	Score	Result	Competition	Ref.
1.	9 August 2025	Benjamin Mkapa Stadium, Dar es Salaam, Tanzania	6	Central African Republic	1–0	1–0	2024 African Nations Championship	

== Honours ==
Tevragh-Zeina

- Super D1: third place 2023–24
- Mauritanian President's Cup: runner-up 2023–24

Individual

- Super D1 top goalscorer (shared): 2024–25 (Note: Joint with Cheikhna Semega (ADK Moderne Kaédi).)
