= Sabir Bougrine =

Moroccan footballer

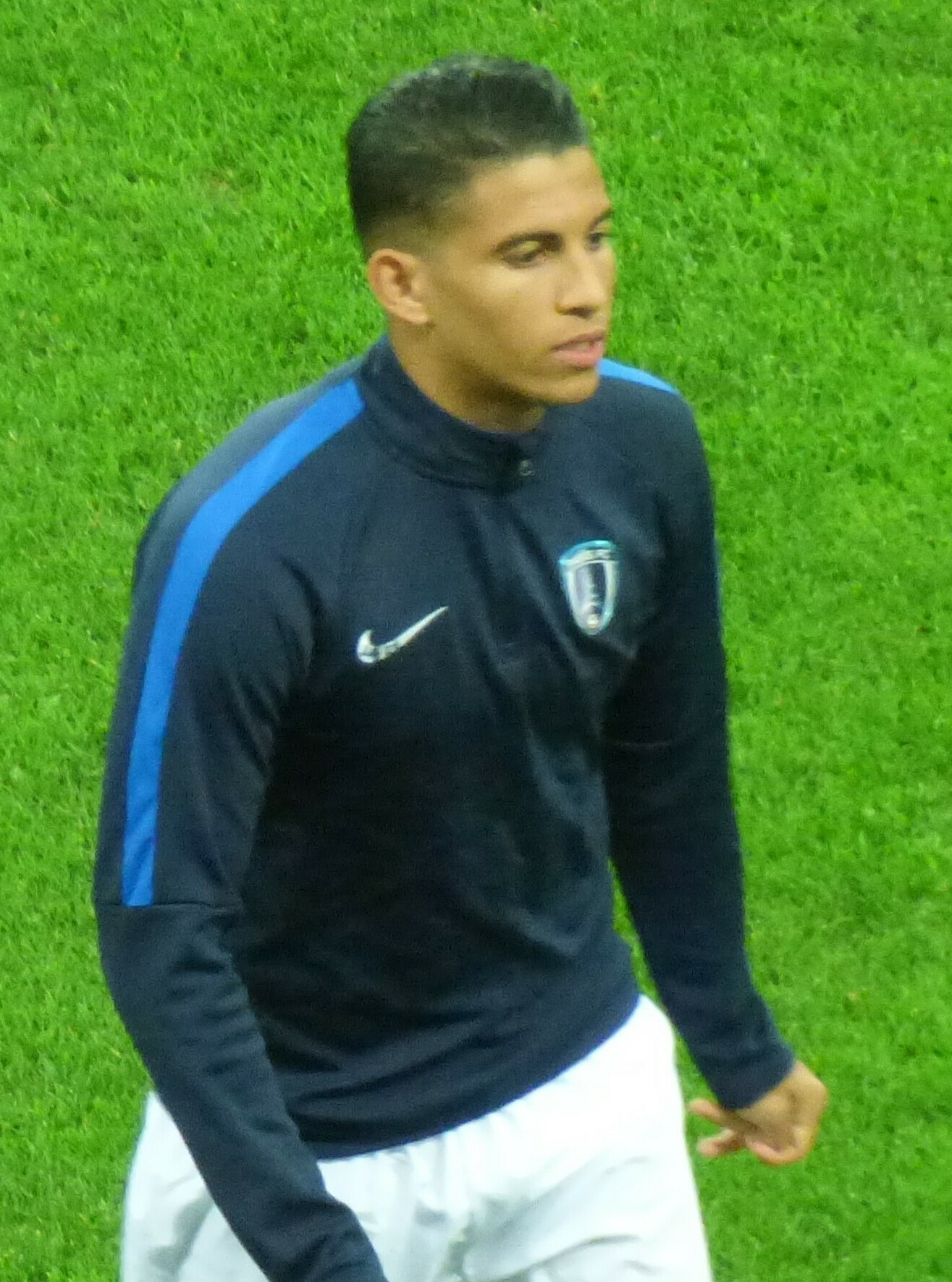
- Bougrine in 2018

Personal information
- Full name: Sabir Bougrine
- Date of birth: 10 July 1996 (age 30)
- Place of birth: Mechelen, Belgium
- Height: 1.74 m (5 ft 9 in)
- Position: Midfielder

Team information
- Current team: Raja CA
- Number: 34

Youth career
- 2009–2014: JMG Academy
- 2014–2015: Lierse

Senior career*
Years	Team	Apps	(Gls)
2015–2018	Lierse	76	(3)
2018–2019	Paris FC	4	(0)
2019–2020	Dudelange	10	(1)
2020–2022	Neftçi Baku	37	(4)
2022–2023	Espérance de Tunis	52	(4)
2023–	Raja CA	78	(5)

International career^{‡}
2014	Belgium U19	2	(0)
2016	Morocco U23	2	(0)
2025–	Morocco A'	6	(2)
Medal record
Men's football
Representing Morocco
African Nations Championship
Winner	2024 Kenya-Tanzania-Uganda
FIFA Arab Cup
Winner	2025 Qatar	Team
- * Club domestic league appearances and goals as of 5 February 2026 ‡ National team caps and goals as of 02:34, 27 August 2025 (UTC)

Sabir Bougrine (Arabic: صابر بوغرين; born 10 July 1996) is a professional footballer who plays as a midfielder for Botola side Raja CA and the Morocco national team.

== Club career ==
Bougrine joined the JMG Academy in Lierse in 2009, and moved to Lierse in 2014. Bougrine made his professional debut with Lierse in a 3–1 Belgian First Division A loss to Lommel SK on 25 May 2015. After a couple successful seasons in Lierse where he was one of the better players, Bougrine left the club due to financial difficulties the club had.

On 30 January 2018, Bougrine signed with Paris FC in the French Ligue 2.

On 18 July 2020, Bougrine signed a two-year contract with Azerbaijan Premier League side Neftçi PFK.

On 10 January 2022, Bougrine signed a three-year and half contract with Tunisian Ligue Professionnelle 1 minnows Espérance de Tunis.

== International career ==
Bougrine debuted for the Belgium national under-19 football team in a 0–0 tie with the Hungary U19s on 6 September 2014. He switched to represent Morocco, and represented the Morocco U23s in a friendly 1–0 win over the Cameroon U23s on 5 June 2016.

On 23 July 2025, he was announced among the list of players called up by Tarik Sektioui to take part in the 2024 African Nations Championship.

On 3 August 2025, the Atlas Lions began the group stage with a victory against Angola (2–0). However, they were surprisingly beaten by the host country, Kenya, by a score of 1–0. In a difficult situation, they bounced back against Zambia (goals from Hrimat, Lamlioui and Bougrine who opens his counter) and the DR Congo (goals from Hrimat and a brace from Lamliou). This success allowed the team to qualify for the quarter-finals where they eliminated the surprise of the tournament, Tanzania, by the narrowest of margins (1–0), in Dar es Salaam. In the semi-finals, the Moroccans faced the defending champions, Senegal. After a hard-fought match that ended 1–1 with a superb goal from Sabir Bougrine, Morocco won on penalties (5–3), thus reaching the final. On August 30, at the Nyayo National Stadium, the Atlas Lions won the title by beating Madagascar 3–2, thanks to a brace from Oussama Lamlioui.

== Honours ==
Morocco

- African Nations Championship: 2024
- FIFA Arab Cup: 2025

Raja CA

- Botola Pro: 2023–24
- Moroccan Throne Cup: 2022–23

Neftçi Baku

- Azerbaijan Premier League : 2020–21

Espérance de Tunis

- Tunisian Ligue Professionnelle 1: 2021–22
