= Caporal =

Caporal may refer to:

- Caporal, a type of strong dark tobacco
- Caporales, a Bolivian dance
- Caporal (military rank) in French, equivalent to Corporal
- Kaporal, Angolan footballer
