= Seyni Mbaye Ndiaye =

Senegalese footballer (born 2005)

Personal information
- Date of birth: 5 January 2005 (age 21)
- Place of birth: Dakar, Senegal
- Height: 1.90 m (6 ft 3 in)
- Position: Centre-back

Team information
- Current team: Celta B
- Number: 22

Youth career
- Gorée

Senior career*
Years	Team	Apps	(Gls)
2022–2025	Gorée		
2025–	Celta B	9	(0)

International career
2025–	Senegal A'	7	(1)
- * Club domestic league appearances and goals as of 25 May 2026

Seyni Mbaye Ndiaye (born 5 January 2005) is a Senegalese professional footballer who plays as a centre-back for Segunda División club Celta Fortuna.

== Club career ==
Born in Dakar, Mbaye Ndiaye began his career with US Gorée, where he impressed during the 2024–25 Ligue 1 and was named in the Team of the Season. On 1 September 2025, he moved abroad and joined La Liga side Celta de Vigo on a four-year contract, being initially assigned to the reserves in Primera Federación.

== International career ==
In July 2025, Mbaye Ndiaye was included in Souleymane Diallo's Senegal A's 25-man squad for the 2024 African Nations Championship. He was an undisputed starter during the competition, playing in all six matches, being named man of the match in the quarter-finals against Uganda and scoring the equalizer in the third place match against Sudan as Senegal went on to finish third.

On 7 September 2025, Mbaye Ndiaye was called up to the full side for a 2026 FIFA World Cup qualifiers match against DR Congo.
