= Leonard Ngenge =

Nigerian footballer (born 2007)

Personal information
- Full name: Leonard Chukwudalu Ngenge
- Date of birth: 12 September 2007 (age 19)
- Height: 1.88 m (6 ft 2 in)
- Position: Defender

Team information
- Current team: Leeds United

Senior career*
Years	Team	Apps	(Gls)
2024–2025	Ikorodu City	25	(1)
2025–2026	Remo Stars	4	(0)
2026–	Leeds United	0	(0)

International career^{‡}
2025–	Nigeria	2	(0)
- * Club domestic league appearances and goals as of 14:54, 20 January 2026 (UTC) ‡ National team caps and goals as of 14:54, 20 January 2026 (UTC)

Leonard Ngenge (born 12 September 2007) is a Nigerian professional footballer who plays as a defender for Premier League club Leeds United and the Nigeria national team.

== Club career ==
After playing in the Nigeria Premier Football League with Ikorodu City during the 2024–25 season, he transferred to Remo Stars for the 2025–26 season in August 2025. He scored on his debut for the club in a 4–0 CAF Champions League win over US Zilimadjou, and he made 7 appearances in all competitions for Remo Stars.

On 20 January 2026, Ngenge signed for Premier League club Leeds United's academy on an 18-month contract.

== International career ==
He made two appearances for Nigeria at the 2024 African Nations Championship in August 2025. In his second appearance for Nigeria, he scored an own goal and conceded a penalty in a 4–0 defeat to Sudan.
