= Alpha Onyango =

Kenyan footballer

Alpha Onyango is a Kenyan footballer who plays as midfielder for Kenyan Premier League side Gor Mahia, and the senior Kenya team.

Alpha featured for Kenya at the 2024 African Nations Championship held in Nairobi in August 2025 and emerged as the Most Valuable Player for the host Nation in the opener against DR Congo, and at the quarters against Madagascar.
