= Mamadou Ismaïla Konate =

Malian lawyer (born 1963)

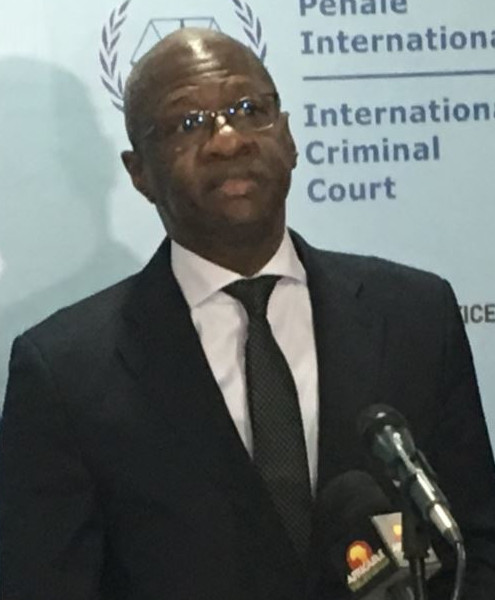

Malian Secretary of State for Justice
- In office 7 July 2016 – 27 November 2017

Personal details
- Born: Kayes, Mali
- Occupation: lawyer

Mamadou Ismaïla Konate (born 31 August 1963) is a Malian lawyer. He started his career at PricewaterhouseCoopers before creating his own firm in Bamako, Jurifis Consult, in 1998. On 7 July 2016 he was appointed Malian Secretary of State for Justice and took leave from the Paris and Bamako Bars and from his firm. He left office on 27 November 2017.

== Education ==
Born in Kayes, Mali, from a teacher mother and a high-ranking official father, Mamadou I. Konate is the firstborn of a five-child family. He studied in Mali until he graduated from high school. He then pursued his law studies at the University of Bordeaux, in France.

== As a lawyer ==
He won, in 1997, the eloquence contest of the Secretaries of the "Conférence du stage" of the Paris Bar, under the presidency of Dean Georges Vedel. He co-founded the same year the law firm Jurifis Consult.

As a member of both Bamako and Paris Bars, Mamadou I. Konaté has worked in Africa and in Europe.

He is involved in OHADA law and has published communications on the matter. He is also Secretary General of the Promotion of Arbitration in Africa Association (APAA). He is a member of the International Association of Lawyers and the European Association of Lawyers

== Secretary of State ==
On 7 July 2016, he was appointed Secretary of State for Justice and Human Rights ("Garde des Sceaux"), by the government of Modibo Keita. He was renewed 11 April 2017, as Secretary of State for Justice by Prime Minister Abdoulaye Idrissa Maïga

At the head of his Ministry, he initiated different projects in order to transform the Malian juridical system. He intended to simplify legal proceeding and to make it more accessible for litigants. He also intervened in topics of administrative corruption by setting up the Central Office for the Fight Against Illegal Enrichment that compelled public servants to disclose their assets. Regarding transitional justice, he took action in the Malian regions affected by the consequences of the 2012 crisis.

At an international level, he intervened in the cooperation between Sahelian States on matters of transnational criminality and terrorism, which resulted in the Mutual Legal Assistance and Extradition Convention, signed in May 2017, between Mali, Niger and Chad.
