= Rogers Torach =

Ugandan footballer

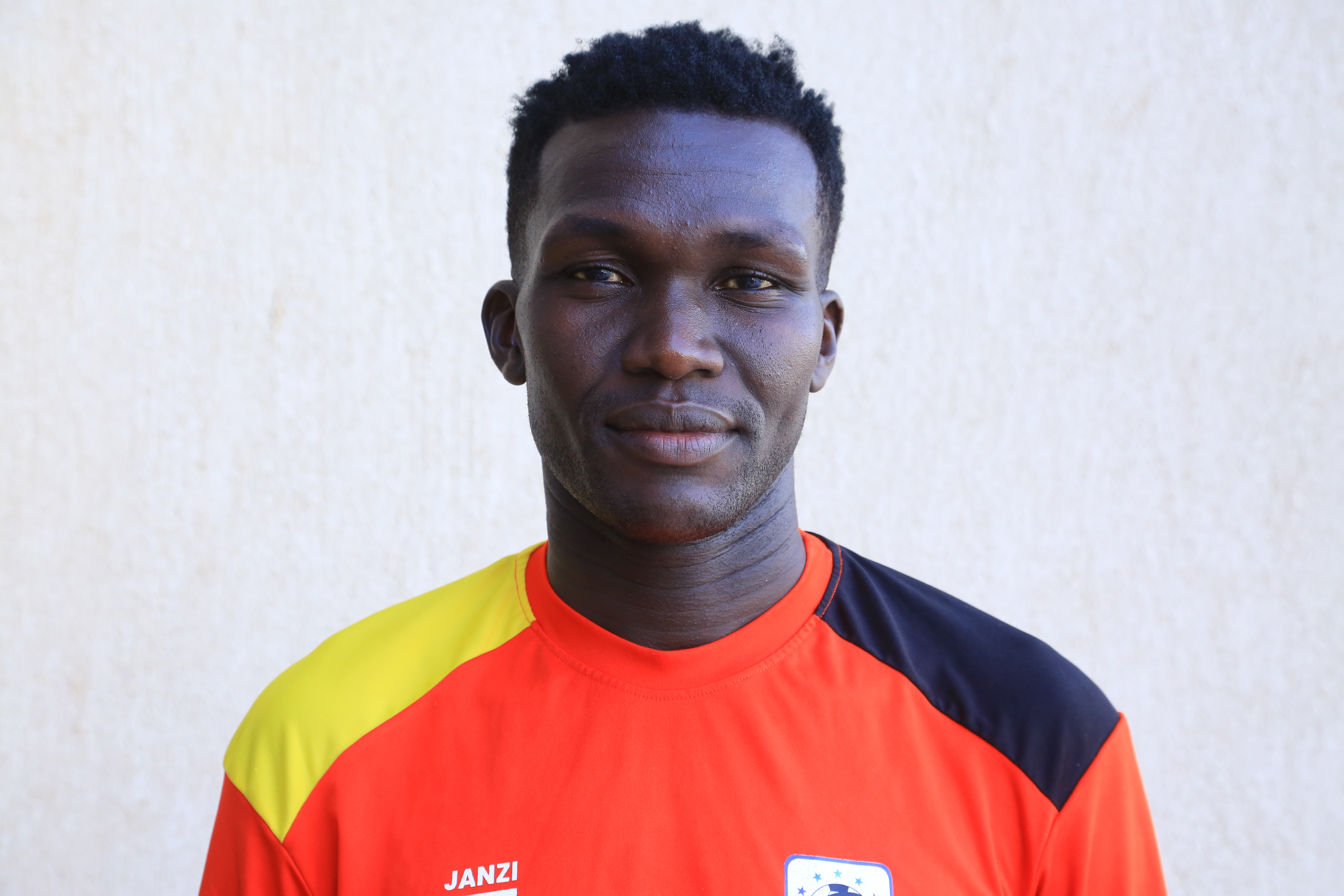

Personal information
- Full name: Rogers Ochaki Torach
- Date of birth: June 23, 2003 (age 23)
- Place of birth: Mayuge District, Uganda
- Height: 1.89 m (6 ft 2 in)
- Position: Defender

Team information
- Current team: CS Constantine
- Number: 24

Senior career*
Years	Team	Apps	(Gls)
2022–2026	Vipers SC	30	(1)
2026–	CS Constantine	1	(0)

International career^{‡}
2022–	Uganda U20		
2024–	Uganda	1	(0)
- * Club domestic league appearances and goals as of 5 September 2026 ‡ National team caps and goals as of 17 August 2025

Rogers Ochaki Torach (born 23 June 2003) is a Ugandan professional footballer who plays as a defender for CS Constantine in the Algerian Ligue Professionnelle 1 and the Uganda national football team.

== Club career ==
=== Vipers SC ===
Torach joined Vipers SC on 1 July 2022, he has made over 30 league appearances and scored 1 goal, establishing himself as a regular starter for the club.

=== CS Constantine ===
On 8 August 2026, he joined Algerian club CS Constantine.

== International career ==
Torach first represented the Uganda national football team at U-20 level, featuring in the U-20 African Cup of Nations qualifiers.

He made his senior international debut in 2024 and part of the squad for the 2024 African Nations Championship (CHAN).

At the 2023 African Games in Accra, Ghana, Torach played a key role in guiding the Uganda national footballs to a silver medal in men’s football.

On December 7, 2025, he was selected by Paul Put for Uganda's squad to participate in the 2025 Africa Cup of Nations.

== Honours ==
=== Uganda national football team ===
- African Games Silver medal: 2024

== See also ==
- Allan Okello
- Abdul Karim Watambala
- Reagan Mpande
- Vipers SC
- Uganda Cranes
