= Lalaïna Rafanomezantsoa =

Malagasy footballer (born 1998)

Lalaïna nomena Rafanomezantsoa
Personal information
- Full name: Nomena Lalaïna Rafanomezantsoa
- Date of birth: 10 March 2004 (age 22)
- Place of birth: [[toliara], Madagascar
- Height: 1.70 m (5 ft 7 in)
- Position: Central midfielder

Team information
- Current team: Paradou AC (on loan from CFF Andoharanofotsy)
- Number: 25

Senior career*
Years	Team	Apps	(Gls)
2019–	CFF Andoharanofotsy		
2025–	→ Paradou AC (loan)	7	(0)

International career^{‡}
2022–	Madagascar	38	(5)
- * Club domestic league appearances and goals as of 5 June 2026 ‡ National team caps and goals as of 23:59, 11 November 2025 (UTC)

Nomena Lalaïna Rafanomezantsoa (born 10 March 2004) is a Malagasy professional footballer who plays as a left winger for Algerian Ligue Professionnelle 1 club Paradou AC on loan from Malagasy Pro League club CFF Andoharanofotsy and the Madagascar national team.

== Club career ==
=== CFF Andoharanofotsy ===
Lalaïna Rafanomezantoa began his club career at Malagasy Pro League club CFF Andoharanofotsy, joining the club in 2019 at the age of 21. He won the 2021–22 Malagasy Pro League with CFF Andoharanofotsy.

He has previously participated in the qualifying rounds for both the 2021–22 CAF Confederation Cup and the 2022–23 CAF Champions League with CFF Andoharanofotsy.

==== Loan to Paradou AC ====
Ahead of the 2025–26 season, Rafanomezantaoa joined Algerian Ligue Professionnelle 1 club Paradou AC. He joined the club on loan on 31 August 2025 and debuted during the 3–1 loss against MC Oran on 27 September 2025.

== International career ==
Rafanomezantsoa made his debut for Madagascar on 12 July 2022 during a 2–0 defeat to Namibia during the COSAFA Cup quarter-finals. He scored his first goal for Madagascar during a 3–0 win against Sudan during the 2022 African Nations Championship on 23 January 2023.

He started the final of the 2023 Indian Ocean Island Games where Madagascar won 1–0 against Réunion.

He was included in the squad for the 2024 African Nations Championship, and he scored the winning goal against Burkina Faso on 17 August 2025 to ensure Madagascar has qualified to the knockout stage.

== Career statistics ==
=== International ===
As of match played 11 November 2025

Appearances and goals by national team and year
National team	Year	Apps	Goals
Madagascar	2022	4	0
Madagascar	2023	15	1
Madagascar	2024	5	0
Madagascar	2025	14	4
Total		38	5

As of match played 11 November 2025
Madagascar score listed first, score column indicates score after each Rafanomezantsoa goal

List of international goals scored by Lalaïna Rafanomezantsoa
No.	Date	Venue	Cap	Opponent	Score	Result	Competition
1	23 January 2023	Chahid Hamlaoui Stadium, Constantine, Algeria	6	Sudan	3–0	3–0	2022 African Nations Championship
2	19 March 2025	Larbi Zaouli Stadium, Casablanca, Morocco	25	Central African Republic	4–1	4–1	2026 FIFA World Cup qualification
3	9 June 2025	Dr. Petrus Molemela Stadium, Bloemfontein, South Africa	27	Eswatini	1–0	1–1	2025 COSAFA Cup
4	13 August 2025	Benjamin Mkapa Stadium, Dar es Salaam, Tanzania	30	Central African Republic	2–0	2–0	2024 African Nations Championship
5	17 August 2025	Amaan Stadium, Zanzibar City, Zanzibar, Tanzania	31	Burkina Faso	2–1	2–1	2024 African Nations Championship

== Honours ==
CFF Andoharanofotsy

- Malagasy Pro League: 2021–22

Madagascar

- African Nations Championship: runner-up 2024, third place 2022
- Indian Ocean Island Games: 2023
