= Bryne Odhiambo =

Kenyan footballer

Bryne Odhiambo Omondi is a Kenyan goalkeeper currently in the ranks of Kenyan Premier League side Gor Mahia, and the Kenya national football team.

Bryne formerly turned out for Tusker F.C., Agrochemical F.C., Posta Rangers, Mathare United, and KCB before joining Bandari.

He made his Kenya national team debut in June 2023 in an international friendly against Pakistan in Cote D’or National Sports Complex, Mauritius.
