= Melky Ndokomandji =

Central African Republic footballer

Personal information
- Full name: Melky-Jerede Ndokomandji
- Date of birth: 4 September 1997 (age 29)
- Place of birth: Bangui, Central African Republic
- Position: Midfielder

Team information
- Current team: Olympic Real

Senior career*
Years	Team	Apps	(Gls)
2017–	Olympic Real		

International career^{‡}
2021–	Central African Republic	2	(0)
- * Club domestic league appearances and goals as of 22:37, 1 September 2021 (UTC) ‡ National team caps and goals as of 22:37, 1 September 2021 (UTC)

Melky-Jerede Ndokomandji (born 4 September 1997) is a Central African footballer who plays as a midfielder for Olympic Real and the Central African Republic national team.

== International career ==
Ndokomandji debuted with the senior Central African Republic national team in a 1–0 2021 Africa Cup of Nations loss to Mauritania on 30 March 2021.
