= Alphonce Omija =

Kenyan footballer (born 2002)

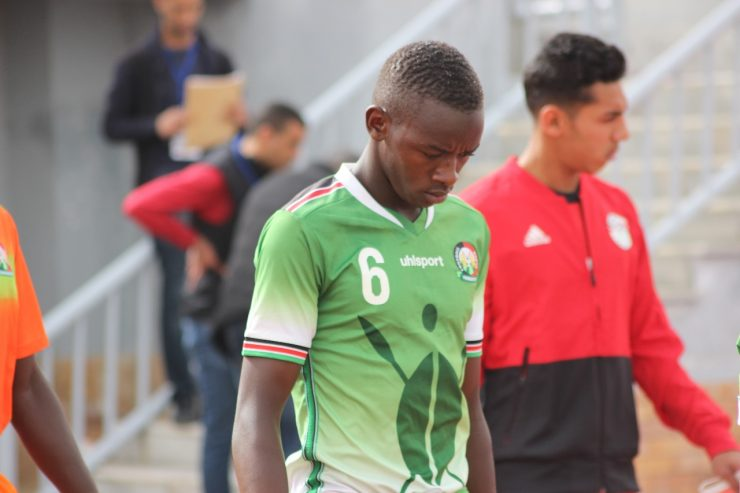
- Alphonce Omija Kenya U-17 UNAF tournament in Egypt

Personal information
- Full name: Alphonce Otieno Omija
- Date of birth: 9 October 2002 (age 24)
- Place of birth: Nairobi, Kenya
- Height: 1.85 m (6 ft 1 in)
- Position: Centre back

Senior career*
Years	Team	Apps	(Gls)
2019–2020	Gor Mahia	1	(0)
2020–2021	Kariobangi Sharks	20	(0)
2023–2024	Dhofar	19	(1)

International career^{‡}
2024–	Kenya	8	(1)
- * Club domestic league appearances and goals as of 24 May 2024 ‡ National team caps and goals as of 11 November 2026

Alphonce Otieno Omija (born 9 October 2002) is a Kenyan professional footballer who plays for the Kenya national team as a defender.

== International career ==
Omija made his debut for the Kenya national team on 11 June 2024 in a World Cup qualifier against the Ivory Coast at the Bingu National Stadium in Lilongwe, Malawi. He played the full game in a scoreless draw.

== Personal life ==
Omija studied at St John's Catholic School and later joined Baba Dogo Secondary School. He has stated that he looks up to defender Kalidou Koulibaly as a role model.

== Honours ==
=== Club ===
Gor Mahia

- Kenyan Premier League: 2019

Club	Season	League			Other		Total	
Club	Season	Division	Apps	Goals	Apps	Goals	Apps	Goals
GOR MAHIA	2019–20	KPL	1	0	—		1	0
GOR MAHIA	Total		1	0	0	0	1	1
Career total			1	0	0	0	1	1
