= Oumar Ba =

Physician and politician

Oumar Ba (1906 – 1964) was a physician and politician from Niger who served in the French Senate from 1948 to 1952. He was born in Bandiagara.
