= Kaporal =

Angolan footballer

Personal information
- Full name: João Chingando Manha
- Date of birth: 16 May 1994 (age 32)
- Place of birth: Benguela, Angola
- Position: Forward

Team information
- Current team: Al Ittihad Misurata SC
- Number: 3

Senior career*
Years	Team	Apps	(Gls)
2016–2017	Estrela Clube	32	(13)
2018–2019	Interclube	27	(6)
2019-2021	Wiliete S.C.	28	(11)
2021-2022	Kabuscorp	8	(4)
2022-2023	Academica de Lobito	21	(17)
2023-2024	Sagrada Esperança	9	(0)
2024-2025	Wiliete S.C.	28	(22)
2025-	Al Ittihad Misurata SC	11	(9)

International career^{‡}
2017–	Angola	12	(4)
- * Club domestic league appearances and goals as of 09:00, 2 August 2026 (UTC) ‡ National team caps and goals as of 12:34, 1 May 2026 (UTC)

João Chingando Manha (born 16 May 1994), commonly known as Kaporal, or Caporal, is an Angolan footballer who currently plays as a forward for Al Ittihad Misurata SC.

== Career statistics ==
=== Club ===
As of 5 April 2019.

Club	Season	League			Cup		Continental		Other		Total	
Club	Season	Division	Apps	Goals	Apps	Goals	Apps	Goals	Apps	Goals	Apps	Goals
Estrela Clube	2016	Girabola	8	1	0	0	–		0	0	8	1
Estrela Clube	2017	Girabola	24	12	4 (Note: Appearances in the Taça de Angola)	5	–		0	0	28	17
Estrela Clube	Total		32	13	4	5	0	0	0	0	36	18
Interclube	2018	Girabola	22	6	0	0	–		0	0	22	6
Interclube	2018–19	Girabola	5	0	0	0	–		0	0	5	0
Interclube	Total		27	6	0	0	0	0	0	0	27	6
Career total			59	19	4	5	0	0	0	0	63	24

=== International ===
As of matches played 13 June 2025

National team	Year	Apps	Goals
Angola	2017	1	0
Angola	2018	4	1
Angola	2019-2023	0	0
Angola	2024	2	1
Angola	2025	5	2
Total		12	4

=== International goals ===
Scores and results list Angola's goal tally first.

No	Date	Venue	Opponent	Score	Result	Competition
1.	28 May 2018	Peter Mokaba Stadium, Polokwane, South Africa	Botswana	1–2	1–2	2018 COSAFA Cup
2.	21 December 2024	Moses Mobhida Stadium, Durban, South Africa	Lesotho	1-0	2-0	2024 African Nations Championship Qualification
3.	10 August 2025	Nyayo National Stadium, Nairobi, Kenya	Zambia	1–1	2–1	2024 African Nations Championship
4.	10 August 2025	Nyayo National Stadium, Nairobi, Kenya	Zambia	2-1	2–1	2024 African Nations Championship
