= El Mami Tetah =

Mauritanian footballer

Personal information
- Date of birth: 12 November 2001 (age 24)
- Place of birth: Teyarett, Mauritania
- Height: 1.70 m (5 ft 7 in)
- Position: Winger

Team information
- Current team: AS Douanes (Nouakchott)
- Number: 9

Senior career*
Years	Team	Apps	(Gls)
2018–2021	ACS Ksar		
2021–2024	Alanyaspor	1	(0)
2022–2024	→ Arda Kardzhali (loan)	50	(3)
2024–	AS Douanes (Nouakchott)	3	(0)

International career^{‡}
2021	Mauritania U20	7	(1)
2025–	Mauritania	5	(0)
- * Club domestic league appearances and goals as of 5 September 2024 ‡ National team caps and goals as of 13 August 2025 (UTC)

El Mami Tetah (born 12 November 2001) is a Mauritanian professional footballer who plays as a winger.

== Professional career ==
A youth product of the Mauritanian club ACS Ksar, Tetah transferred to the Turkish club Alanyaspor on 27 January 2021. He made his professional debut for Alanyaspor as a late sub in a 1–0 Süper Lig loss to Sivasspor on 4 December 2021.

== International career ==
Tetah represented the Mauritania U20s at the 2021 Africa U-20 Cup of Nations.
