= Abdoul Abass Guiro =

Burkinabé footballer

Personal information
- Date of birth: 19 October 1994 (age 32)
- Place of birth: Abidjan, Ivory Coast
- Height: 1.93 m (6 ft 4 in)
- Position: Midfielder

Senior career*
Years	Team	Apps	(Gls)
2013–2014	KOZAF		
2014–2016	Bobo Sport		
2016–2017	ASF Bobo Dioulasso		
2017–2019	Étoile Filante		
2019–2021	Raja Beni Mellal	17	(0)
2022	Becamex Binh Duong	1	(0)

International career^{‡}
2017–2018	Burkina Faso	4	(0)
- * Club domestic league appearances and goals as of 11:44, 11 March 2022 (UTC) ‡ National team caps and goals as of 11:44, 11 March 2022 (UTC)

Abdoul Abass Guiro (born 19 October 1994) is a Burkinabé international footballer who plays for as a midfielder.

== Career ==
Born in Abidjan, Ivory Coast, he has played club football for KOZAF, Bobo Sport, ASF Bobo Dioulasso, Étoile Filante, Raja Beni Mellal and Becamex Binh Duong.

He made his international debut for Burkina Faso in 2017.
