= OHADA =

System of West and Central African corporate law institutions

OHADA (Organization for the Harmonization of Business Law in Africa) is a system of corporate law and implementing institutions adopted by seventeen West and Central African nations in 1993 in Port Louis, Mauritius before it was revised in 2008 in Quebec, Canada. OHADA is the acronym for the French "Organisation pour l'harmonisation en Afrique du droit des affaires", which translates into English as "Organisation for the Harmonisation of Corporate Law in Africa".

The OHADA Treaty is made up today of 17 African states. Initially fourteen African countries signed the treaty, with two countries (Comoros and Guinea) subsequently adhering to the treaty and a third (the Democratic Republic of Congo) joined on 12 September 2012. The Treaty is open to all states, whether or not they are members of the Organisation of African Unity. OHADA was created with the objective of fostering economic development in West and Central Africa by creating a better investment climate so as to attract investment in a 225 million-consumer market.

== Characteristics ==
As a West and Central African initiative to harmonize business laws and implementing institutions, OHADA aims to find alternative solutions to the lack of economic growth in sub-Saharan Africa - a region which has challenged and puzzled development economists for several decades. The stated purpose of the initiative is to facilitate and encourage both domestic and foreign investment in the member states, and as most of the participating countries are former French colonies, they draw chiefly on a modernised French legal model to achieve their goals. The laws promulgated by OHADA are exclusively business-related. The OHADA treaty has created a supranational court (Common Court of Justice and Arbitration of the Organization for the Harmonization in Africa of Business Law) to ensure uniformity and consistent legal interpretations across the member countries, and the French influence in court proceedings is apparent.

The most critical tool for legal integration is the Uniform Act. A uniform act is the recollection of all relevant legal norms needed to ease business in the Member States. As of today, OHADA includes nine validated Uniform Acts: General Commercial Law, Commercial Companies and Economic Interest Groups, Secured Transactions Law, Debt Resolution Law, Insolvency Law, Arbitration Law, Harmonization of Corporate Accounting, Contracts for the Carriage of Goods, Cooperatives Companies Law. Two Uniform Acts (Arbitration and Accounting) are currently being revised.

== Member States ==
Map of Africa with OHADA member states in green. Other states of sub-Saharan Africa are dark gray. The Democratic Republic of Congo, member state since 2012, is ir dark green.

- Benin
- Burkina Faso
- Cameroon
- Central African Republic
- Chad
- Comoros
- Côte d'Ivoire
- Democratic Republic of Congo
- Equatorial Guinea
- Gabon
- Guinea
- Guinea-Bissau
- Mali
- Niger
- Republic of the Congo
- Senegal
- Togo
