= Oussama Lamlioui =

Moroccan footballer

Personal information
- Date of birth: 2 January 1996 (age 30)
- Place of birth: Casablanca, Morocco
- Height: 1.80 m (5 ft 11 in)
- Position: Forward

Team information
- Current team: RS Berkane
- Number: 9

Youth career
- –2019: TAS de Casablanca

Senior career*
| Years | Team | Apps | (Gls) |
| 2019–2020 | TAS de Casablanca | 7 | (4) |
| 2020–2023 | SCC Mohammédia | 58 | (26) |
| 2023– | RS Berkane | 58 | (27) |

International career^{‡}
| 2025– | Morocco A' | 6 | (6) |
Medal record
Men's football
Representing Morocco
African Nations Championship
| Winner | 2024 Kenya-Tanzania-Uganda |
- * Club domestic league appearances and goals as of 9 August 2025 (UTC) ‡ National team caps and goals as of 12:40, 6 September 2025 (UTC)

Oussama Lamlioui (Arabic: أسامة المليوي; born 2 January 1996) is a Moroccan professional footballer who plays as a forward for RS Berkane and the Morocco A' team.

== Club career ==
Lamlioui started his career at TAS de Casablanca in Morocco. He made his professional debut in 2019, scoring a goal in the quarter-final of the Moroccan Throne Cup against IZ Khemisset in a 4–2 victory.

In the final of the 2019 Moroccan Throne Cup, he scored twice to secure a 2–1 win over Hassania Agadir.

On 13 November 2020, Lamlioui signed a two-year contract with SCC Mohammédia. He scored his first Botola Pro goal on 14 March 2021 against Ittihad Tanger in a 1–2 defeat.

On 11 April 2021, he scored twice in a 3–0 victory over Olympique Safi, before being substituted in the 74th minute. On 30 April 2021, he scored an early goal in a 1–1 draw against Wydad AC.

== International career ==
On 23 July 2025, Tarik Sektioui included Lamlioui in his 28-man squad for the 2024 African Nations Championship in Kenya, Tanzania, and Uganda to represent Morocco A'.

On 20 October 2025, Lamlioui was nominated for the 2025 CAF Player of the Year and Interclub Player of the Year awards at the CAF Awards.

== Career statistics ==
=== International ===
As of match played 30 August 2025

Appearances and goals by national team and year
| National team | Year | Apps | Goals |
|---|---|---|---|
| Morocco A' | 2025 | 6 | 6 |
| Total | | 6 | 6 |

Scores and results list Morocco's goal tally first, score column indicates score after each Lamlioui goal.

List of international goals scored by Oussama Lamlioui
| No. | Date | Venue | Opponent | Score | Result | Competition | Ref. |
|---|---|---|---|---|---|---|---|
| 1 | 14 August 2025 | Nyayo National Stadium, Nairobi, Kenya | Zambia | 2–0 | 3–1 | 2024 African Nations Championship | |
| 2 | 17 August 2025 | Nyayo National Stadium, Nairobi, Kenya | DR Congo | 1–0 | 3–1 | 2024 African Nations Championship | |
| 3 | 17 August 2025 | Nyayo National Stadium, Nairobi, Kenya | DR Congo | 3–1 | 3–1 | 2024 African Nations Championship | |
| 4 | 22 August 2025 | Benjamin Mkapa Stadium, Dar es Salaam, Tanzania | Tanzania | 1–0 | 1–0 | 2024 African Nations Championship | |
| 5 | 30 August 2025 | Moi International Sports Centre, Kasarani, Kenya | Madagascar | 2–1 | 3–2 | 2024 African Nations Championship | |
| 6 | 30 August 2025 | Moi International Sports Centre, Kasarani, Kenya | Madagascar | 3–2 | 3–2 | 2024 African Nations Championship | |

== Honours ==
TAS de Casablanca

- Moroccan Throne Cup: 2019

RS Berkane

- Botola Pro: 2024–25
- CAF Confederation Cup: 2024–25

Morocco Aʼ

- African Nations Championship: 2024

Individual

- Botola Pro Player of the Season: 2024–25
- CAF Confederation Cup Top Scorer: 2024–25
- African Nations Championship Golden Boot: 2024
