= Mohamed Rabie Hrimat =

Moroccan footballer

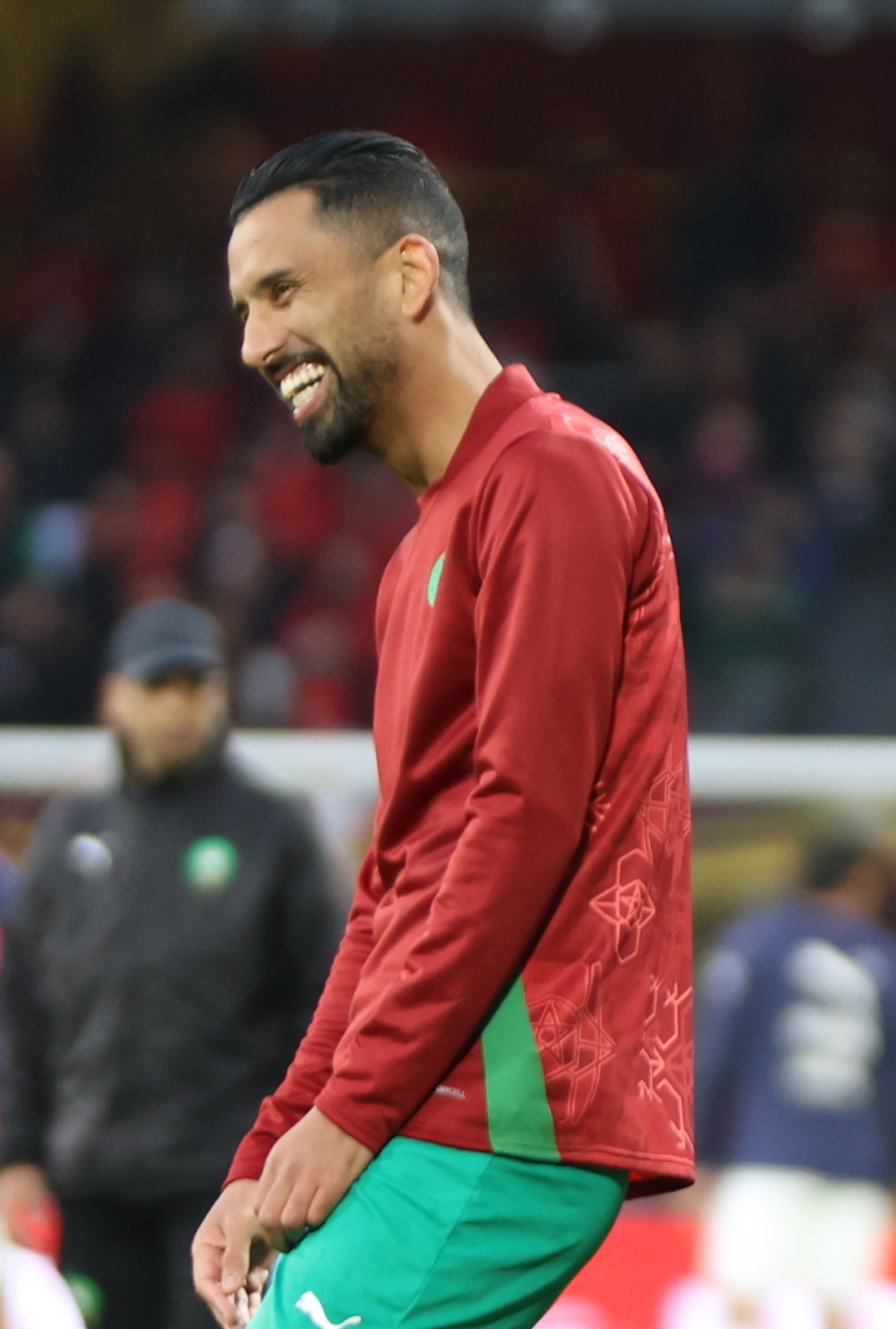
- Hrimat in 2026

Personal information
- Date of birth: 7 August 1994 (age 32)
- Place of birth: Rabat, Morocco
- Height: 1.86 m (6 ft 1 in)
- Position: Defensive midfielder

Senior career*
Years	Team	Apps	(Gls)
2014–2019	FUS Rabat	15	(0)
2015–2016	→ Union de Salé (loan)		
2019–2020	Kénitra AC	14	(0)
2020–2026	AS FAR	186	(28)

International career^{‡}
2021–	Morocco A'	13	(2)
2026–	Morocco	1	(0)
Medal record
Men's football
Representing Morocco
FIFA Arab Cup
Winner	2025 Qatar	Team
African Nations Championship
Winner	2024 Kenya-Tanzania-Uganda
- * Club domestic league appearances and goals as of 29 August 2024 ‡ National team caps and goals as of 19 March 2026

Mohamed Rabie Hrimat (Arabic: محمد ربيع حريمات; born 7 August 1994) is a Moroccan professional footballer who plays as an Defensive midfielder for the Morocco national team.

Hrimat represented the nation at the 2024 African Nations Championship and the 2025 FIFA Arab Cup.

== Club career ==
Hrimat came through the youth system at FUS Rabat, making his senior debut in the 2014–15 season. He played one league match before being loaned to Union de Salé in the Moroccan second division for the 2015–16 season.

Returning to FUS Rabat, he made thirteen appearances in the 2017–18 season, helping the club to a fourth-place league finish. In the 2018 Moroccan Throne Cup, the team was eliminated in the round of 16 by Difaâ Hassani El Jadidi.

On 13 September 2019, Hrimat signed a two-year contract with Kénitra AC, where he made fourteen appearances in the second division.

On 22 November 2020, he joined AS FAR on a three-year deal. On 14 May 2022, he won the Moroccan Throne Cup after a 3–0 victory over Moghreb Tétouan at the Adrar Stadium in Agadir.

== International career ==
On 5 June 2021, Hrimat was called up by coach Houcine Ammouta for a training camp with the Morocco A' ahead of the 2021 FIFA Arab Cup.

On 20 October 2025, Hrimat was nominated for the 2025 CAF Interclub Player of the Year award at the CAF Awards.

In 2025, Hrimat was part of the Moroccan squads that won the 2024 African Nations Championship and the 2025 FIFA Arab Cup, where he was named Player of the Tournament in both competitions.

On 19 March 2026, Hrimat was called up to the Morocco national football team by Mohamed Ouahbi, marking the realization of his lifelong dream. He expressed great pride in being selected, saying he had dreamed since childhood of wearing the national team jersey and was happy that moment had finally come true. He made his debut on 27 March in a 1–1 draw against Ecuador.

== Honours ==
AS FAR

- Botola Pro: 2022–23
- Moroccan Throne Cup: 2020–21
- CAF Champions League runner-up: 2025–26

Morocco A'

- African Nations Championship: 2024
- FIFA Arab Cup: 2025

Individual

- Botola Pro Player of the Season: 2023–24
- African Nations Championship Man of the Competition: 2024
- FIFA Arab Cup Golden Ball: 2025
