= Reagan Mpande =

Ugandan footballer

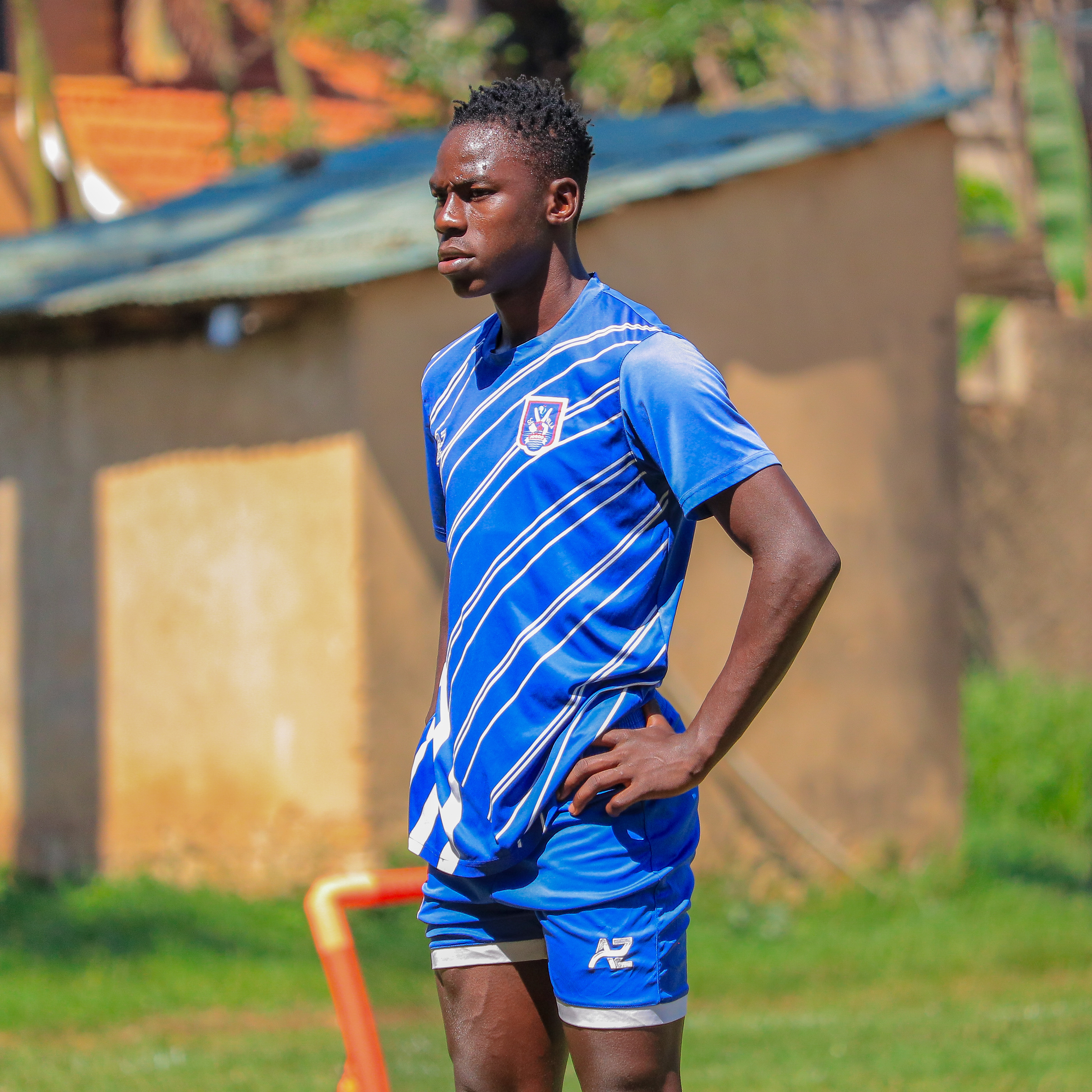
- Mpande in SC Villa training

Personal information
- Date of birth: 7 May 2000 (age 26)
- Position: Forward

Team information
- Current team: SC Villa
- Number: 5

Senior career*
Years	Team	Apps	(Gls)
2022–2024	Arua Hill	29	(10)
2024–2025	SC Villa	28	(3)

International career^{‡}
2025–	Uganda	3	(1)
- * Club domestic league appearances and goals as of 14:25, 14 August 2025 (UTC) ‡ National team caps and goals as of 14:25, 14 August 2025 (UTC)

Reagan Mpande (born 7 May 2000) is a Ugandan professional footballer who plays as a forward for the Uganda Premier League club SC Villa.

== Club career ==
=== Early career ===
Mpande began his football career in the FUFA Juniors League with Soana team that went ahead to win the trophy in the 2016-2017 season. He also held a leadership role at Bishops SS located in Mukono district as the Games Prefect in 2017-2018.

=== Arua Hills ===
He began his professional career at Arua Hills and played 29 games, scored 10 goals.

=== SC Villa ===
In 2024, Mpande joined SC Villa which plays in the Uganda Premier League making 28 appearances for the club with three goals.

== International career ==
Mpande has represented his country football team known as the Uganda national football team in the 2024 African Nations Championship in the opening match against Algeria, scored in his second match against Guinea in the 31st minute which was his first ever goal for the Uganda cranes.

On December 7, 2025, he was selected by Paul Put for Uganda's squad to participate in the 2025 Africa Cup of Nations.
