= Allan Okello =

Ugandan footballer (born 2000)

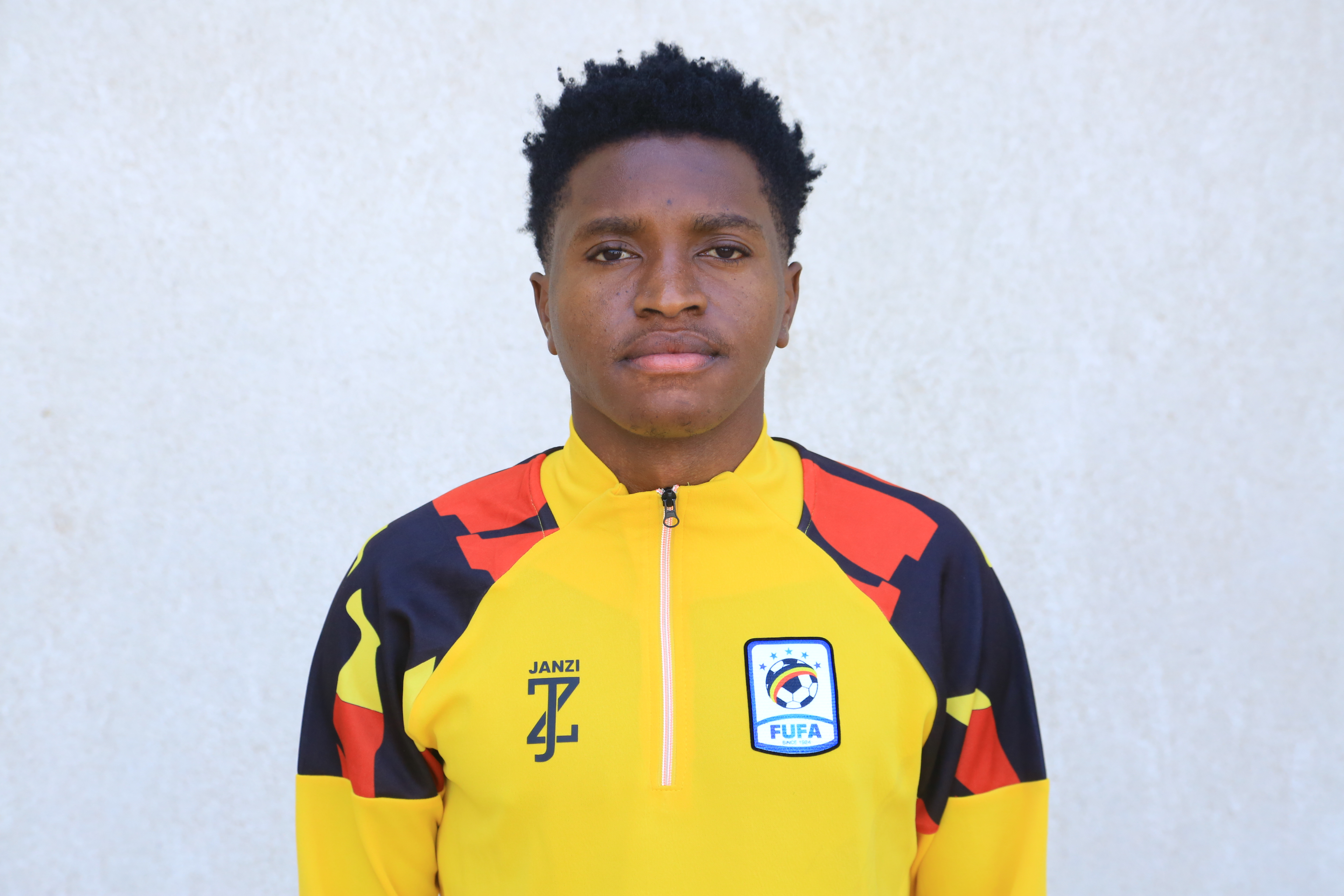
- Okello with Uganda in 2025

Personal information
- Date of birth: 4 July 2000 (age 26)
- Place of birth: Lira, Uganda
- Height: 1.70 m (5 ft 7 in)
- Position: Attacking midfielder

Team information
- Current team: AS FAR
- Number: 14

Senior career*
Years	Team	Apps	(Gls)
2017–2020	KCCA	68	(28)
2020–2023	Paradou	33	(3)
2022–2023	→ KCCA (loan)		
2023–2026	Vipers	29	(22)
2026	Young Africans	24	(14)
2026-	AS FAR	3	(0)

International career^{‡}
2017–	Uganda U20	7	(0)
2018–	Uganda U23	2	(1)
2019–	Uganda	35	(6)
- * Club domestic league appearances and goals as of 17:23, 03 November 2026 (UTC) ‡ National team caps and goals as of 20:00, 8 September 2025 (UTC)

Allan Okello (born 4 July 2000) is a Ugandan professional footballer who plays as a attacking midfielder for Moroccan club AS Far Rabat and the Uganda national team.

== Early life ==
Born and raised in Barr Subcounty, Lira district in Northern Uganda, Okello found his way to Kampala to study at the football power house Kibuli Secondary School following the death of his biological mother in 2012. Okello was born to Patrick Ojom (deceased) and Joan Agomu.

== Club career ==
=== KCCA ===
On 24 February 2017, Okello was unveiled at Kampala Capital City Authority's ground, Lugogo. Okello netted a hat trick and assisted one goal on his senior debut as Kampala Capital City Authority defeated Onduparaka FC 7–0 at Phillip Omondi stadium on 27 February 2017, thus becoming the first player to score a hat trick in the Uganda Premier League 2016–2017 season. In July 2017 while in his senior six at Kibuli Secondary School where he had spent six years from 2012, many professional clubs worldwide such as Mamelodi Sundowns, Amsterdamsche Football Club Ajax and Egyptian club Al Ahly Sporting Club showed interest in Okello. However, his agent, Isaac Mwesigwa confirmed tht "he will not leave the country until he has completed his A-level studies".

==== 2018–19 season ====
Okello played his first game of the season on 28 September, against Soana FC at Phillip Omondi StarTimes Stadium, Kampala Capital City Authority (won 2–1). He scored his first goal of the season against Onduparaka on 19 October at Green Light Stadium, Arua. Okello played his last game of the season against Maroons FC on 4 May 2019, at Phillip Omondi StarTimes Stadium. He played over 24 matches in the season. Kampala Capital City Authority became the league champions. Okello completed the 2018–2019 Uganda Premier League season with six goals.

=== Paradou ===
On 21 January 2020, Okello signed a four year contract with Paradou AC. which was supposed to last until 21 January 2024. Unfortunately, Allan's contract with Algerian Club was terminated by mutual agreement, that left him a free agent for a while.

==== Return to KCCA on loan ====
On 20 September 2022 after an agreement reached with Paradou, Okello signed a one-year loan contract with KCCA FC. He went on to play 14 games for the club winning 6 Man of the match awards.

=== Vipers ===
At the end of the season after KCCA failing to agree terms on a new contract, Okello made a controversial move to Vipers SC the rivals of his mother club after being approached by Club CEO Dr. Lawrence Mulindwa in a deal purportedly worth $30,000, the news made rounds all over social media platforms leaving many KCCA fans unhappy with the transfer.

=== Young Africans Soccer Club ===
Ugandan international and Vipers SC attacking midfielder Okello Allan completed moved to Tanzanian powerhouse Young Africans SC at transfer fees of $300,000 approximately one billion Uganda shillings, where he signed three years deal.

At Young Africans SC, Okello scored 14 goals and made 8 assists before leaving for AS FAR.

=== AS Far Rabat ===
Allan Okello transferred from Tanzanian club Young Africans SC where he played for only one season before joining Moroccan club AS FAR. Allan joined the Moroccan club on August 20, 2026 on a three year contract.

== International career ==
=== Under-20 ===
Okello played for Uganda U20 during the COSAFA U-20 Tournament which was held in Zambia in 2017. He made his debut on 6 December 2017, against Zambia U20 when he came in as a substitute replacing Pius Obuya at Arthur Davis Stadium, Kitwe.

=== Under-23 ===
Okello has played for Uganda U23 during the TOTAL AFCON U-23 Qualifiers. He made his debut on 14 November 2018, against South Sudan U23 at Star Times Stadium Lugogo, Uganda U23 won the game 1–0.

=== Senior ===
On 13 March 2019, Uganda head coach Sébastien Desabre invited Okello to be on the final team preparing for the final 2019 Afcon qualifying game against Tanzania. However he made his senior national team debut against Somalia.

On December 7, 2025, he was selected by Paul Put for Uganda's squad to participate in the 2025 Africa Cup of Nations.

== Career statistics ==
Scores and results list Uganda's goal tally first.

No.	Date	Venue	Opponent	Score	Result	Competition
1.	19 October 2019	StarTimes Stadium, Kampala, Uganda	Burundi	3–0	3–0	2020 African Nations Championship qualification
2.	9 December 2019	Lugogo Stadium, Kampala, Uganda	Somalia	1–0	2–0	2019 CECAFA Cup
3.	9 December 2019	Lugogo Stadium, Kampala, Uganda	Somalia	2–0	2–0	2019 CECAFA Cup
4.	25 March 2025	Mandela National Stadium, Kampala, Uganda	Guinea	1–0	1–0	2026 FIFA World Cup qualification
5.	5 September 2025	Mandela National Stadium, Kampala, Uganda	Mozambique	1–0	4–0	2026 FIFA World Cup qualification
6.	8 September 2025	Mandela National Stadium, Kampala, Uganda	Somalia	1–0	2–0	2026 FIFA World Cup qualification

== Honours ==
Lira Destiny Sports Academy

- Winner – ARS Northern Region: 2014

Kibuli S.S

- Champions Copa Coca-Cola: 2016
- National Post Primary Championship: 2014

KCCA FC

- Uganda Premier League: 2016–17, 2018–19
- Uganda Cup: 2016–17, 2017–18

Vipers SC

- Uganda Premier League: 2024-25
- Uganda Cup:2024-25

Individual

- Buzz Teeniez Awards Sports Personality of the Year 2019
- Airtel Rising Stars M.V.P: 2014, 2015, 2016
- Copa Coca-Cola M.V.P: 2016
- FUFA Junior League M.V.P: 2016
- Young Player of the Year: 2016–2017
- Airtel FUFA Best eleven: 2017–18
- Airtel FUFA fans' favourite player of the year: 2018
- Airtel Fufa Footballer of the year: 2019.
- Fortebet Real Stars Award: 2025.
- Uganda Premier League Golden Boot: 2024-2025 Season.
