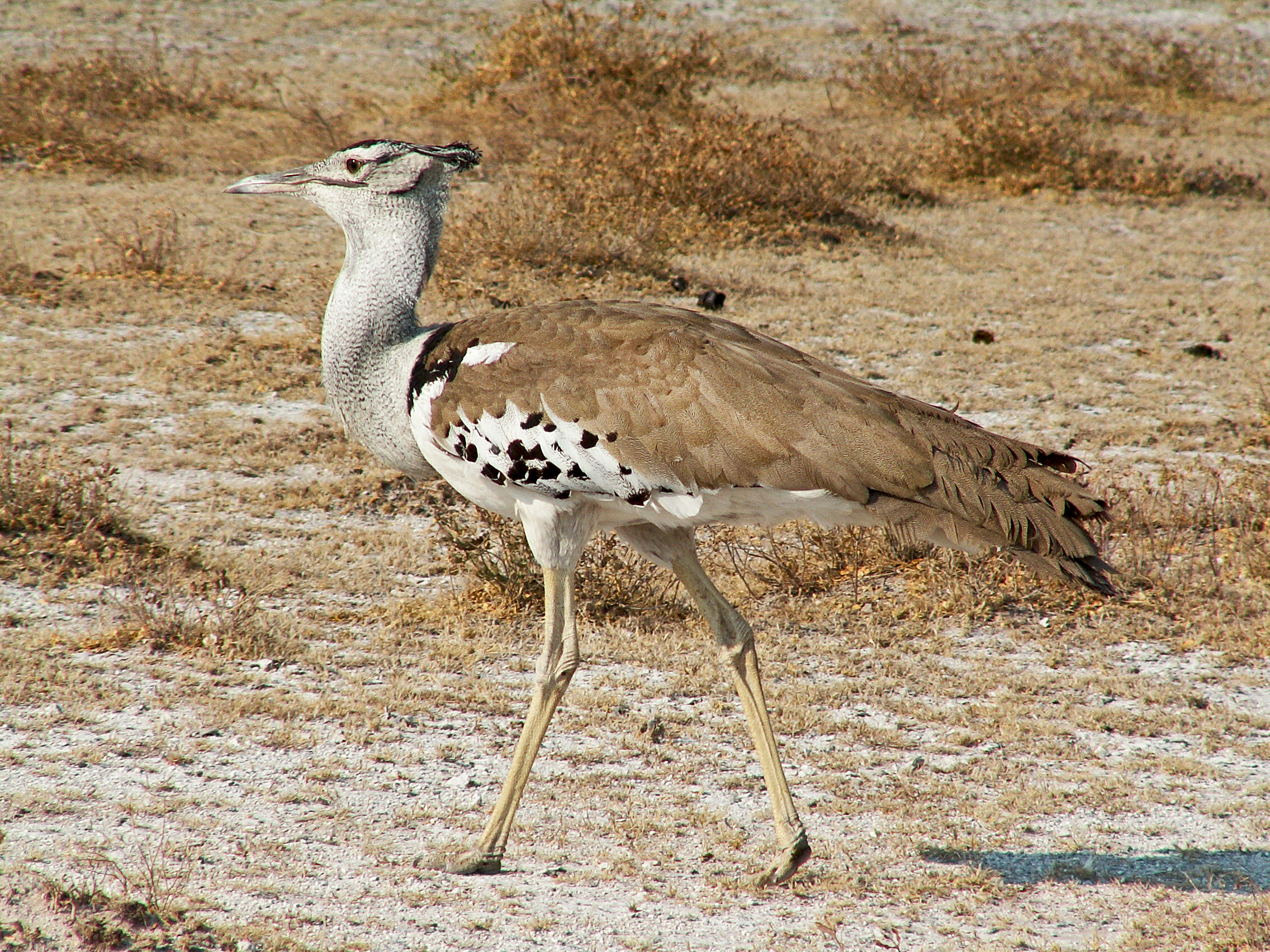
- Kori bustard (Ardeotis kori)

Scientific classification
- Kingdom: Animalia
- Phylum: Chordata
- Class: Aves
- Order: Otidiformes
- Family: Otididae
- Genus: Ardeotis; Le Maout, 1853

Type species
- Otis arabs (Arabian bustard) Linnaeus, 1758

= Ardeotis =

Genus of birds

Ardeotis is a genus of birds in the family Otididae.

The genus was described in 1853 by the French naturalist Emmanuel Le Maout to accommodate the Arabian bustard.

== Species ==
It contains the following species:

Genus Ardeotis – Le Maout, 1853 – four species
Common name	Scientific name and subspecies	Range	Size and ecology	IUCN status and estimated population
Arabian bustard	Ardeotis arabs (Linnaeus, 1758) Four subspecies: A. a. lynesi (Bannerman 1930) (Moroccan bustard); A. a. stieberi (Neumann 1907) (great Arabian bustard); A. a. arabs (Linnaeus 1758); A. a. butleri (Bannerman 1930) (Sudan bustard)	Algeria, Burkina Faso, Cameroon, Chad, Djibouti, Eritrea, Ethiopia, Guinea-Bissau, Iraq, Kenya, Mali, Mauritania, Morocco, Niger, Nigeria, Saudi Arabia, Senegal, Somalia, Sudan, and Yemen. It is a vagrant to Kenya, Gambia, northern Ivory Coast and northern Ghana.	Size: Habitat: Diet:	NT
Great Indian bustard	Ardeotis nigriceps (Vigors, 1831)	India and Pakistan	Size: Habitat: Diet:	CR
Australian bustard	Ardeotis australis (Gray, JE, 1829)	northern Australia and southern New Guinea	Size: Habitat: Diet:	LC
Kori bustard	Ardeotis kori (Burchell, 1822) Two subspecies: A. k. struthiunculus (Neumann 1907) (Northern Kori bustard); A. k. kori (Burchell 1822) (Southern Kori bustard)	Botswana and Namibia, extending into southern Angola and marginally into southwestern Zambia.	Size: Habitat: Diet:	NT
