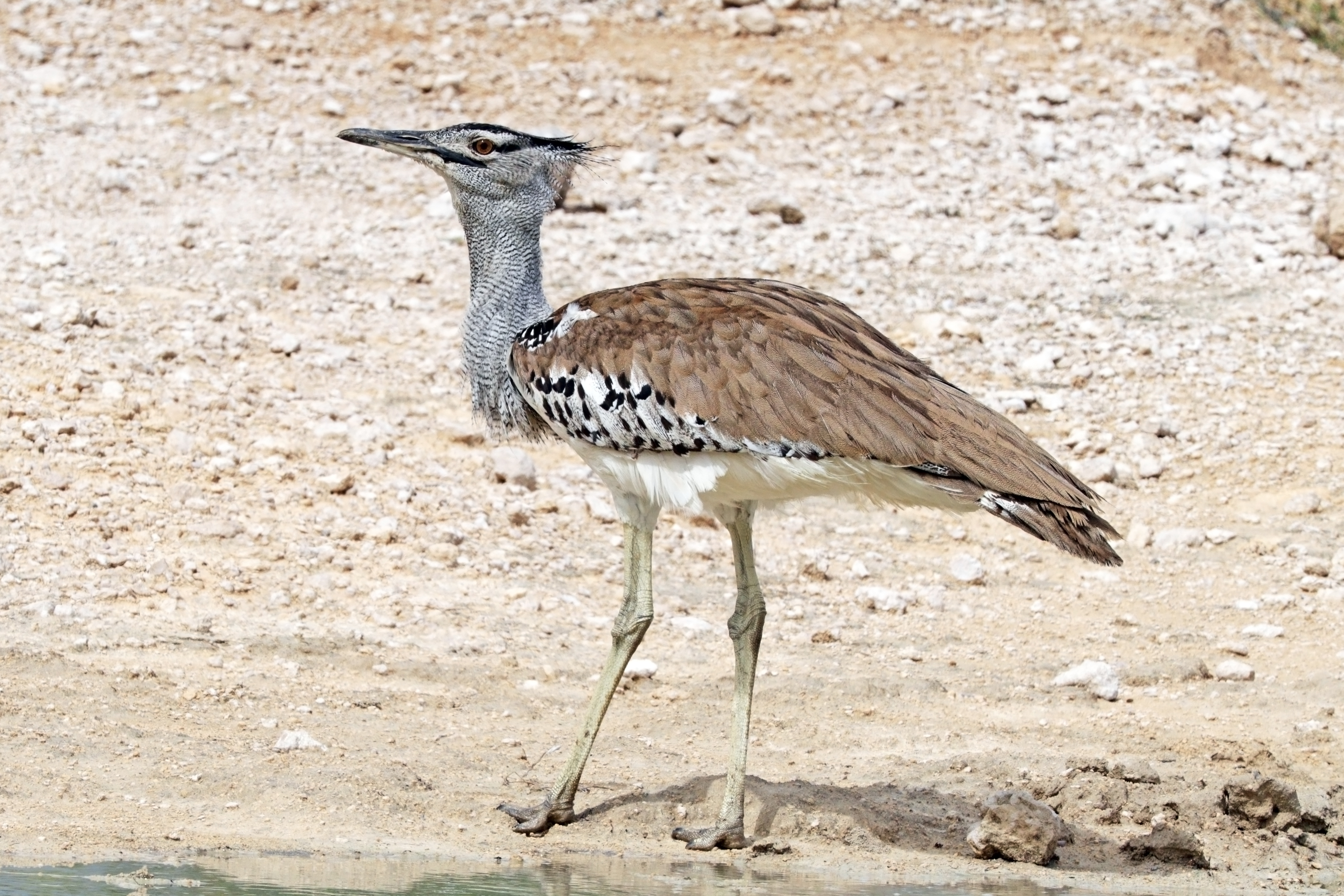
- Nominate subspecies, male, taken in Etosha National Park, Namibia

Conservation status
- Near Threatened (IUCN 3.1)
- CITES Appendix II

Scientific classification
- Kingdom: Animalia
- Phylum: Chordata
- Class: Aves
- Order: Otidiformes
- Family: Otididae
- Genus: Ardeotis
- Species: A. kori

Binomial name
- Ardeotis kori (Burchell, 1822)

= Kori bustard =

Species of bustard native to Africa

The kori bustard (Ardeotis kori) is the largest flying bird native to Africa. It is a member of the bustard family, which all belong to the order Otidiformes and are restricted in distribution to the Old World. It is one of the four species (ranging from Africa to India to Australia) in the large-bodied genus Ardeotis. The male kori bustard may be the heaviest living animal capable of flight.

This species, like most bustards, is a ground-dwelling bird and an opportunistic omnivore. Male kori bustards, which can be more than twice as heavy as the female, attempt to breed with as many females as possible and take no part in the raising of the young. The nest is a shallow hollow in the earth, often disguised by nearby obstructive objects such as trees.

== Taxonomy ==
English naturalist William John Burchell described the kori bustard in 1822. The specific epithet kori is derived from the Tswana name for this bird – Kgori.

Two subspecies are currently recognized:

- Ardeotis kori kori – the relatively pale nominate race from Botswana, Zimbabwe, Namibia, southern Angola, South Africa and Mozambique.
- Ardeotis kori struthiunculus – the "Somali kori" distributed in Ethiopia, Uganda, South Sudan, Kenya and Tanzania. The two races are separated by the miombo woodlands of central Africa. This race has a more boldly patterned head and slightly more black and white patterning on the wings. The two races are similar in size, though A. k. struthiunculus may be slightly larger. This may be a distinct species.

In older literature the species is named 'Large Crested Pauw' (Eupodotis kori).

== Description ==
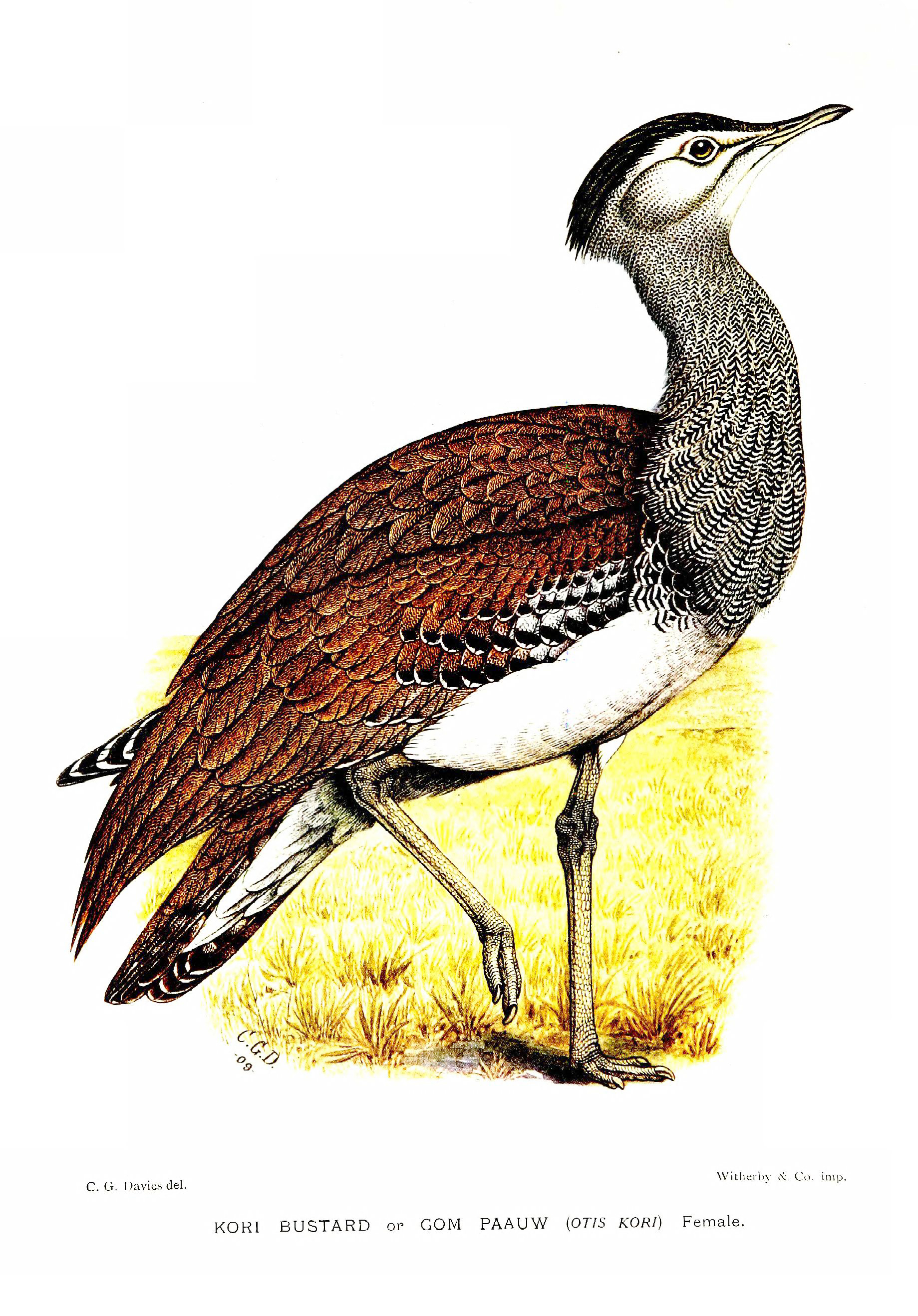
A C. G. Finch-Davies illustration (1912)

The kori bustard is cryptically coloured, being mostly grey and brown, finely patterned with black and white coloring. The upper parts and neck are a vermiculated black and greyish-buff colour. The ventral plumage is more boldly colored, with white, black and buff. The crest on its head is blackish in coloration, with less black on the female's crest. There is a white eye stripe above the eye. The chin, throat and neck are whitish with thin, fine black barring. A black collar at the base of the hind-neck extends onto the sides of the breast. The feathers around the neck are loose, giving the appearance of a thicker neck than they really have. The belly is white and the tail has broad bands of brownish-gray and white coloration. Their feathers contain light sensitive porphyrins, which gives their feathers a pinkish tinge at the base- especially noticeable when the feathers are shed suddenly. The head is large and the legs are relatively long. The eye is pale yellow, while the bill is light greenish horn coloured, relatively long, straight and rather flattened at the base. The legs are yellowish. The feet have three forward facing toes. Females are similar in plumage but are much smaller, measuring about 20–30% less in linear measurements and often weighing one third to half of the males. The female is visibly thinner legged and slimmer necked. The juvenile is similar in appearance to the female, but is browner with more spotting on the mantle, with shorter crest and neck plumes. Male juveniles are larger than females and can be the same overall size as the adult male but tends to be less bulky with a thinner neck, shorter head crest, paler eyes and a darker mantle.

=== Size ===
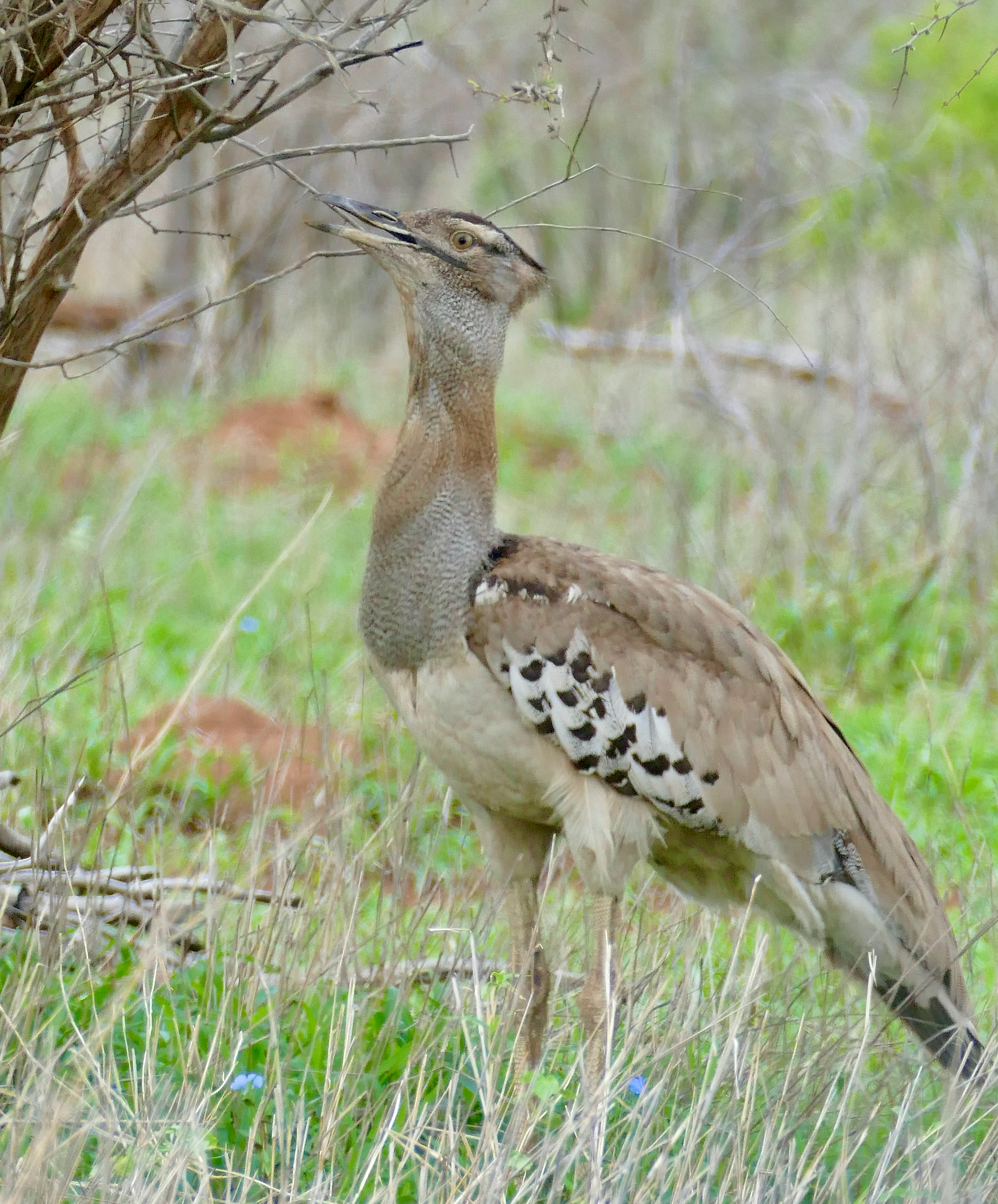
A kori bustard is tall enough to feed from shrubs and small trees from the ground.

The male kori bustard has a length of 105 to 135 cm (3 ft 5 in to 4 ft 5 in) and a wingspan of 230 to 275 cm (7 ft 7 in to 9 ft 0 in). Male birds may typically weigh between 7 and 18 kg (15 and 40 lb). The average weight of adult males of the nominate race in Namibia (20 specimens) was 11.3 kg (25 lb), while A. k. struthiunculus males were found to average 10.9 kg (24 lb). Males in Serengeti National Park had appreciably higher weights, however, averaging 12.2 kg (27 lb). The larger excepted males can scale up to 16 to 19 kg (35 to 42 lb) and a few exceptional specimens may weigh up to at least 20 kg (44 lb). Reports of outsized specimens weighing 23 kg (51 lb), 34 kg (75 lb) and even "almost" 40 kg (88 lb) have been reported, but none of these giant sizes have been verified and some may be from unreliable sources. Among bustards, only male great bustards (Otis tarda) achieve similarly high weights (the mean mass of males in these species is roughly the same) making the male kori and great not only the two largest bustards but also arguably the heaviest living flying animals, with the kori bustard being Africa's second largest bird after the ostrich. The larger males of certain other species, such as the Dalmatian pelican (Pelecanus crispus), Andean condor (Vultur gryphus) and trumpeter swan (Cygnus buccinator), might match the average weight of the largest bustards, and these species may weigh more on average than the giant bustards as they are less sexually dimorphic in mass. Other than a 23 kg (51 lb) mute swan (Cygnus olor), the maximum size of the large bustards exceeds that of other flying birds. Other flying African birds (excluding rare vagrant pelicans and vultures to northernmost Africa) rival the average weight between the sexes of Kori bustards, namely great white pelicans (Pelecanus onocrotalus) and Cape vultures (Gyps coprotheres) while wattled cranes (Bugeranus carunculatus) lag slightly behind these on average. The female kori bustard weighs an average of 4.8 to 6.1 kg (11 to 13 lb), with a full range of 3 to 7 kg (6.6 to 15.4 lb). Females of the nominate race (35 specimens) in Namibia weighed a mean of 5.62 kg (12.4 lb), while females from A. k. struthiunculus weighed a mean of 5.9 kg (13 lb). Females in the Serengeti averaged slightly lighter at 5.15 kg (11.4 lb). Female length is from 90 to 112 cm (2 ft 11 in to 3 ft 8 in) while their wingspan is around 177 to 220 cm (5 ft 10 in to 7 ft 3 in). The standard measurements of the male include a wing chord of 69.5 to 83 cm (27.4 to 32.7 in), a tail measures from 35.8–44.7 cm (14.1–17.6 in), a culmen from 9.5 to 12.4 cm (3.7 to 4.9 in) and a tarsus from 20 to 24.7 cm (7.9 to 9.7 in). Meanwhile, the female's standard measurements are a wing chord of 58.5 to 66.5 cm (23.0 to 26.2 in), a tail of 30.7 to 39.5 cm (12.1 to 15.6 in), a culmen from 7 to 10.4 cm (2.8 to 4.1 in) and a tarsus from 16 to 19.5 cm (6.3 to 7.7 in). Body mass can vary considerably based upon rain conditions.

=== Similar species ===
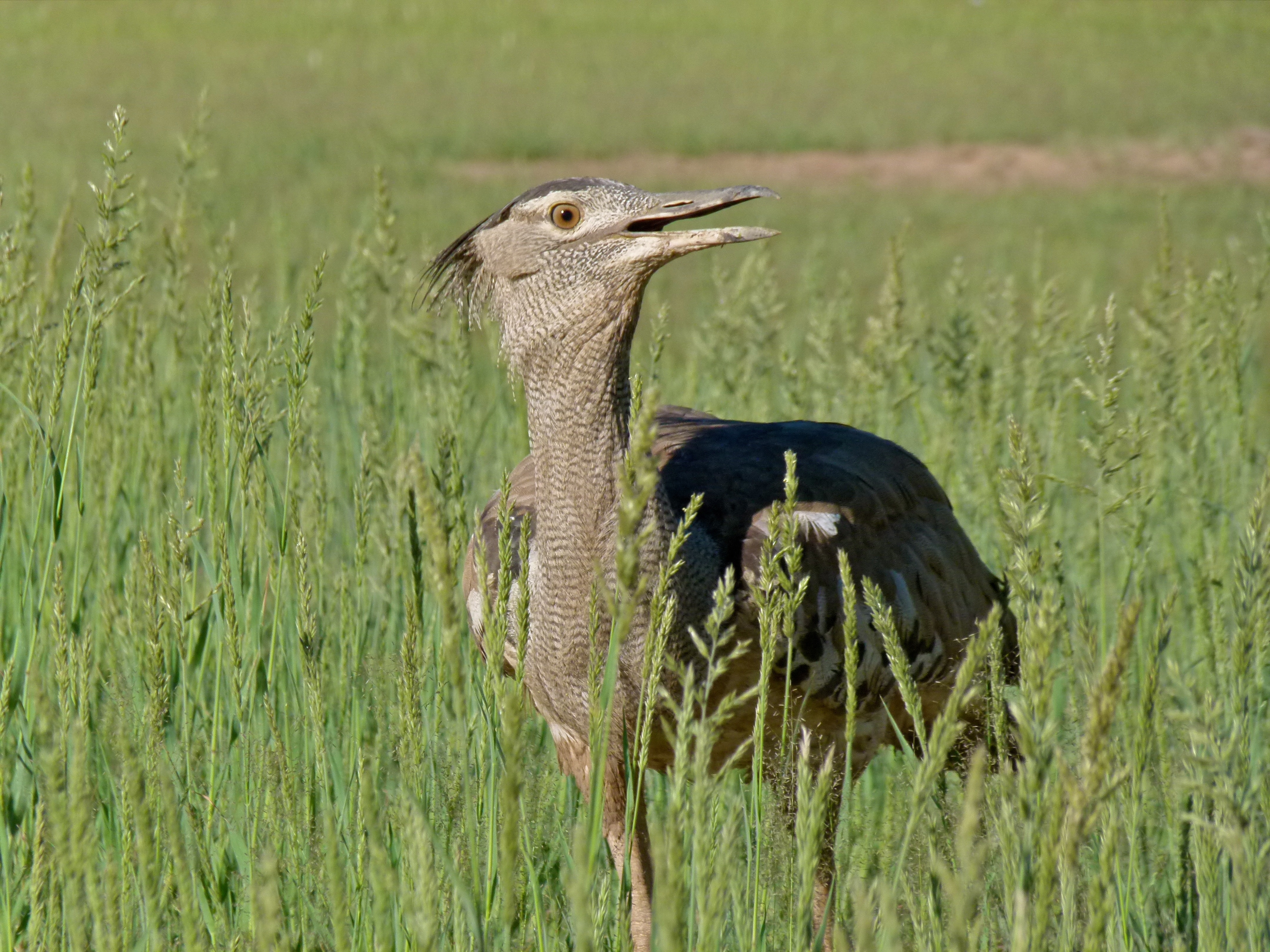
A kori bustard in Kgalagadi Transfrontier Park

The size and dark crest are generally diagnostic amongst the bustards found in the kori bustard's range. However, East Africa holds the greatest diversity of bustards anywhere, including some other quite large species, and these have the potential to cause confusion. Kori bustards are distinguished from Denham's bustard (Neotis denhamii) and Ludwig's bustard (Neotis ludwigii), both of which they sometimes forage with, by their greyer appearance and by their lack of a tawny red hind-neck and upper mantle. In flight it can be distinguished from both of these somewhat smaller bustards by not displaying any white markings on the upperwing, which is uniformly grey here. Both Stanley's and Ludwig's bustards lack the kori's dark crest. More similar to, and nearly the same size as, the kori is the closely related Arabian bustard (Ardeotis arabs) (despite its name, the latter species ranges well into East Africa). However, the Arabian species has white-tipped wing coverts, a browner back and very fine neck vermiculations and also lacks the black base to the neck and the black in the wing coverts as seen in the kori.

== Distribution and habitat ==
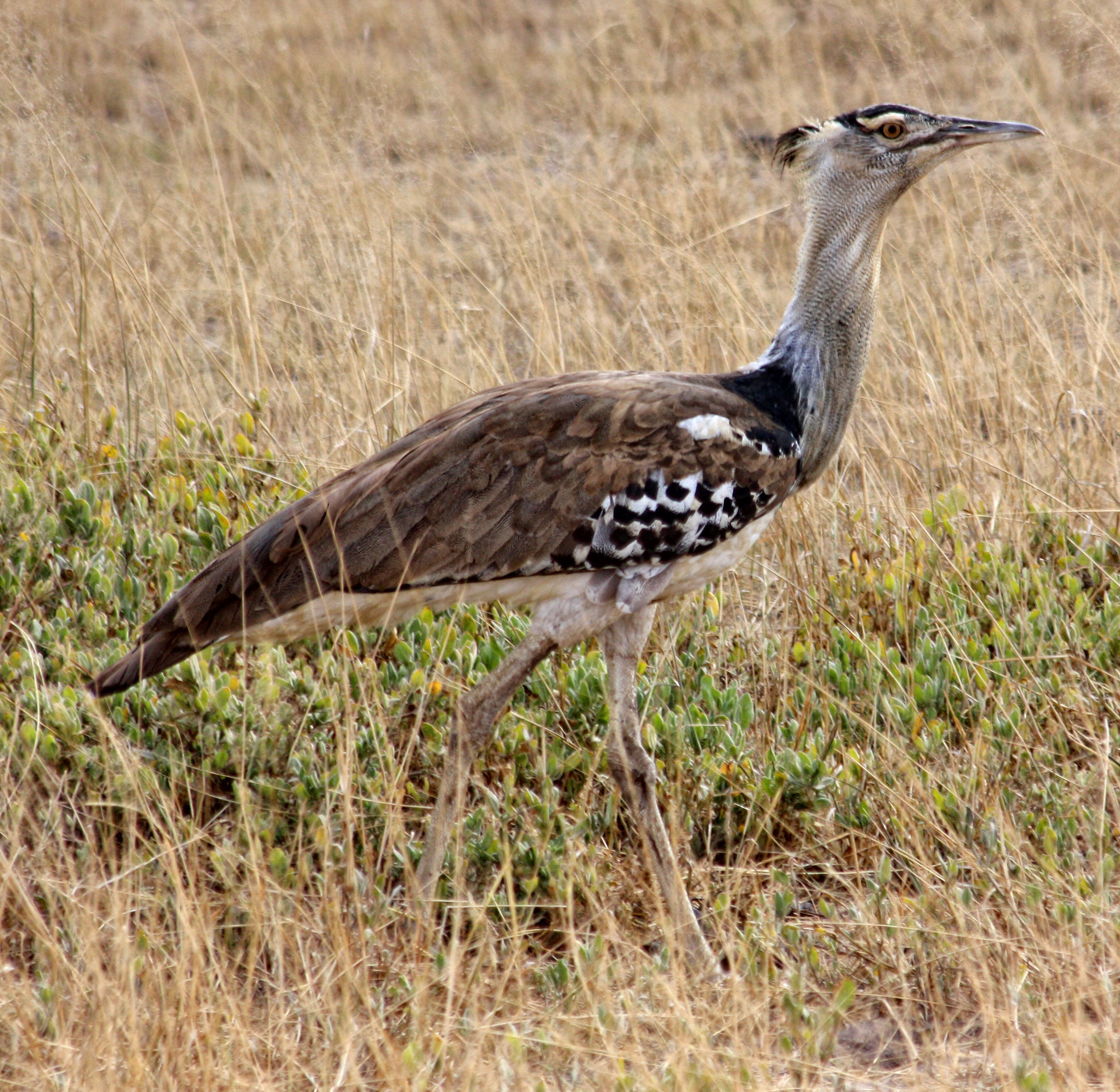
A. k. struthiunculus in Amboseli, Kenya

The kori bustard is found throughout southern Africa, except in densely wooded areas. They are common in Botswana and Namibia, extending into southern Angola and marginally into southwestern Zambia. In Zimbabwe they are generally sparse but locally common, particularly on the central plateau. Their distribution range extends along the Limpopo River valley into southern Mozambique and the eastern lowveld of South Africa. In South Africa they are also infrequent to rare in the Free State, North West and Northern Cape Provinces, extending southwards into the interior of the Western and Eastern Cape Provinces. Kori bustards are absent from the coastal lowlands along the south and east of South Africa and from high mountainous areas. This species is common in Tanzania at Ngorongoro National Park, Kitulo National Park and Serengeti National Park. A geographically disjunct population also occurs in the deserts and savanna of northeastern Africa. Here, the species ranges from extreme southeast South Sudan, north Somalia, Ethiopia through all of Kenya (except coastal regions), Tanzania and Uganda. Kenya may hold the largest population of kori bustards of any country and it can even border on abundant in the North Eastern Province. They are usually residential in their range, with some random, nomadic movement following rainfall.

This species occurs in open grassy areas, often characterized by sandy soil, especially Kalahari sands, and short grass usually near the cover of isolated clumps of trees or bushes. It may be found in plains, arid plateaus, highveld grassland, arid scrub, lightly wooded savanna, open dry bushveld and semi-desert. Where this species occurs, annual rainfall is quite low, between 100 and 600 mm (3.9 and 23.6 in). Breeding habitat is savanna in areas with sparse grass cover and scattered trees and shrubs. When nesting they sometimes use hilly areas. They follow fires or herds of foraging ungulates, in order to pick their various foods out of the short grasses. They may also be found in cultivated areas, especially wheat fields with a few scattered trees. This bustard is not found in well-wooded and forested areas due to the fact that it needs a lot of open space in which to take off. In arid grassland areas it is found along dry watercourses where patches of trees offer shade during the heat of the day.

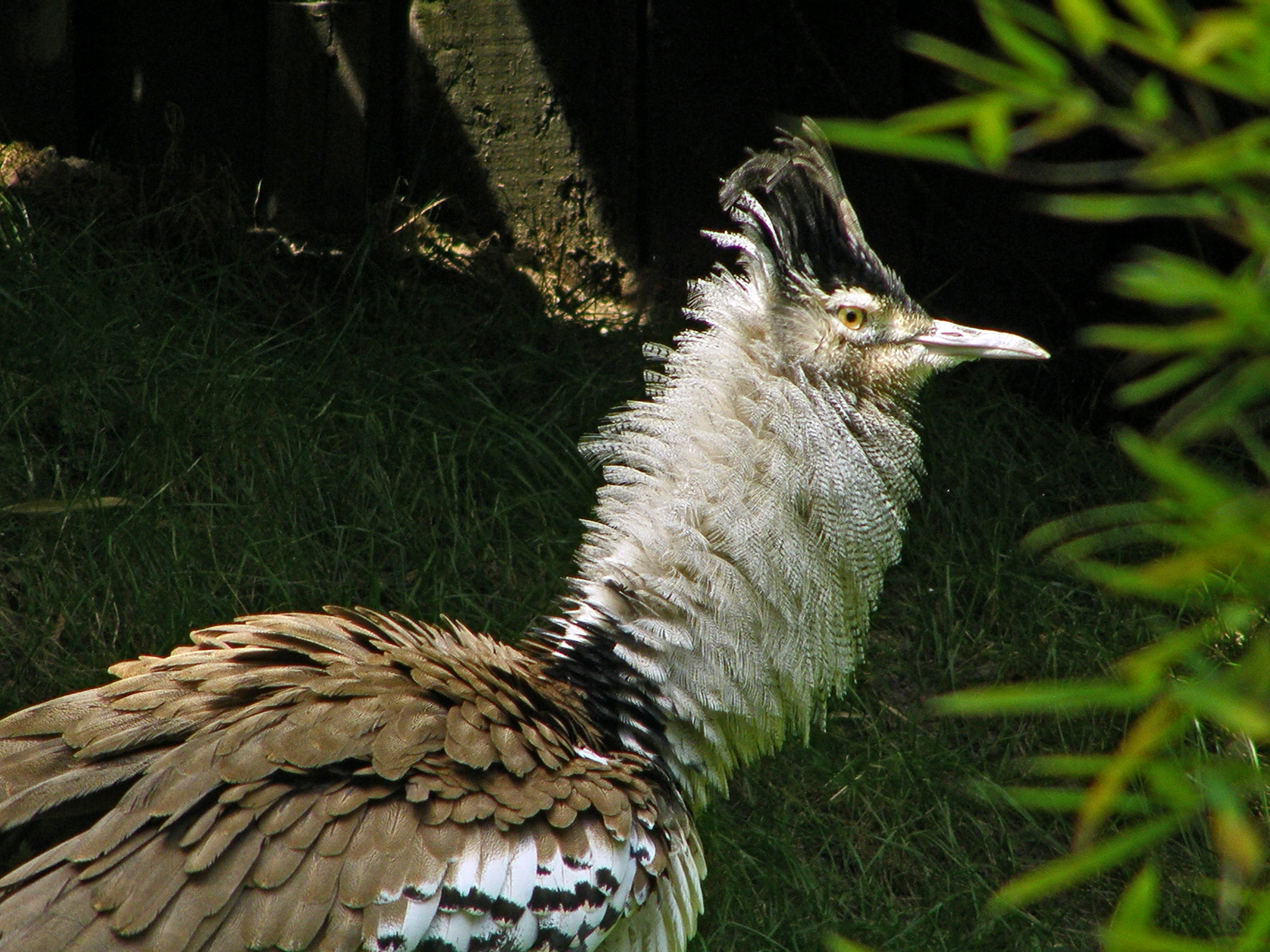
A close-up of the plumage of a captive male

== Behaviour ==
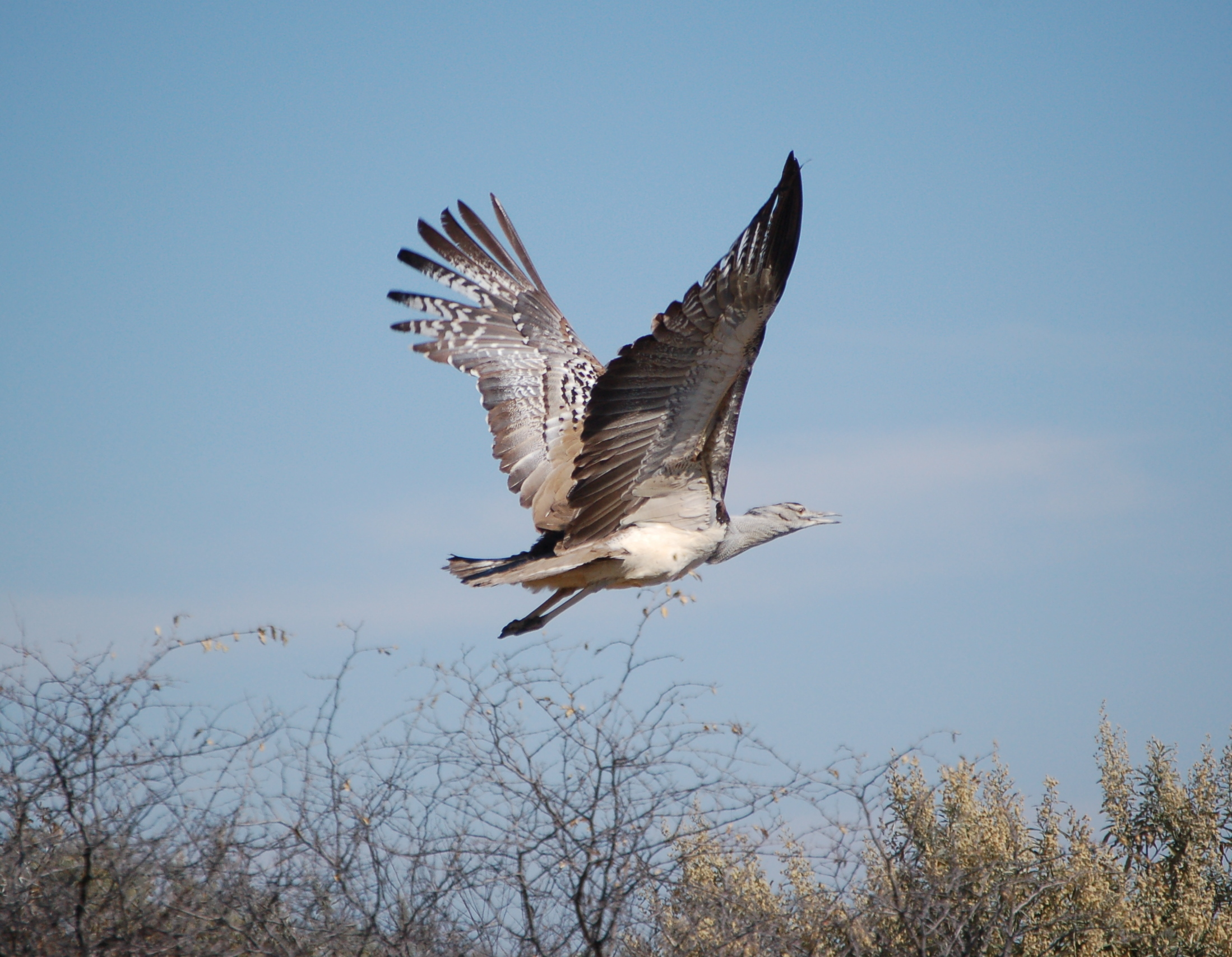
Ardeotis kori kori flying near Windhoek, Namibia. They are arguably the largest or one of the largest extant flying animals.

Kori bustards spend most of their time on the ground, with up to 70% of their time being on foot, although they do occasionally forage in low bushes and trees. This bustard is a watchful and wary bird. Their behavior varies however, and they are usually very shy, running or crouching at the first sign of danger; at other times they can be completely fearless of humans. They have a hesitant, slow manner of walking, and when they detect an intruder they try to escape detection by moving off quietly with the head held at an unusual angle of between 45° and 60°. Being a large and heavy bird, it avoids flying if possible. When alarmed it will first run and, if pushed further, will take to the air on the run with much effort, its wings making heavy wingbeats. Once airborne it flies more easily with slow, measured wingbeats, with the neck extended and the legs folded. It usually remains low and lands again within sight. When they land, kori bustards keep their wings spread and only fold them when the bird has slowed down to a walking speed. Kori bustards have no preen gland, so to keep clean, they produce a powder down. Sunbathing and dust bathing are practiced. Mostly residential, kori bustards may engage in nomadic movements. These migratory movements are probably influenced by rainfall and there is no evidence suggesting any regular pattern. These local migrations take place at night but have not been mapped. In the Etosha National Park these birds have been recorded moving up to 85 km (53 mi) from mopane woodland to open grassland plains and returning again the following season. Trial satellite tagging of one male kori bustard by the National Museums of Kenya demonstrated a migration along the Rift Valley between Tanzania and southeastern South Sudan. Additionally, adult and juvenile males move after the breeding season, whereas females do not appear to do so.

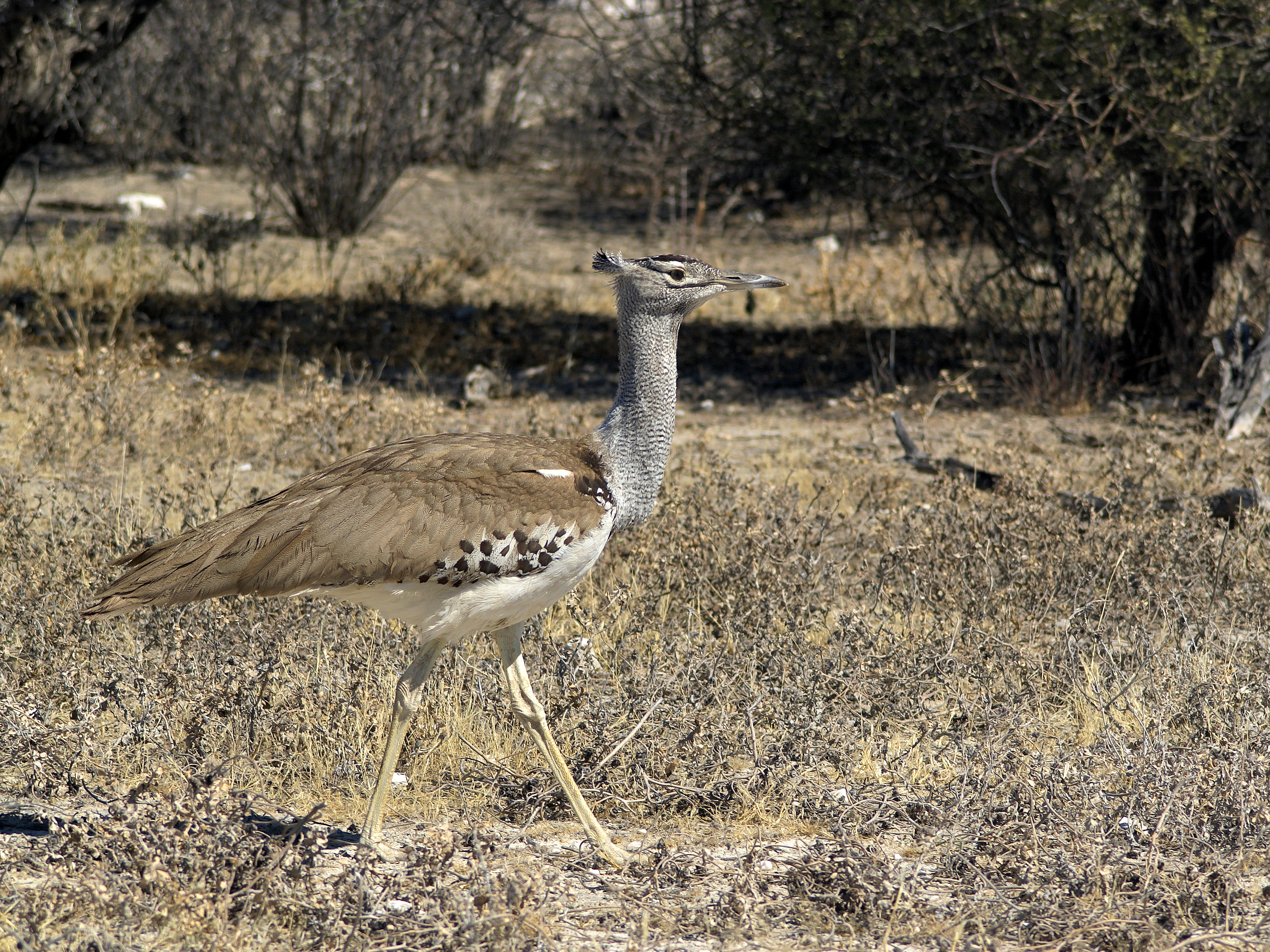
Female of the nominate race near Etosha National Park, Namibia

=== Voice ===
Less vocal than other bustards, the kori bustard is generally silent but, when alarmed, both sexes emit a loud growling bark. This is described as a ca-caa-ca call, repeated several times for up to 10 minutes. This call carries long distances. This call is most often given by females with young and males during agonistic encounters. Chicks as young as two weeks will also emit this alarm call when startled.

This male bird has a loud, booming mating call which is often used just before dawn and can be heard from far away. This is a deep, resonant woum-woum-woum-woum or oom-oom-oom or wum, wum, wum, wum, wummm. This call ends with the bill snapping which is only audible at close range. Outside of the breeding display, kori bustards are often silent. A high alarm call, generally uttered by females, is sometimes heard. They may utter a deep vum on takeoff.

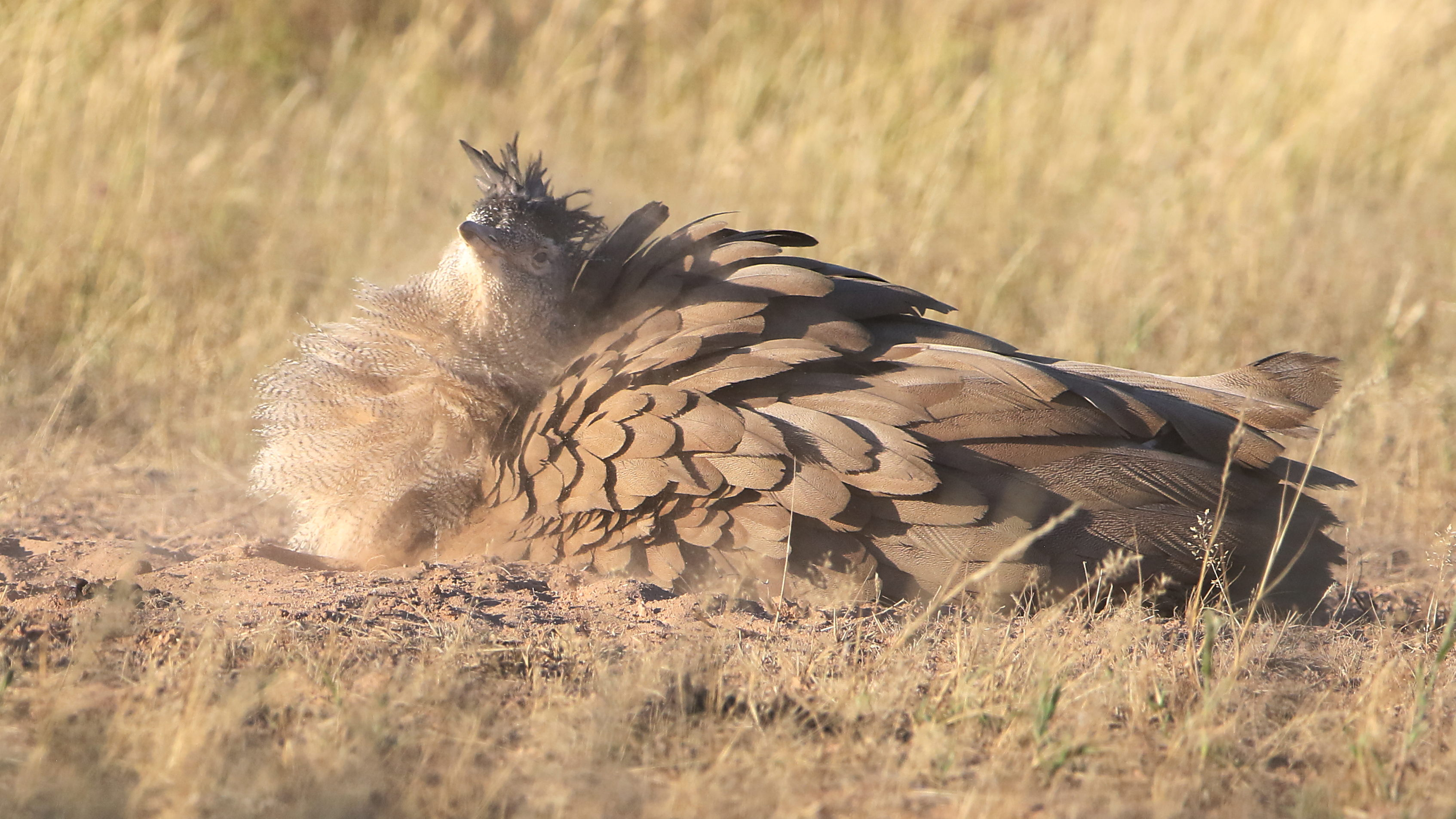
A kori bustard taking a dust or sand bath

=== Sociality ===
During the mating season, these birds are usually solitary but for the breeding pair. Otherwise, they are somewhat gregarious, being found in groups often including 5 to 6 birds but occasionally groups can number up to 40 individuals. Larger groups may be found around an abundant food source or at watering holes. In groups, birds are often fairly far apart from each other, often around a distance of 100 m (330 ft). Foraging groups are often single-sex. Such groups do not last long and often separate after a few days. These groups are believed advantageous both in that they may ensure safety in numbers against predation and may bring the bustards to prime food sources.

=== Feeding ===
Generally the kori bustard feeds during the morning and in the evening, spending the rest of the day standing still in any available shade. Walking slowly and sedately, they forage by picking at the ground with their bills and are most active in the first and last hours of daylight. Kori bustards are quite omnivorous birds. Insects are an important food source, with common species such as locusts, grasshoppers, dung beetles (Scarabaeus ssp.) and caterpillars being most often taken. They may follow large ungulates directly to catch insects flushed out by them or to pick through their dung for edible invertebrates. During outbreaks of locusts and caterpillars, kori bustards are sometimes found feeding on them in numbers. Other insect prey can include bush-crickets (Tettigonia ssp.), termites, hymenopterans and solifuges. Scorpions and molluscs may be taken opportunistically as well.

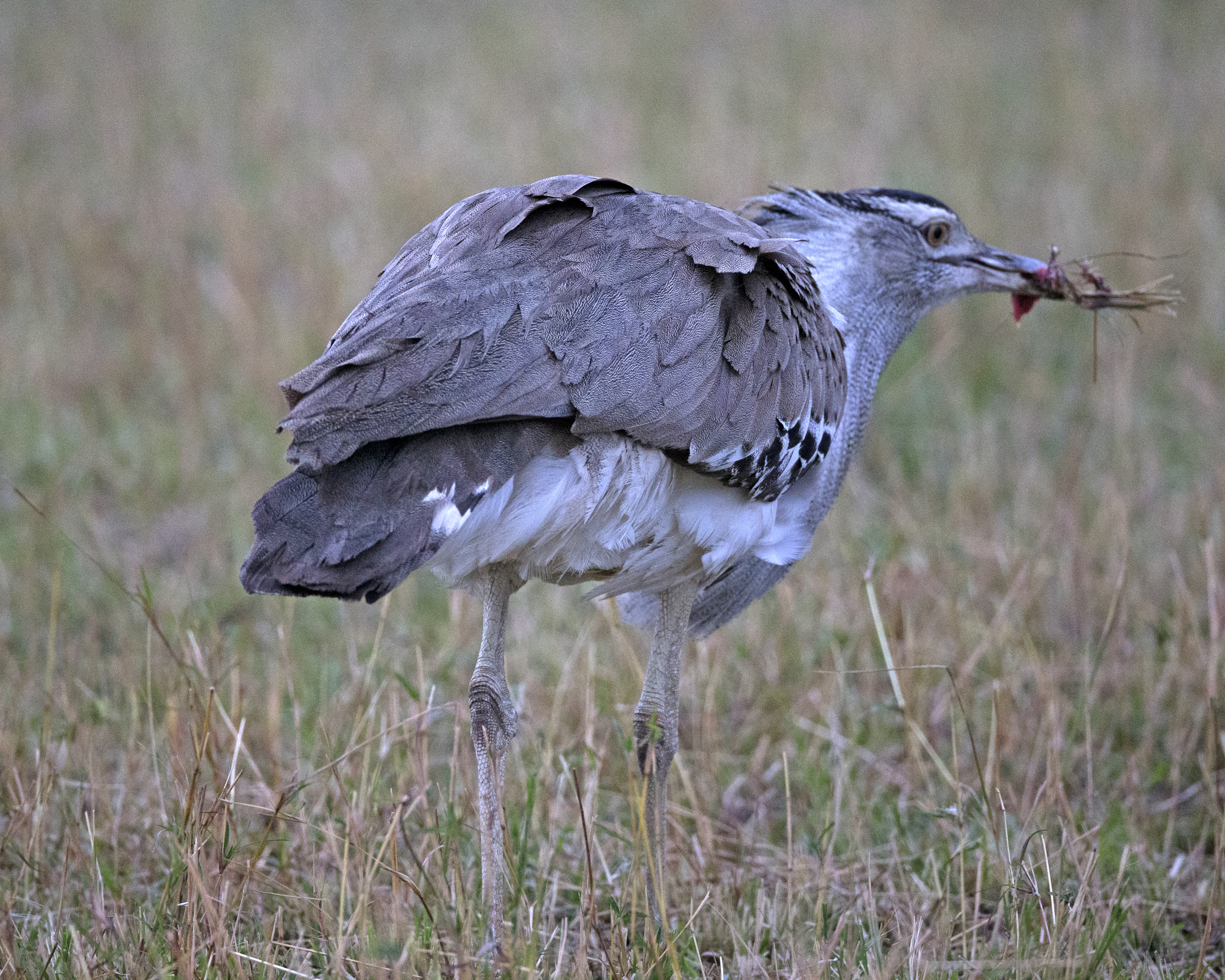
A kori bustard feeding in grassy area

Small vertebrates may also be taken regularly, including lizards, chameleons, small snakes, small mammals (especially rodents) and bird eggs and nestlings. They may occasionally eat carrion, especially from large animals killed in wildfires. Plant material is also an important food. Grasses and their seeds are perhaps the most prominent plant foods, but they may also eat seeds, berries, roots, bulbs, flowers, wild melons and green leaves. This bustard is very partial to Acacia gum. This liking has given rise to the Afrikaans common name Gompou or, literally translated, "gum peacock". They drink regularly when they can access water but they can be found as far as 40 km (25 mi) from water sources. Unusually, they suck up rather than scoop up water.

=== Breeding ===
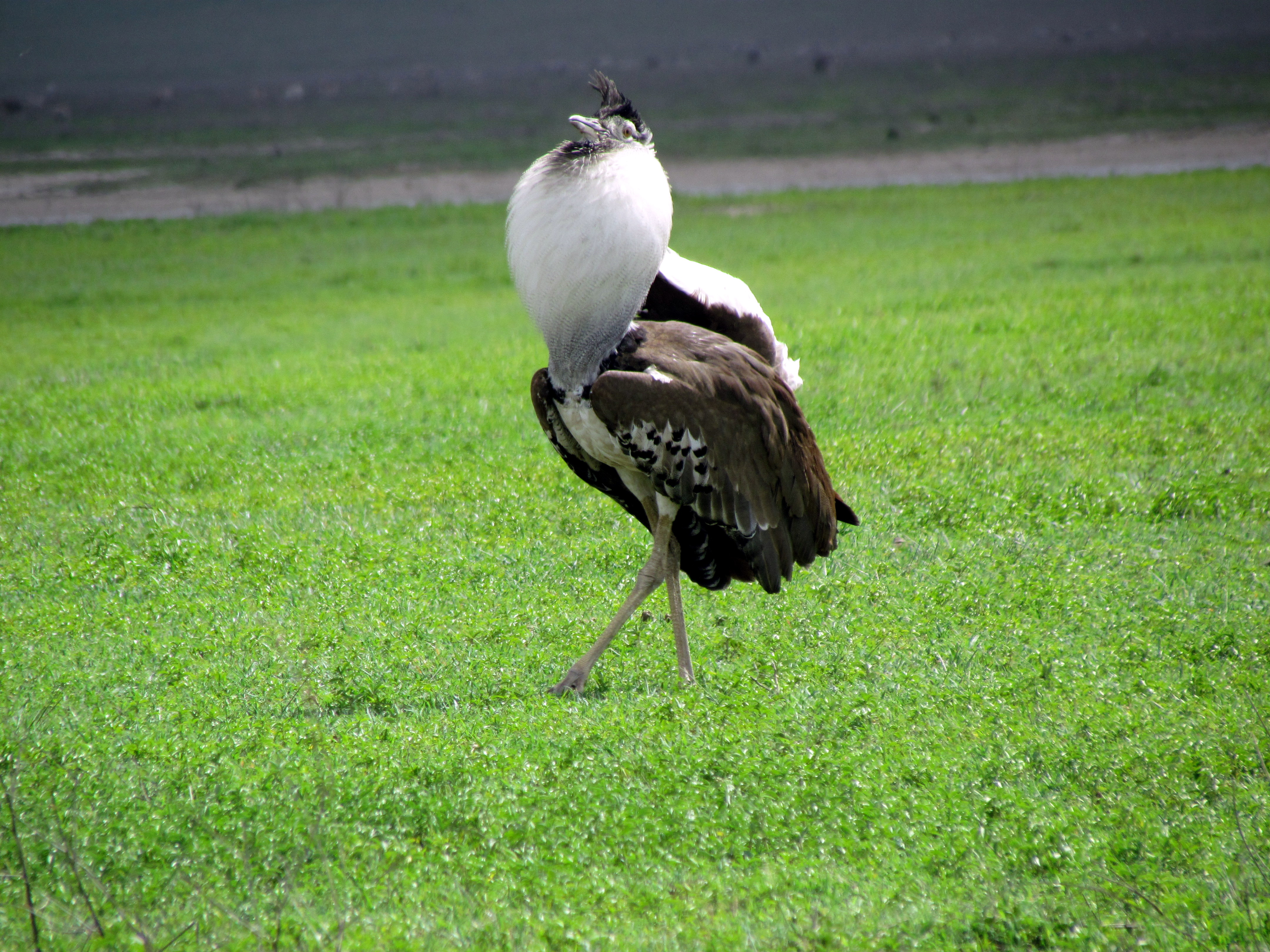
Male kori bustard (A. k. struthiunculus) displaying in Ngorongoro Conservation Area

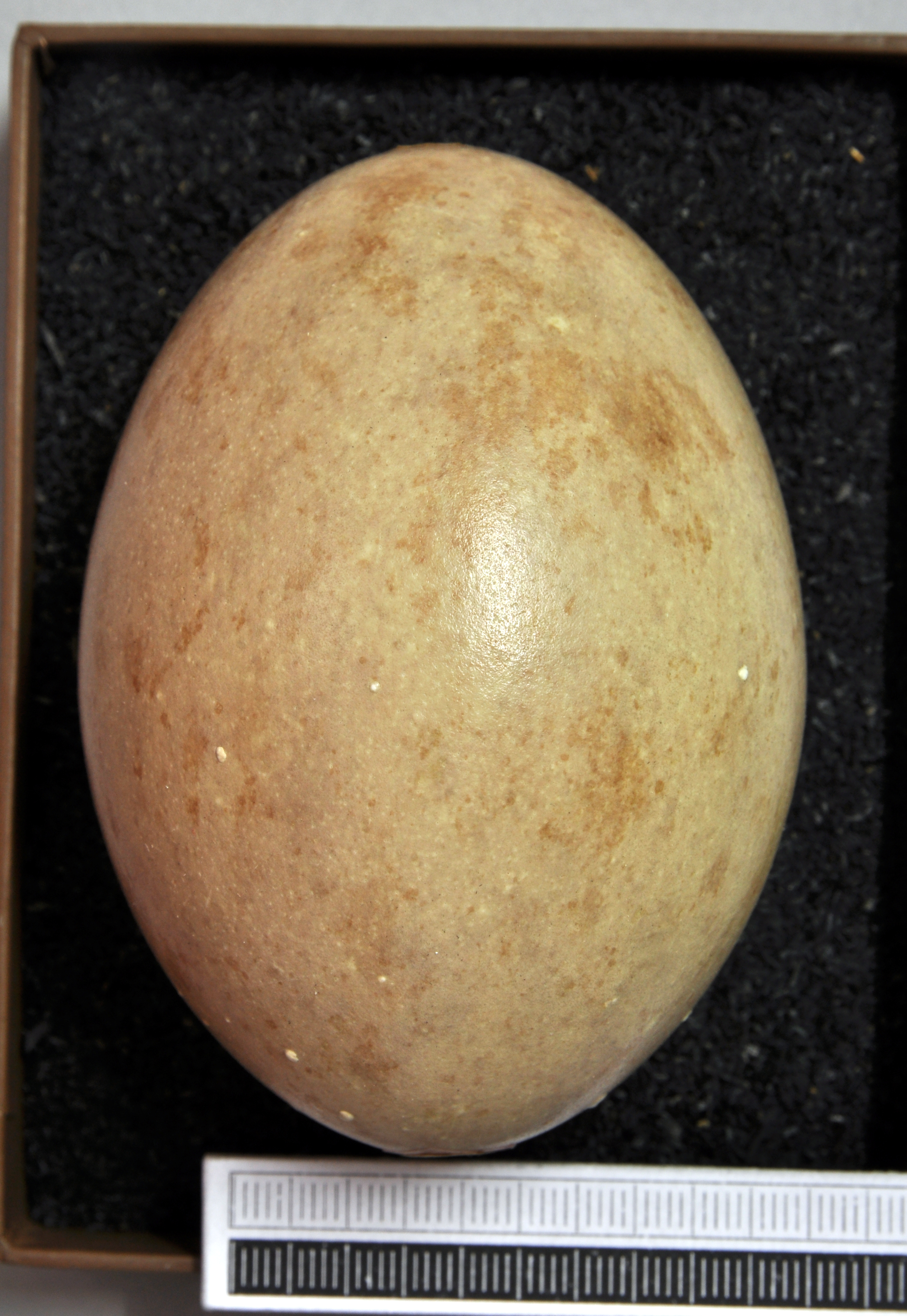
Egg, Collection Museum Wiesbaden

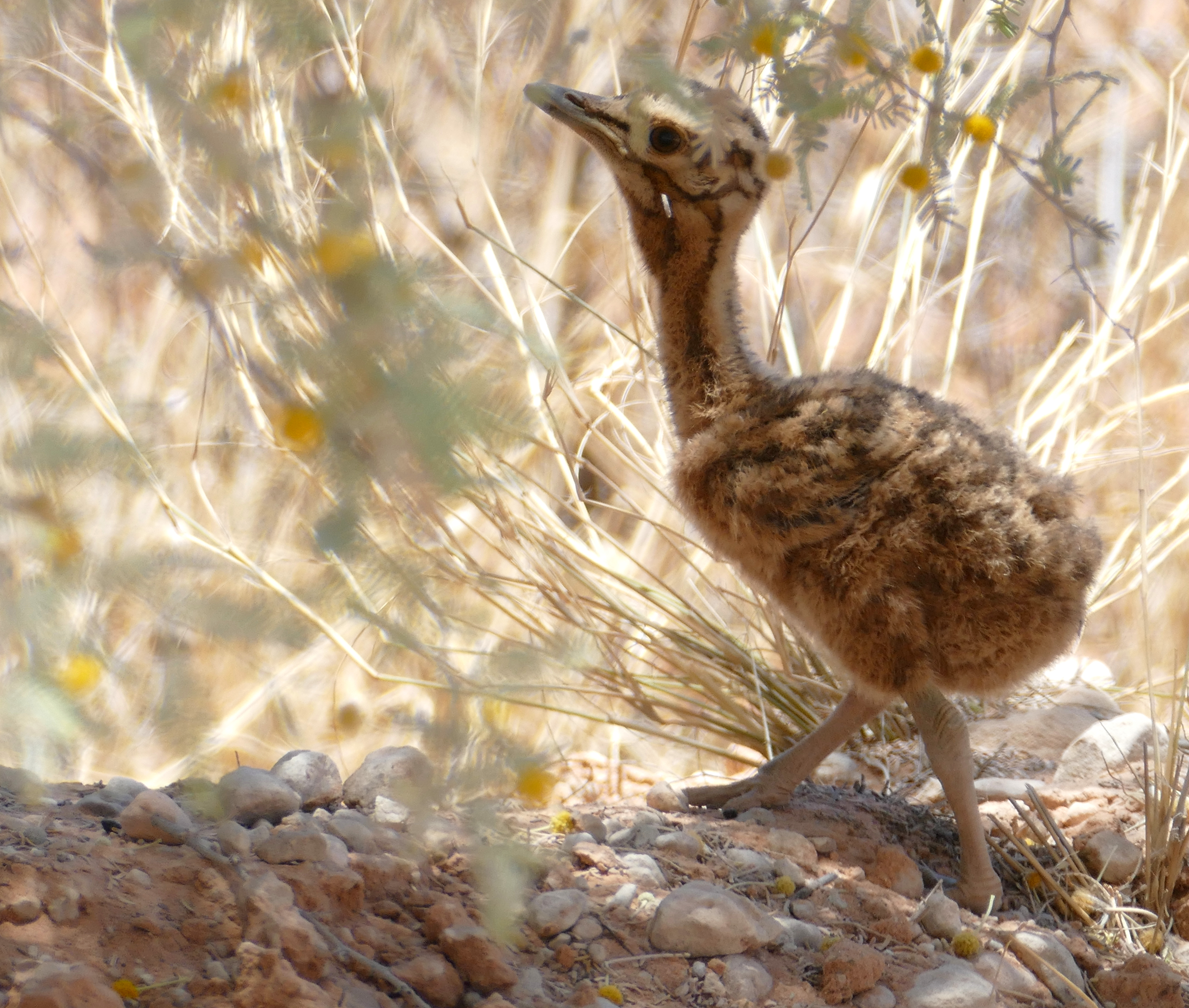
Chick in the Kgalagadi Transfrontier Park. A chick travels with its mother for more than a year, and may cover a kilometre a day while she rears it on grasshoppers and beetles.

The breeding seasons of the two subspecies of Kori bustards are distinguishable. In general, A. k. struthiunculus breeds from December to August and A. k. kori breeds from September to February. Breeding is closely tied with rainfall, and in drought years, may be greatly reduced or not even occur.

Kori bustards engage in lek mating. All bustards have polygynous breeding habits, in which one male displays to attract several females, and mates with them all. Males display at regularly used sites, each male utilizing several dispersed leks or display areas. These displays usually take place in the mornings and evenings. The courtship displays of the males are impressive and elaborate, successfully advertising their presence to potential mates. The males hold their heads backwards, with cheeks bulging, the crest is held erect, the bill open and they inflate their gular pouches, forming a white throat "balloon". During this display the oesophagus inflates to as much as four times its normal size and resembles a balloon. They also puff out their frontal neck feathers which are splayed upwards showing their white underside. The white may be visible up to 1 km (0.62 mi) away during display. Their wings are drooped and their tails are raised upwards and forwards onto their backs like a turkey, the rectrices being held vertically and their undertail coverts fluffed out. They enhance their performance with an exaggerated bouncing gait. When displaying they stride about with their necks puffed out, their tail fanned and their wings planed and pointed downward. They also emit a low-pitched booming noise when the neck is at maximum inflation and snap their bills open and shut. Several males dispersed over a wide area gather to display but usually one is dominant and the others do not display in his presence and move away. The displaying males are visited by the females who presumably select the male with the most impressive display. Occasionally fights between males can be serious during the mating season when display areas are being contested, with the two competitors smashing into each other's bodies and stabbing each other with their bills. They may stand chest-to-chest, tails erect, bills locked and "push" one another for up to 30 minutes.

Following the display, the copulation begins with the female lying down next to the dominant displaying male. He stands over her for 5–10 minutes, stepping from side to side and pecking her head in a slow, deliberate fashion, tail and crest feathers raised. She recoils at each peck. He then lowers himself onto his tarsi and continues pecking her until he shuffles forward and mounts with wings spread. Copulation lasts seconds after which both stand apart and ruffle their plumage. The female then sometimes barks and the male continues with his display.

As with all bustards, the female makes no real nest. The female kori bustard lays her eggs on the ground in a shallow, unlined hollow, rather than the typical scrape. This nest is usually located within 4 m (13 ft) of a tree or shrub, termite mound or an outcrop of rocks. The hollow may measure 300–450 mm (12–18 in) in diameter and be almost completely covered by the female when she's incubating. Due to their ground location, nests are often cryptic and difficult for a human to find, unless stumbled onto by chance. The same site is sometimes reused in successive years. The kori bustard is a solitary nester and there is no evidence of territoriality amongst the females. Usually two eggs are laid, though seldom 1 or 3 may be laid. Clutch size is likely correlated to food supply. They are cryptically colored with the ground color being dark buff, brown or olive and well marked and blotched with shades of brown, grey and pale purple. Eggs are somewhat glossy or waxy and have a pitted-looking surface. Egg size is 81 to 86 mm (3.2 to 3.4 in) in height and 58 to 61 mm (2.3 to 2.4 in) width. The eggs weigh individually about 149 g (5.3 oz), with a range of 121 to 178 g (4.3 to 6.3 oz).

The female, who alone does all the brooding behavior without male help, stays at the nest 98% of the time, rarely eating and never drinking. Occasionally she stretches her legs and raises her wings overhead. The female regularly turns the eggs with her bill. The female's plumage is drab and earth-colored, which makes her well camouflaged. She occasionally picks up pieces of vegetation and drops them on her back to render her camouflage more effective. If they need to feed briefly, the females go to and from the nest with a swift, silent crouching walk. If approached the incubating bird either slips unobtrusively from the nest or sits tight, only flying off at the last moment. The incubation period is 23 to 30 days, though is not known to exceed 25 days in wild specimens. The young are precocial and very well camouflaged. The lores are tawny, the crown tawny mottled black. A broad white supercilium bordered with black meets on the nape, extending down the centre of the nape. The neck is white with irregular black stripes from behind the eye and from the base of the lower mandibles. The upper parts are tawny and black with 3 black lines running along the back. The underparts are whitish. When the chicks hatch, the mother brings them a steady stream of food, most of it soft so the chicks can eat it easily. Captive hatchlings weigh 78 to 116 g (2.8 to 4.1 oz) on their first day but grow quickly. The precocial chicks are able to follow their mother around several hours after hatching. After a few weeks, the young actively forage closely with their mothers. They fledge at 4 to 5 weeks old, but are not self-assured fliers until 3 to 4 months. On average, around 67% of eggs successfully hatch (testimony to the effective camouflage of nests) and around one of the two young survive to adulthood. In Namibia and Tanzania, breeding success has been found to be greatly reduced during times of drought. Most young leave their mothers in their second year of life, but do not start breeding until they are fully mature at three to four years old in both sexes in studies conducted both of wild and captive bustards. The lifespan of wild kori bustards is not known but they may live to at least 26 or possibly 28 years old in captivity.

=== Interspecies interactions ===
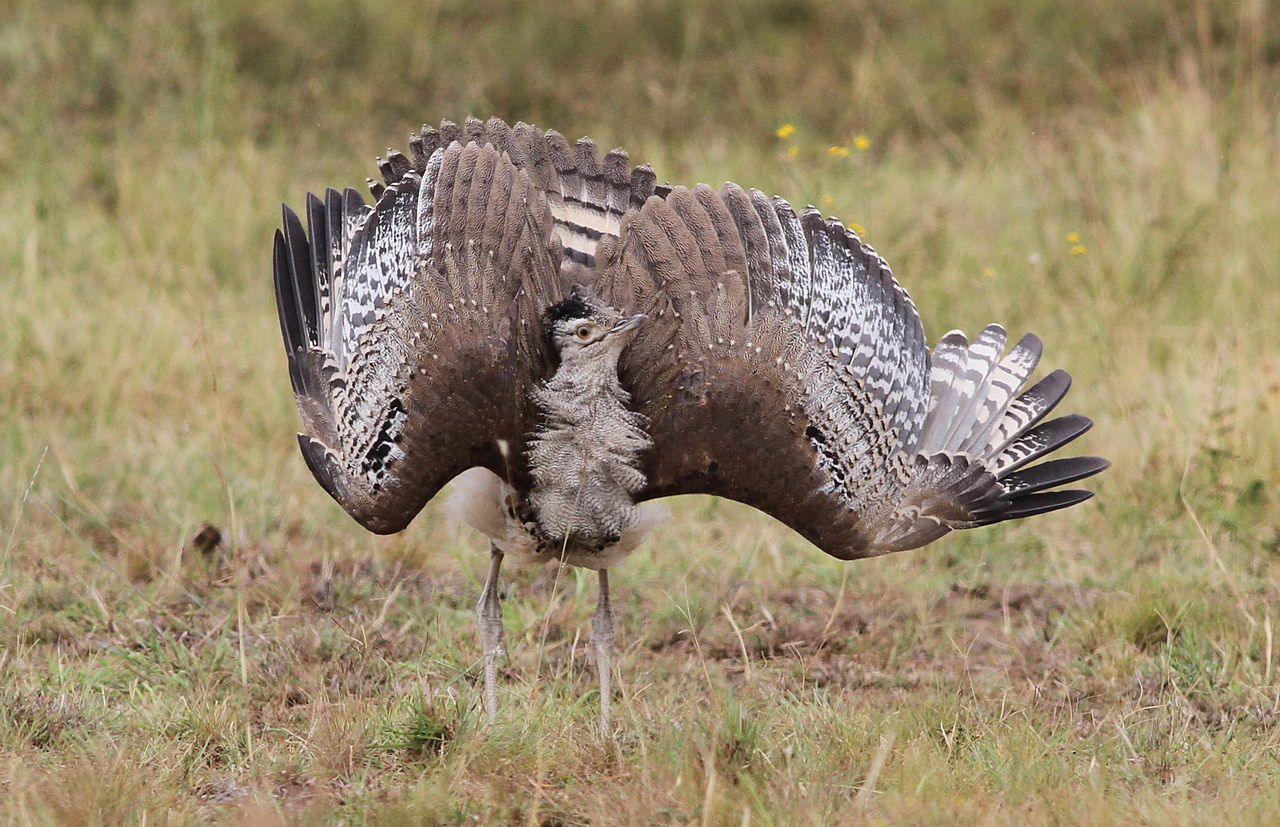
Shock display of A. kori kori at Pilanesberg Game Reserve – the head is lowered, the wings are opened with their upper surface angled forward, and the tail is raised and fanned.

The kori bustard is often found in areas with a large quantity of antelope and other game. In Tanzania, kori bustards regularly attend blue wildebeest (Connochaetes taurinus) herds and feed on the small mammals and insects disturbed by them. Sometimes kori bustards are found with southern carmine bee-eaters (Merops nubicoides) and northern carmine bee-eaters (Merops nubicus) riding on their backs as they stride through the grass. The bee-eaters make the most of their walking perch by hawking insects from the bustard's back that are disturbed by the bustard's wandering. This is regularly seen in Chobe National Park, Botswana but has only been reported once elsewhere. There is also one record of fork-tailed drongos (Dicrurus adsimilis) perching on their backs in a similar manner. Kori bustards have been observed to behave aggressively to non-threatening animals at watering holes, as they may raise their crests, open their wings and peck aggressively. They have been seen acting aggressively towards red-crested korhaans (Eupodotis ruficrista), springbok (Antidorcas marsupialis), plains zebra (Equus quagga), and gemsbok (Oryx gazella). When kept in captivity, kori bustards have been kept together with numerous other (typically African) species in close quarters. Fifteen other bird species and 12 mammals successfully cohabitated with them (including rhinoceros). However, the bustards sometimes injure or kill the young of everything from waterfowl to dik-diks and may be killed by larger species from ostriches (Struthio camelus) to zebras (Equus spp.).

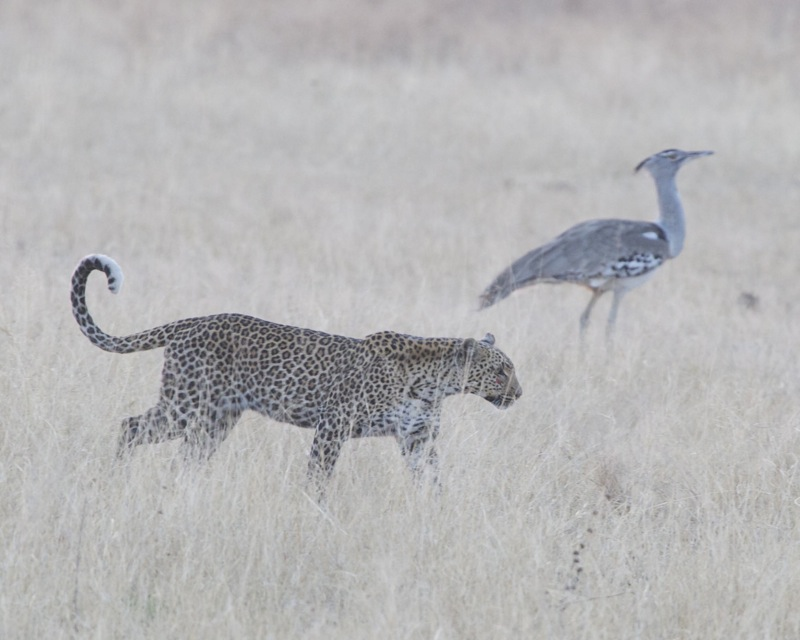
A kori bustard walking near a leopard, seemingly ignoring one another

Being a large, ground-dwelling bird species, the kori bustard has to face many of Africa's myriad of formidable terrestrial predators, including Leopards (Panthera pardus), caracals (Caracal caracal), cheetahs (Acinonyx jubatus), lions (Panthera leo), spotted hyena (Crocuta crocuta), African rock pythons (Python sebae), and jackals (Canis spp.). While large predators such as big cats usually do not target kori bustard often since they typically hunt larger mammalian prey, caracals occasionally ambush roosting adults in particular regions. Additionally, there is a report that a pair of black-backed jackals manage to take down an adult male kori bustard. Other mammalian predators, including warthogs (Phacochoerus spp.), mongoose and baboons (Papio ssp.) may eat eggs and small chicks.

While too large to be prey for most predatory birds, it is known that the martial eagles (Polemaetus bellicosus) can be a serious natural enemy even for adult males of at least twice their own weight. Chicks of up to largish size may be vulnerable to raptors such as Verreaux's eagle (Aquila verreauxii), tawny eagles (Aquila rapax), Verreaux's eagle-owls (Bubo lacteus) and Cape eagle-owls (Bubo capensis).

When alarmed, kori bustards make barking calls and bend forward and spread their tail and wings to appear larger. Adults will growl when their young are threatened by predators. Chicks tend to be the most vulnerable to predators by far. Many, despite their cryptic camouflage and the mother's defenses, are regularly picked off by jackals and leopards at night. Up to 82% of kori bustard chicks die in their first year of life. When found with carmine bee-eaters, the smaller birds may incidentally provide some protection from predators due to their vigilance. The display of the adult male may make it more conspicuous to larger predators, such as hyenas or lions.

== Status ==
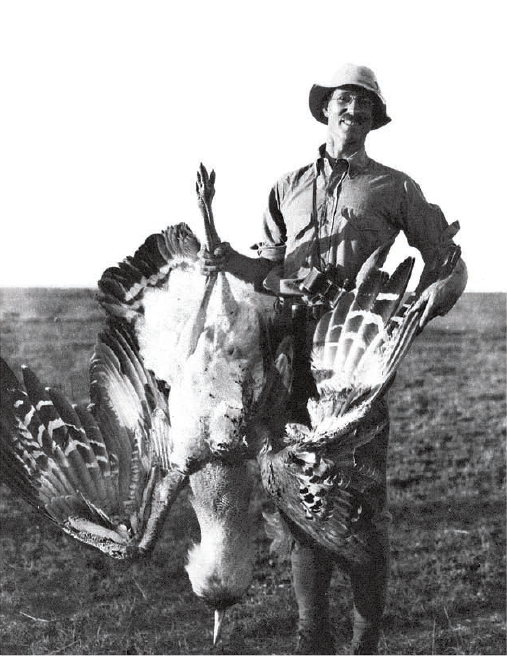
Richard Meinertzhagen holds a shot kori bustard near Nairobi in 1915, illustrating the bird's huge size.

The kori bustard is generally a somewhat scarce bird. Appendix II of CITES and the 2000 Eskom Red Data Book for Birds lists the status of the nominate race as Vulnerable, estimating that in the next three generations, it is expected to decline by 10% in South Africa. In protected areas, they can be locally common. Viable populations exist in unprotected areas as well (e.g. Ethiopia and Sudan, and in Tanzania around Lake Natron and in the foothills of Mount Kilimanjaro) but in these areas, the birds are hunted. They have been much reduced by hunting, having been traditionally snared in Acacia gum baits and traps. Although no longer classified as game birds, they are still sometimes eaten. In Namibia, they are indicated as game as they are called the "Christmas turkey" and in South Africa, the "Kalahari Kentucky". Hunting of bustards is difficult to manage.

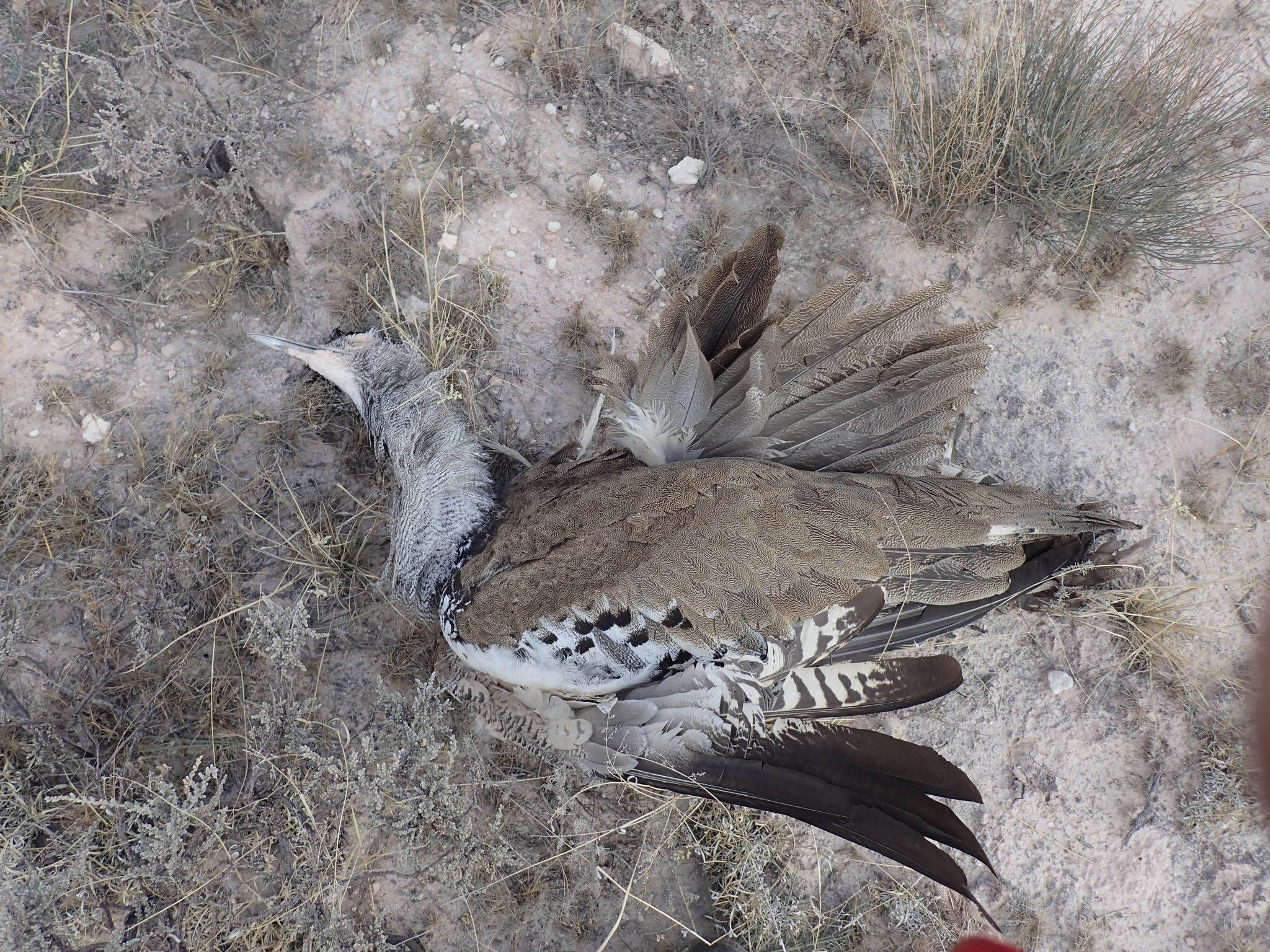
Southern kori bustard (A. k. kori), killed by overhead line collision

The kori bustard is now generally uncommon outside major protected areas. Habitat destruction is a major problem for the species, compounded by woody plant encroachment due to overgrazing by livestock and agricultural development. Poisons used to control locusts may also effect and collisions with overhead power wires regularly claim kori bustards. One 10 km (6.2 mi) stretch of overhead powerlines in the Karoo killed 22 kori bustards during a five-month period. Kori bustards tend to avoid areas used heavily by humans. Nonetheless, because it has such a large range and its rate of decline is thought to be relatively slow, the kori bustard is not currently listed in a threatened category on the IUCN Red List.

The species is prominent in many native African cultures, variously due to its imposing, impressive size, spectacular displays by adult males or the cryptic nature of the nesting female. The kori bustard features in dances and songs of the San people of Botswana, and paintings of these bustards feature in ancient San rock art. It was associated with royalty in Botswana since they reserved it for their own consumption, and since 2014 it is also the national bird of Botswana.

== See also ==
- Sara Hallager - ornithologist who specializes in kori bustard
