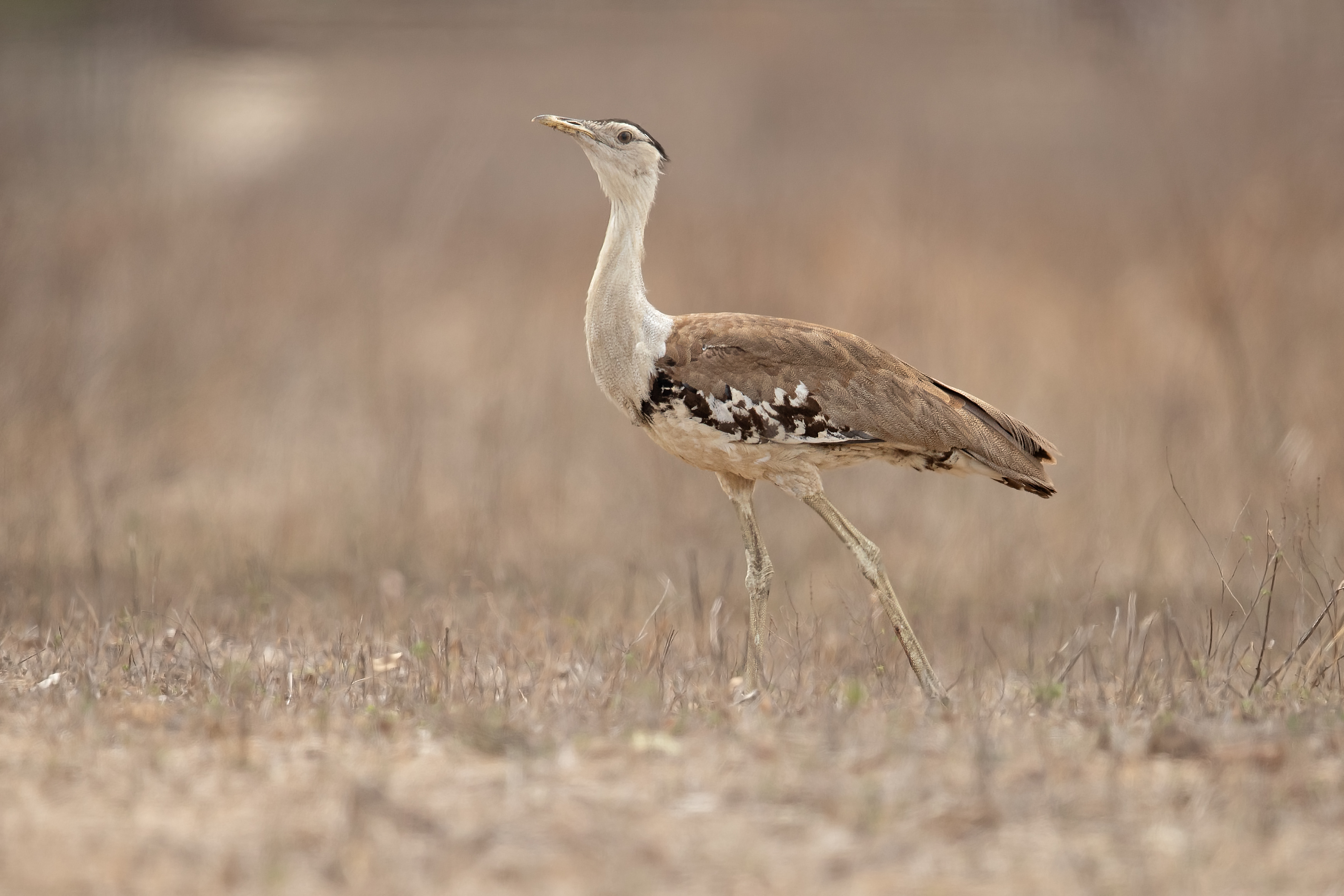

Conservation status
- Least Concern (IUCN 3.1)
- CITES Appendix II

Scientific classification
- Kingdom: Animalia
- Phylum: Chordata
- Class: Aves
- Order: Otidiformes
- Family: Otididae
- Genus: Ardeotis
- Species: A. australis

Binomial name
- Ardeotis australis (Gray, JE, 1829)

= Australian bustard =

Species of bird

The Australian bustard (Ardeotis australis) is a large ground-dwelling bird that is common in grassland, woodland and open agricultural country across northern Australia and southern New Guinea. It stands at about one metre (3 ft 3 in) high, and its wingspan is around twice that length. The species is nomadic, flying to areas when food becomes plentiful, and capable of travelling long distances. They were once widespread and common to the open plains of Australia, but became rare in regions that have been used for farming. The bustard is omnivorous, mostly consuming the fruit or seed of plants, but also eating invertebrates such as crickets, grasshoppers, smaller mammals, birds and reptiles.

The species is also commonly referred to as the plains turkey, and in Central Australia as the bush turkey, particularly by Aboriginal people, who hunt it, although the latter name may also be used for the Australian brushturkey, as well as the orange-footed scrubfowl.

== Taxonomy ==
The species was first described by John Edward Gray in 1829, who assigned it the name Otis australis. Gray's specimen was obtained in New South Wales and was held in the General T. Davies collection. The whereabouts of that type is now unknown, after being sold to a private buyer. John Gould also provided a description in 1841, and named the bird Otis australasianus, using a skin obtained in Western Australia. That specimen was later nominated as the syntype and is held at the Academy of Natural Sciences of Philadelphia.

Placement within the family Otididae has been variously assigned. Gray recognised the species in the genus Otis in the first description, Gregory Mathews later proposed the names Choriotis and Austrotis, along with subspecific descriptions, and it was placed as a species of Eupodotis in the mid-twentieth century.

Common names for Ardeotis australis include bustard, Australian bustard, plains turkey, wild turkey and native turkey. The Arrernte name for the bird is kere artewe, and the Luritja name is kipara. The Gamilaraay and Yuwaalaraay people of northern New South Wales use the names barawaa and gumbulgaban, with the latter name possibly being derived from the species' mating display. The Larrakia name is danimila. The species is also presumed to be important to the Noongar peoples, whose names for the bird included the word bebilya, recorded by John Gilbert and published in Birds of Australia (Gould, 1848).

== Description ==
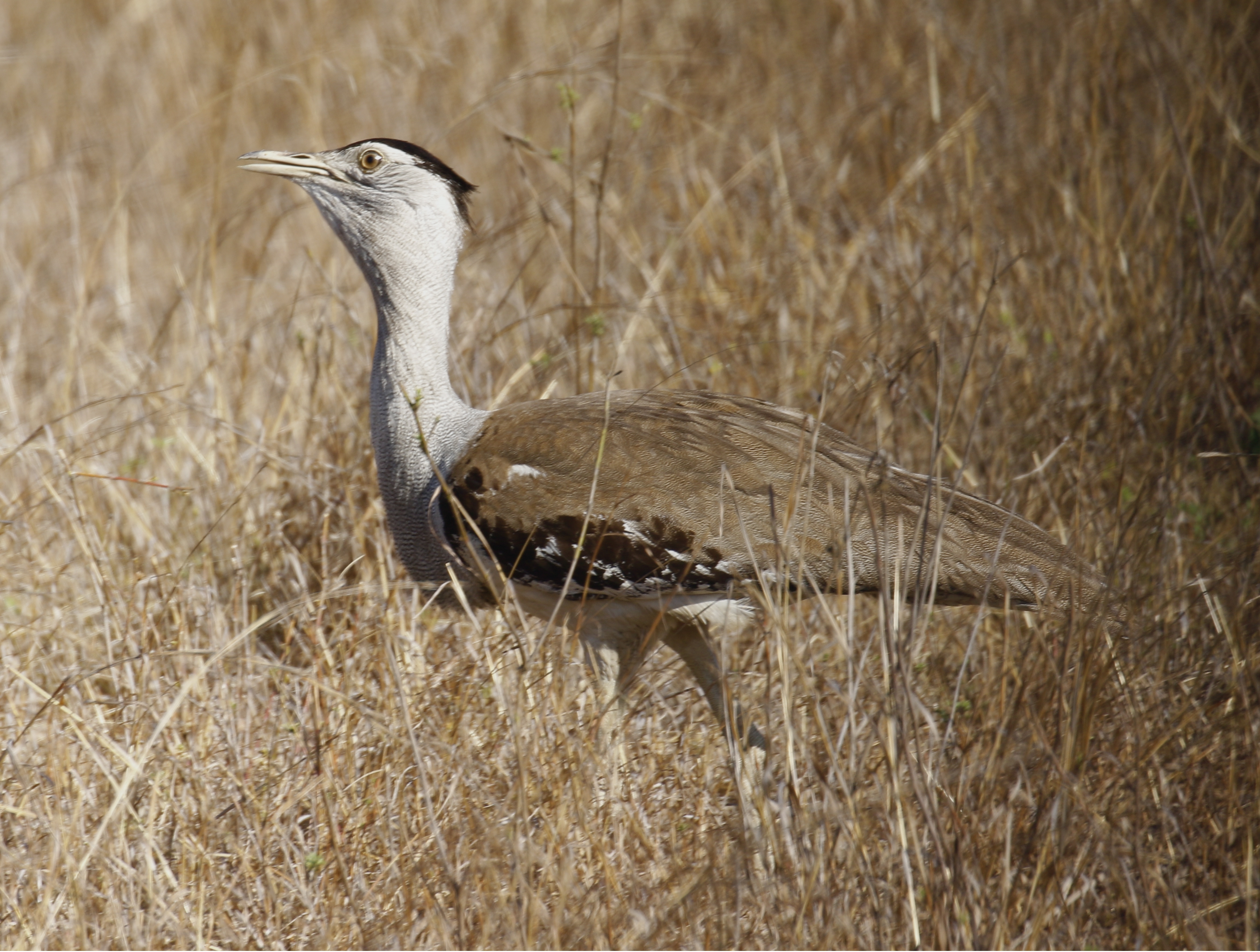
Mount Carbine, Australia

The only Australian species of Ardeotis, a genus occurring in the African, Indian and Australasian regions, this bustard is a large terrestrial bird that resembles an American turkey in its form and behaviour. It is readily distinguished by its large size, long legs and habits while slowly striding across open plains. The general coloration of A. australis is black at the crown and nape, the long neck is pale grey at the front, and brown plumage cover the wings and upper body. The sexes are similar in appearance, females are smaller in stature, wingspan and weight than the males. The abdomen is white and separated from the light grey of the neck by a black band of feathers. The wing coverts are patchily coloured with black and white patterning, which is visible while at rest or especially in flight. The iris is white, and their beak is variously whitish to brown in colour. The legs are long and yellow to cream coloured.

Males are up to 1.2 m (47 in) tall with a 2.3 m (7.5 ft) wingspan. The average weight for males is 6.3 kg (14 lb), with a range of 4.3 to 12.76 kg (9.5 to 28.1 lb). The female is quite a bit smaller at 80 cm (31 in) tall, with a 1.8 m (5.9 ft) wingspan and an average body mass of 3.2 kg (7.1 lb) in a range of 2.4 to 6.35 kg (5.3 to 14.0 lb) but is similarly coloured.

The largest male recorded was 14.5 kg (32 lb), a specimen obtained in Victoria. Reports of large birds, presumably males, were given by Tom Carter in the west (16 lb), a recorded range of 16–18 lb by E. F. Boehm in South Australia was exceeded in some specimens (28 lb). The smaller specimens in records are of an unwell adult weighing 9 lb, shot by Carter at Broomehill, and a healthy but small specimen of 7½ lb captured and weighed by Dominic Serventy and Hubert Whittell at Bridgetown in 1949. Although it is the largest extant flying land bird in Australia, this long-legged bird is the smallest species in the genus Ardeotis.

== Behaviour ==
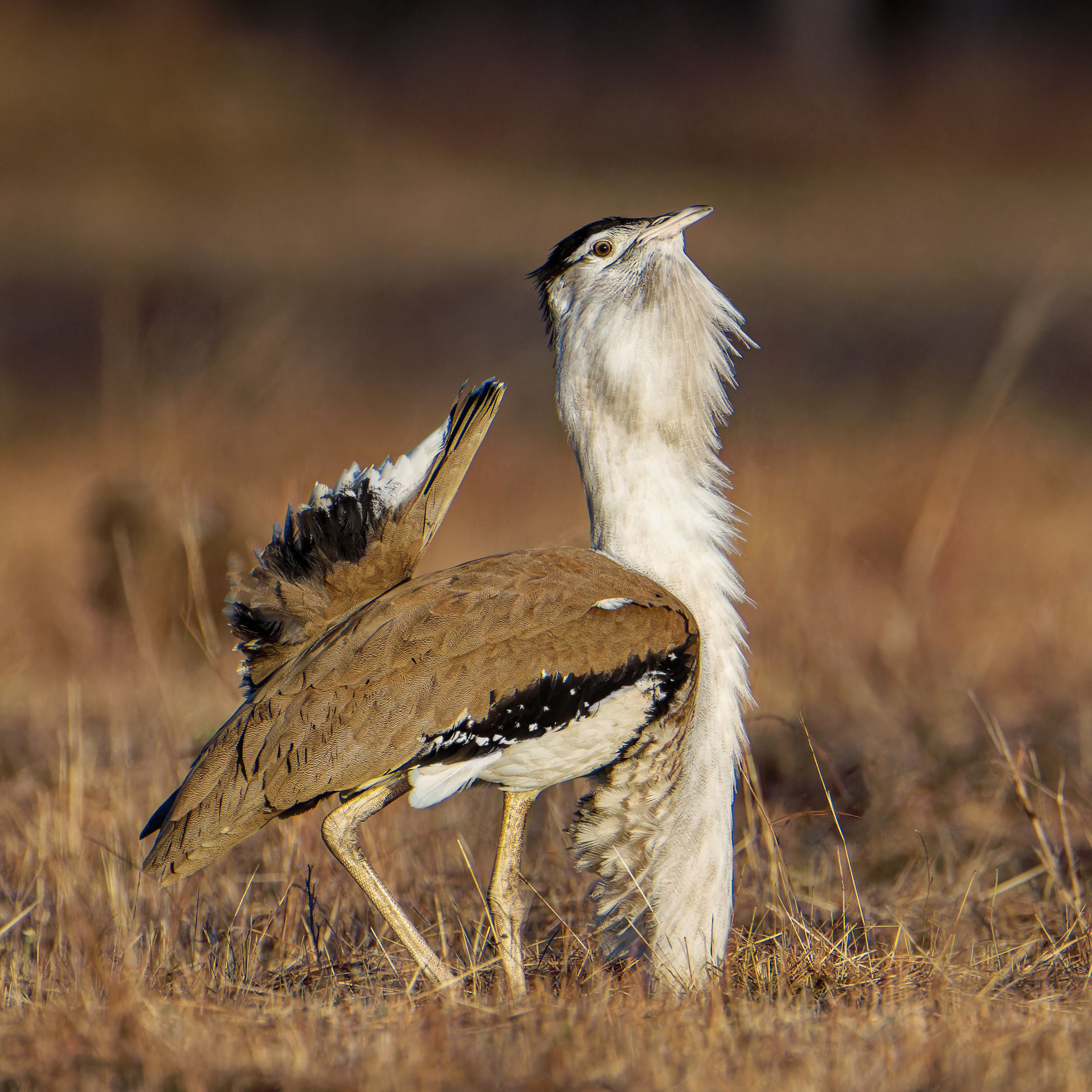
Male in mating display

The species is mostly terrestrial and usually seen walking slowly alone or in pairs. When disturbed, Australian bustards often adopt a cryptic pose with neck erect and bill pointed skywards. They may stalk gradually away or run if alarmed, taking flight as a last resort. When leaving the ground they take to the air with heavy beats of the wings. A brooding female will crouch and move away if disturbed, flightless juveniles will remain still and rely on the camouflage of their plumage to evade detection. Despite the apparent labour in flying, they have strength and stamina that allows them to travel long distances. The roost is at a high point on an open plain or in trees when they are available.

Greater numbers of the bird are seen during the breeding season. The habits of the bird are usually discreet and shy of disturbance, however, the display of males during the breeding season is a conspicuous performance that is accompanied by loud booming. The male is able to expand a sac at the neck to display their longer feathers as a swaying skirt, with the head held proud and upward facing, the wings are pointed toward the ground and tail feathers arched over the back; they stride about an area while adopting this posture and emit deep roaring noises. The voice of the courting male has been transliterated as "who-o-o-o". Males have been observed in close proximity during territorial disputes, using the breeding display and call to challenge each other, but the direct conflict seen in smaller bustard species is rare with this bird. One incident involving physical combat at a height around 25 metres was recorded in Arnhemland, after a period of posturing and chasing by the males in dispute, but this may be unusual behaviour due to the greater risk of injury in this larger species of bustard.

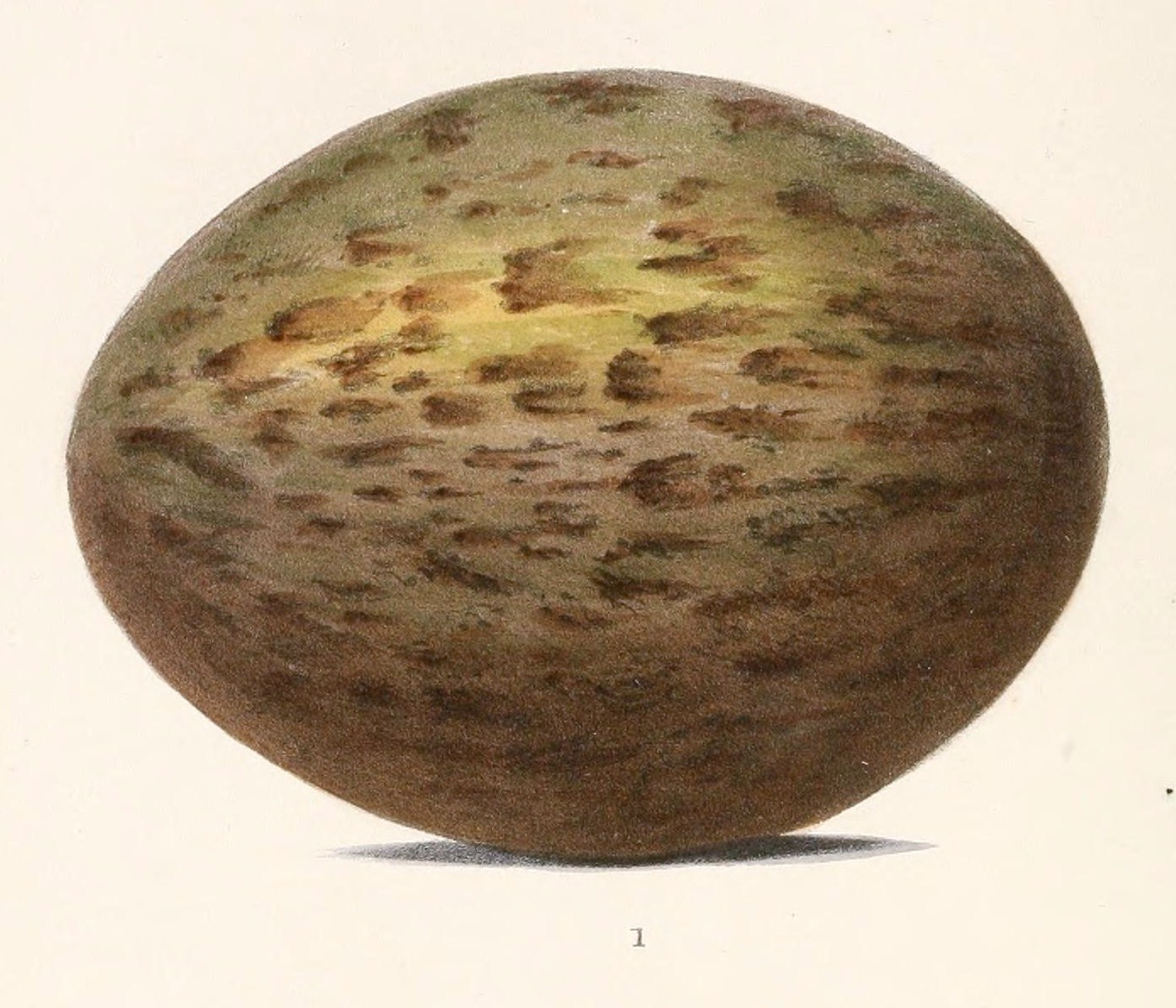
Illustration of egg by Harriet Morgan

Ardeotis australis does not make any attempt to construct a nest. The clutch size is usually one egg, sometimes two, laid close to a small shrub or bush on unadorned ground. The shell is marked with olive-brown blotching and streaks over most of the surface, perhaps more completely covering the larger end of the egg, the background colour is a lighter shade of olive-brown or olive-green. Incubation of the brood is maintained by the female. The dimensions of the egg are 75 × 55 millimetres. The chick will leave the site after emerging from its shell to avoid predation, and relies on the mottled black and brown coloration of their downy plumage to evade detection by squatting and remaining motionless.

Brooding females may be driven from the egg by the raptor Hamirostra melanosternon, the blackbreasted kite, who are able to throw or drop stones to break the shell and feed on the contents; the kite is also known to carry the broken shell to its nest.

The species is strongly attracted to capers, fruit of the plant Capparis nummularia known as myandee or moonflower in the Australian northwest, and this behaviour is exploited by Indigenous peoples who dig pit traps around the bush and wait nearby to capture them. The omnivorous diet includes shoots, roots, leaves, flowerheads, seeds and fruit of plants, a variety of insects, especially grasshoppers, beetles and caterpillars, lizards, young birds and small rodents.

== Distribution and habitat ==
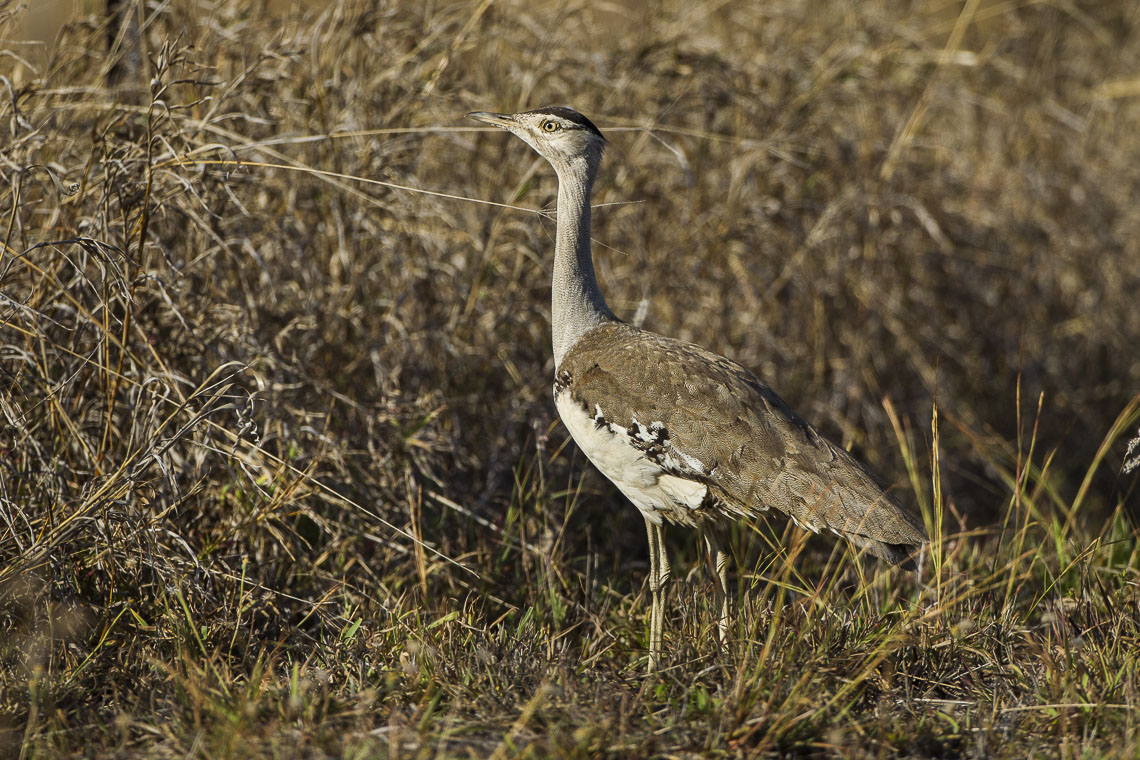
Bustard at Kingfisher Park in Queensland

The distribution range of the species includes a wide area of the Australian continent and occasionally extends to southern parts of Papua New Guinea and Indonesia. The occurrence in the southeast of Australia has contracted and it no longer occurs in areas where it once recorded.

Individual range has been studied by tracking of the birds, via satellite and tagging or community derived surveys, indicating that local populations in wetter regions are more permanent and localised than the greater range of those inhabiting more arid regions. The birds may become locally abundant after land clearing or during outbreaks of grasshoppers. The greatest fidelity to a local region is reported in areas of high rainfall in the north and northwest of Australia.

The habitat favoured by the species is open grasslands, perhaps with some trees, spinifex plains and low shrublands. This bustard will enter denser areas of vegetation after fire, and is observed on artificial cleared areas such as golf courses and farmland.

The historical range in Southwest Australia included the dunes and alluvial flats of the Swan Coastal Plain, as far south as Busselton, and at the interior in what became the Wheatbelt. Vagrants were seen in other areas associated with the higher rainfall forest of the southwest region, although the species avoided forest and densely vegetated areas. Anecdotal reports from residents of the region stated that the species avoided human habitation and pastoral activities, and that over-hunting or land clearing rather than foxes were responsible for their local disappearance. The incidence of historical occurrence in southwest Australia was year round, and sometimes in large flocks.

== Conservation status ==
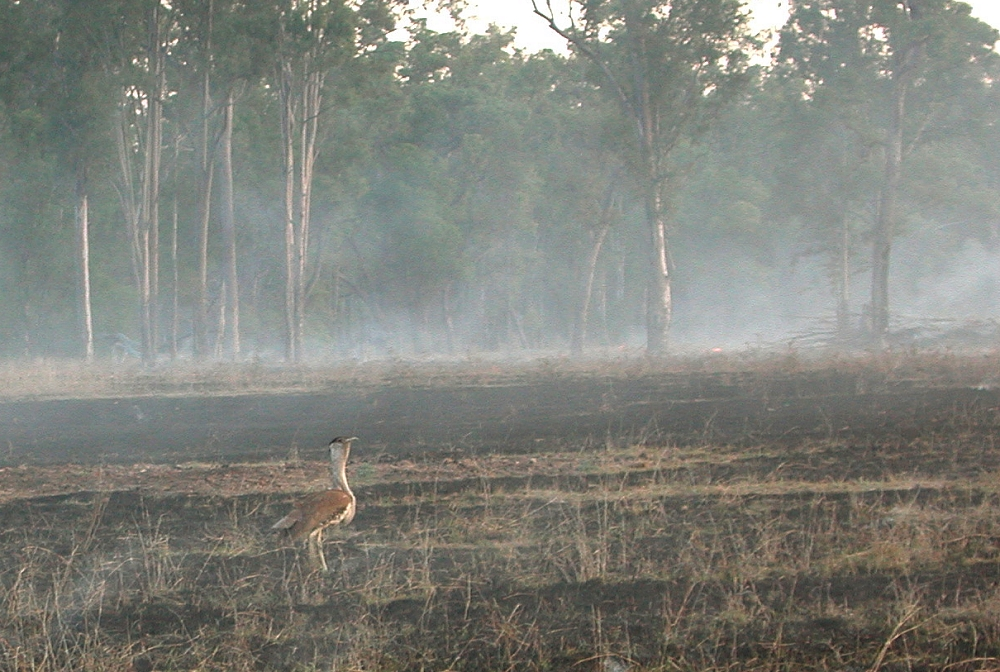
Ardeotis australis in front of a bushfire

This bird remains relatively common and widespread across most of northern Australia (see Atlas), but its range appears to have contracted in the southeast of the continent during the last century, perhaps due to hunting (now illegal except for indigenous Australians), feral predators such as pigs and foxes (Vulpes vulpes) and habitat destruction. The species is very sensitive to disturbance at its breeding sites by humans or cattle and sheep and will desert an area in response. Its nomadic habits make it difficult to assess. In 2012 IUCN downlisted the species to Least Concern.

The assessment of IUCN in 2024 maintained its status as least concern, but noted a declining population trajectory. The total population is thought to exceed 10,000 and be no greater than 100,000 individuals.

The Australian bustard is not listed as threatened on the Environment Protection and Biodiversity Conservation Act 1999.

=== Regional status ===
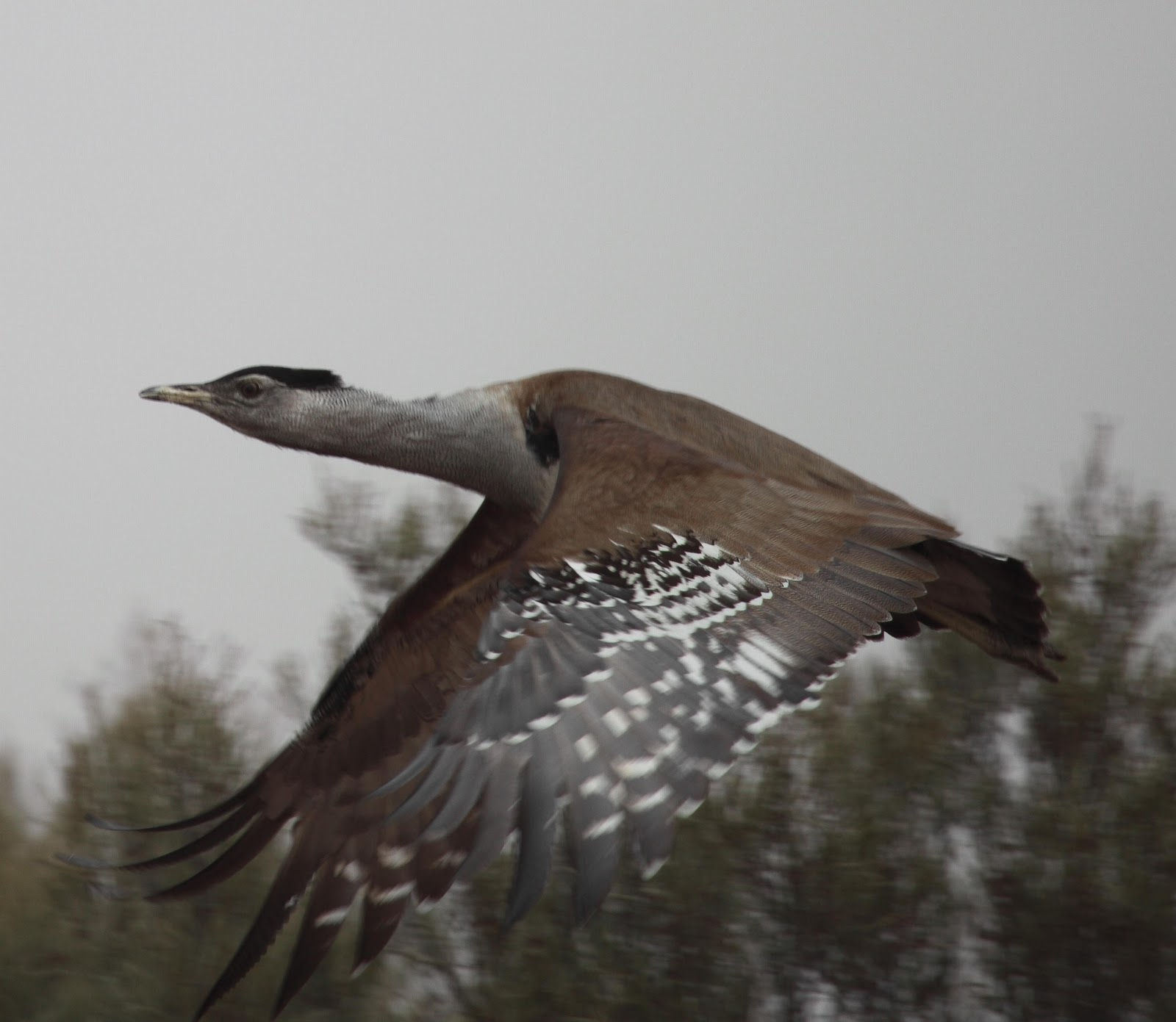
In flight

Ardeotis australis is listed in state conservation registers, providing evaluation and protection to the species under each region's legislation. In Western Australia and the Northern Territory the classification is near threatened by extinction, the states of South Australia and New South Wales record it as endangered, and the status of least concern in Queensland. The Australian bustard is listed as threatened on the Victorian Flora and Fauna Guarantee Act 1988. Under this Act, an Action Statement for the recovery and future management of this species has been prepared. On the 2007 advisory list of threatened vertebrate fauna in Victoria the species is listed as critically endangered, maintaining this advice in the listing published in 2016.

== Cultural references ==
Australian Aboriginals generally refer to this bird as the bush turkey. It is an important food source for Aboriginal people from Central Australia, and is still being killed and eaten today despite its protected status. The white feathers of the bird are used for ceremonial purposes.

There are important Dreaming stories associated with the bush turkey. A number of artists painting in the desert today paint bush turkey Dreaming. This means they have been given stories of the origins of the turkey in the Dreamtime and are entitled to tell this story and paint about it.

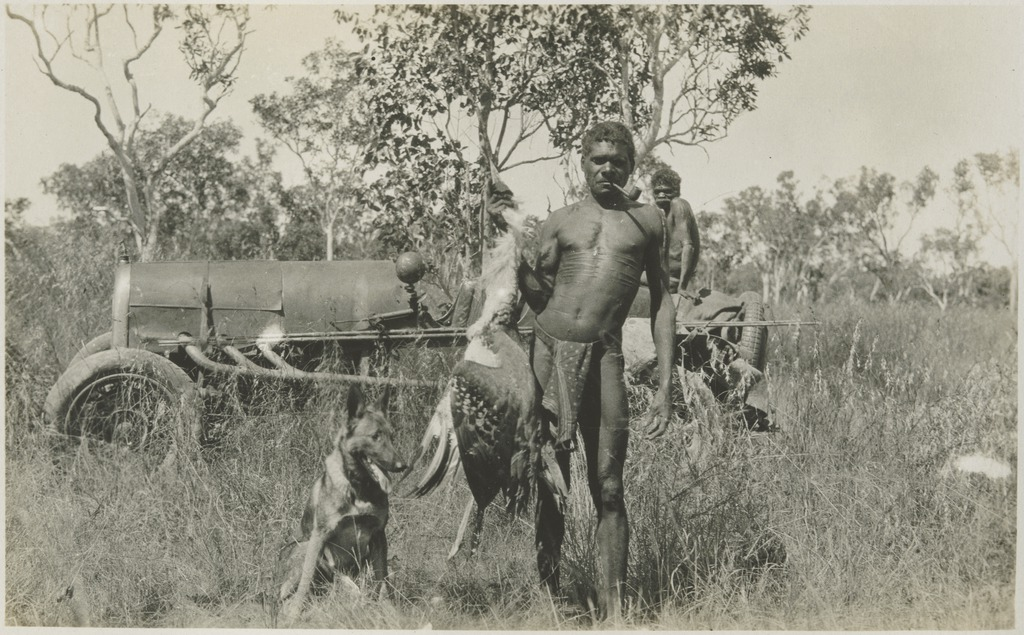
Hunters with a bustard in Arnhemland, circa 1920

Hunting of the bush turkey was noted as difficult, the elusive habits requiring a lot of manoeuvring for a clear target, but greater success was found by the colonists, first from horseback and later from motor vehicles. The bustard was protected by legislation introduced during the later nineteenth century, which included closed seasons for hunting and eventually a prohibition on shooting. The value of the species to agriculture, arriving to control outbreaks of grasshoppers, was acknowledged and promoted to discourage the continued hunting of the bird. Aboriginal peoples were exempted from any prohibition on hunting. The illegal hunting of the bustard continued during the twentieth century. John Gould's early description of the bustard noted the difficulty of shooting of the bird due to their wariness around settled regions, but he was able to stalk and kill the bird more easily in areas remote from the colonies in New South Wales; Gould described the flesh as delicate and well-flavoured.

Bustard Bay, on Queensland's Discovery Coast, was named by Lt. James Cook, who anchored the Endeavour there on 23 May 1770. The next day, he made his second Australian landing, at the location now known as Seventeen Seventy. While investigating the area, Cook's party shot and killed a bustard. It was declared "the best bird we had eaten since we left England" and the bay was named in honor of the bird.

Bustard Head, at the Northern end of the bay, is the site of the first lighthouse erected in Queensland (1868).

Barossa Valley winery Turkey Flat takes its name from the Australian bustard. 'Turkey Flat' was the local name given to Lot 1, 100 of Moorooroo (where the winery now sits) on settlement in reference to the large flocks of the Australian bustard found along the river banks. The winery's logo features an Australian bustard as drawn by renowned local artist, Rod Schubert.
