= Sara Hallager =

American ornithologist

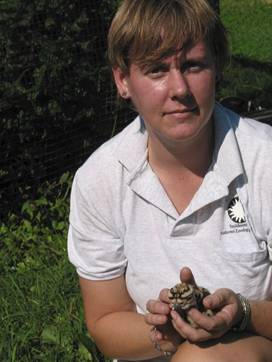
- Sara Hallager
- Education: University of Maryland, College Park
- Occupation: Ornithologist
- Years active: 1987–present
- Employer: Smithsonian National Zoo

Sara Hallager is an American biologist in avian management and husbandry, specializing in the care and conservation of flamingos and kori bustards. She is curator of birds at the Smithsonian National Zoo.

== Education ==
Hallager holds a Bachelor of Science degree in zoology from the University of Maryland, College Park.

== Career ==
Hallager is curator of birds of the Smithsonian National Zoo in Washington, D.C. where she oversees a team responsible for the well-being, reproduction, and conservation of the zoo's diverse bird population. In this role, she is also the keeper of the International Studbook for the Kori Bustard (Ardeotis kori) and the International Studbook for the Buff-Crested Bustard (Lophotis gindiana), official records of the animals' history published in the International Zoo Yearbook by the Zoological Society of London. Hallager has worked at the Smithsonian National Zoo since 1987.

Hallager is active with a variety of scientific organizations. She is the former chair of the Avian Scientific Advisory Group. She serves on the advisory board for the Conservation Centers for Species Survival, and she led the organization's efforts to conserve North American songbirds. Hallager also contributes to the Kori Bustard Species Survival Plan, a program managed by the Association of Zoos and Aquariums.

== Publications ==
- Hutchins, M.; Marra, P.; Diebold, E.; Kreger, M.; Hallager, S. & Lynch, C. (2018). "The evolving role of zoological parks and aquariums in migratory bird conservation". Zoo Biology. 37 (5): 360–368.
- Marrow, J.; Hallager, S.; Sander, S.; Sander, W.; Hanselmann, R. & Murray, S. (2018). "Comparison of Serum Iron, Total Iron Binding Capacity and Percent Saturation in Wild and Captive kori bustards (Ardeotis kori)". Journal of Zoo and Wildlife Medicine. 49 (2): 450–453.
- Smith, L.; Hallager, S.; Kendrick, E.; Hope, K. & Danner, R. M. (2018). "Husbandry of wild-caught song sparrows (Melospiza melodia)". Zoo Biology. 37 (4): 206–209.
- Patil, P.; Rahmani, A. & Hallager, S. (2013). "Behavioural Ethogram of the Great Indian Bustard Ardeotis nigriceps (Vigors) 1831". Journal of the Bombay Natural History Society. 110 (1): 22–34.
- Hanselmann, R.; Hallager, S.; Murray, S. & Mazet, J. (2013). "Causes of Morbidity and Mortality in Captive Kori Bustards (Ardeotis kori) in the United States". Journal of Zoo and Wildlife Medicine. 44 (2): 348–363.
- Penfold, L.; Hallager, S.; Boylan, J.; de Wit, M.; Metrione, L. & Oliva, M. (2013). "Differences in Fecal Androgen Patterns of Breeding and Nonbreeding Kori Bustards (Ardeotis kori)". Zoo Biology. 32 (1): 54–62.
- Miller, J. M.; Hallager, S.; Monfort, S. L.; Newby, J. G.; Bishop, K.; Tidmus, S. A.; Black, P. G.; Houston, B.; Matthee, C. A. & Fleischer, R. C. (2010). "Phylogeographic analysis of nuclear and mtDNA supports subspecies designations in the ostrich (Struthio camelus)". Conservation Genetics. 12: 423–431.
- Hallager, S. & Lichtenberg, E. M. (2007). "New display behavior in male kori bustard (Ardeotis kori struthiunculus)". The Wilson Journal of Ornithology. 119 (4): 750–755. doi:10.1676/06-012.1
