= Emmanuel Le Maout =

French naturalist (1799–1877)

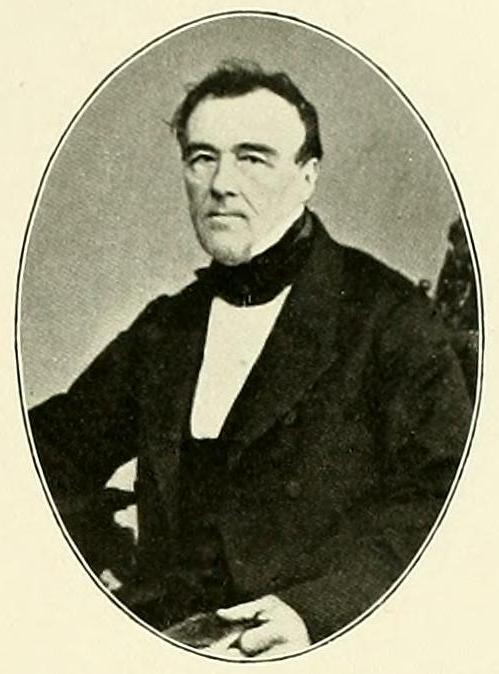
Emmanuel Le Maout (1799–1877)

Jean-Emmanuel-Marie Le Maout (29 December 1799, Guingamp – 23 June 1877, Paris) was a French naturalist.

In 1842, Le Maout qualified as a physician at the University of Paris, where he became a demonstrator of natural sciences in the Faculty of Medicine. Later he gave private lessons in literature and natural history. He was decorated with the Légion d'honneur in 1869.

in 1854, botanist Hugh Algernon Weddell published Maoutia which is a genus of shrubs or small trees in the nettle family (Urticaceae) and named in his honour.

== Works ==
- Le Jardin des Plantes (1842, 2 vol. in-8), with Louis Couailhac (1810–1885) and Pierre Bernard (1810–1876).
- Cahiers de physique, de chimie et d'histoire naturelle (1841, in-4)
- Leçons analytiques de lecture à haute voix (1842, in-8; nouvelle édition, 1856)
- Leçons élémentaires de botanique, précédées d'un Spécimen, en 1843 (2 part, avec 500 gravures, 1845, 3e édition, 1867)
- Atlas élémentaire de botanique (1848, 1684 fig.), avec texte en regard
- Les Mammifères et les Oiseaux (1851–1854, 2 vol. gr. in-8, illustrés), belle publication d'où l'éditeur a tiré ses principaux envois à l'Exposition universelle de 1855
- Flore élémentaire des jardins et des champs (1855, in-18, 2e édition, 1865)
- Traité général de botanique (1867, in-4, 5 500 figures) avec Joseph Decaisne (1807–1882). English edition 1873.
- Les Trois Règnes de la Nature Tournefort Linné Jussieu (Curmer, 1851).

== Bibliography ==
- Le Maout, Emmanuel; Decaisne, Joseph (1873) [1867]. Hooker, Joseph Dalton (ed.). A General System of Botany, Descriptive and Analytical in two parts [Traité général de botanique]. trans. Frances Harriet Hooker. London: Longmans Green.
