= List of bustards =

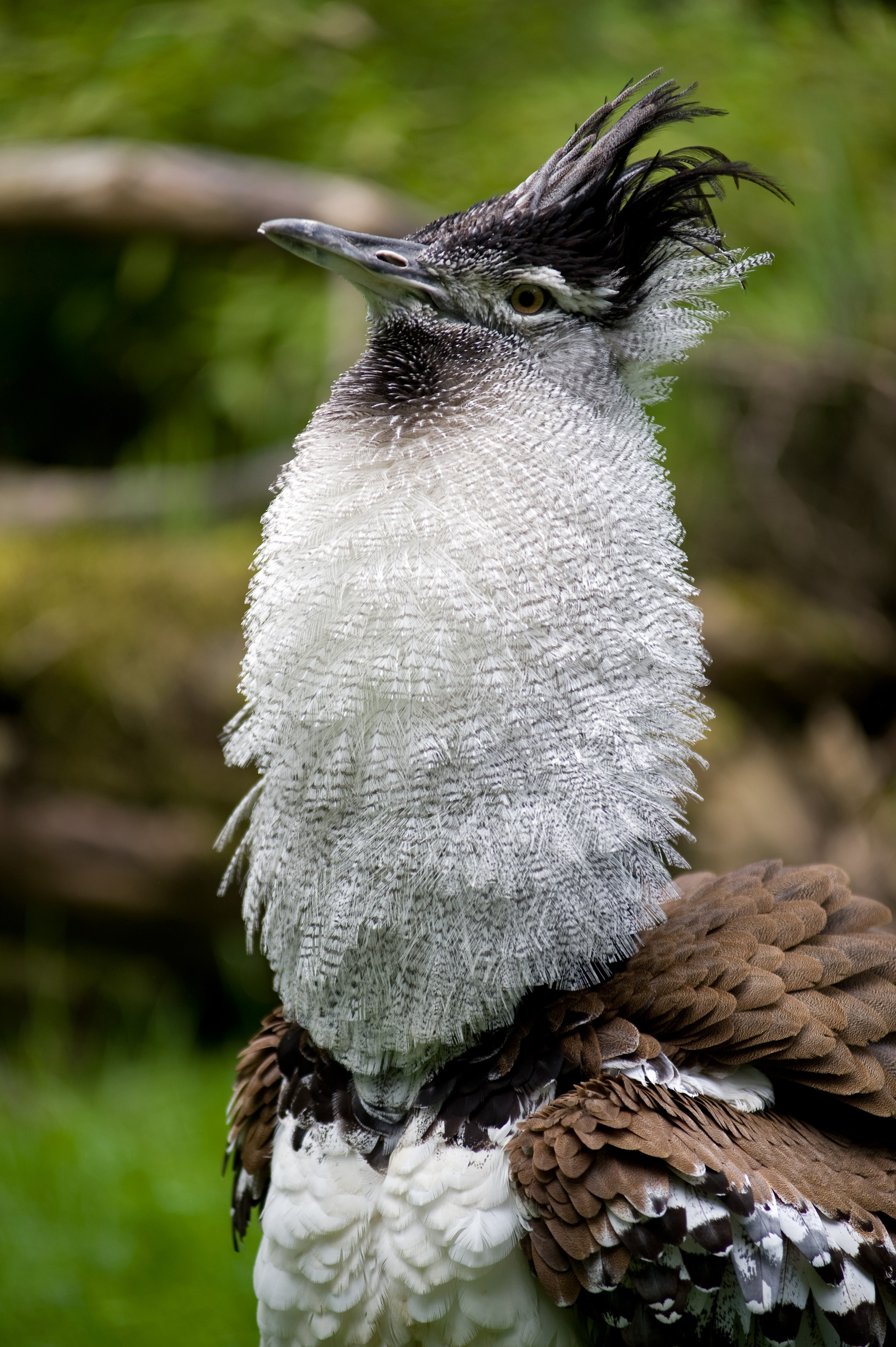
Kori bustard

Bustards are birds in the family Otididae in the monotypic order Otidiformes. There are currently 26 extant species of bustards recognised by the International Ornithologists' Union. Many species of fossil bustards are known from the Miocene onwards; however, their exact number and taxonomy are unsettled due to ongoing discoveries.

== Conventions ==
IUCN Red List categories
Conservation status
- EX: Extinct (0 species)
- EW: Extinct in the wild (0 species)
- CR: Critically endangered (3 species)
- EN: Endangered (2 species)
- VU: Vulnerable (4 species)
- NT: Near threatened (6 species)
- LC: Least concern (11 species)

Conservation status codes listed follow the International Union for Conservation of Nature (IUCN) Red List of Threatened Species. Range maps are provided wherever possible; if a range map is not available, a description of the bustard's range is provided. Ranges are based on the IOC World Bird List for that species unless otherwise noted. Population estimates are of the number of mature individuals and are taken from the IUCN Red List.

This list follows the taxonomic treatment (designation and order of species) and nomenclature (scientific and common names) of version 13.2 of the IOC World Bird List. Where the taxonomy proposed by the IOC World Bird List conflicts with the taxonomy followed by the IUCN (Note: The IUCN follows the taxonomy proposed by the HBW and BirdLife Taxonomic Checklist.) or the 2023 edition of The Clements Checklist of Birds of the World, the disagreement is noted next to the species's common name (for nomenclatural disagreements) or scientific name (for taxonomic disagreements).

== Classification ==
The International Ornithologists' Union (IOU) recognises 26 species of bustards in twelve genera. This list does not include hybrid species, extinct prehistoric species, or putative species not yet accepted by the IOU.

Family Otididae

- Genus Otis: one species
- Genus Ardeotis: four species
- Genus Chlamydotis: two species
- Genus Neotis: four species
- Genus Eupodotis: two species
- Genus Heterotetrax: three species
- Genus Lophotis: three species
- Genus Afrotis: two species
- Genus Lissotis: two species
- Genus Houbaropsis: one species
- Genus Sypheotides: one species
- Genus Tetrax: one species

== Bustards ==
Genus Otis – Linnaeus, 1758 – 1 species
Common name	Scientific name and subspecies	Range	IUCN status and estimated population
Great bustard	O. tarda Linnaeus, 1758 Two subspecies: O. t. tarda; O. t. dybowskii	Palearctic	EN 44,000–57,000

Genus Ardeotis – Le Maout, 1853 – 4 species
Common name	Scientific name and subspecies	Range	IUCN status and estimated population
Arabian bustard	A. arabs (Linnaeus, 1758) Four subspecies: A. a. lynesi; A. a. stieberi; A. a. arabs; A. a. butleri	Africa and Middle East	NT Unknown
Kori bustard	A. kori (Burchell, 1822) Two subspecies: A. k. struthiunculus; A. k. kori	Africa	NT Unknown
Great Indian bustard	A. nigriceps (Vigors, 1831)	India	CR 50–249
Australian bustard	A. australis (Gray, J. E., 1829)	Australia and New Guinea	LC 6,700–67,000

Genus Chlamydotis – Lesson, R. P., 1839 – 2 species
Common name	Scientific name and subspecies	Range	IUCN status and estimated population
Houbara bustard	C. undulata (Jacquin, 1784) Two subspecies: C. u. fuertaventurae; C. u. undulata	North Africa	VU 13,000–33,000
MacQueen's bustard	C. macqueenii (Gray, J. E., 1832)	Asia	VU 33,000–67,000

Genus Neotis – Sharpe, 1893 – 4 species
Common name	Scientific name and subspecies	Range	IUCN status and estimated population
Ludwig's bustard	N. ludwigii (Rüppell, 1837)	Southern Africa	EN 100,000–499,999
Denham's bustard	N. denhami (Children and Vigors, 1826) Three subspecies: N. d. denhami; N. d. jacksoni; N. d. stanleyi	Africa	NT Unknown
Heuglin's bustard	N. heuglinii (Hartlaub, 1859)	East Africa	LC Unknown
Nubian bustard	N. nuba (Cretzschmar, 1826)	Africa	VU Unknown

Genus Eupodotis – Lesson, R. P., 1839 – 2 species
Common name	Scientific name and subspecies	Range	IUCN status and estimated population
White-bellied bustard	E. senegalensis (Vieillot, 1821) Five subspecies: E. s. senegalensis; E. s. canicollis; E. s. erlangeri; E. s. mackenziei; E. s. barrowii	Africa	LC Unknown
Blue korhaan	E. caerulescens (Vieillot, 1821)	South Africa and Lesotho	NT 8,000–10,000

Genus Heterotetrax – Sharpe, 1894 – 3 species
Common name	Scientific name and subspecies	Range	IUCN status and estimated population
Karoo korhaan	H. vigorsii (Smith, A., 1831) Two subspecies: H. v. namaqua; H. v. vigorsii	Africa	LC Unknown
Rüppell's korhaan	H. rueppelii (Wahlberg, 1856) Two subspecies: H. r. rueppelii; H. r. fitzsimonsi	Namibia and Angola	LC Unknown
Little brown bustard	H. humilis (Blyth, 1855)	Ethiopia and Somalia	NT Unknown

Genus Lophotis – Reichenbach, 1848 – 3 species
Common name	Scientific name and subspecies	Range	IUCN status and estimated population
Savile's bustard	L. savilei Lynes, 1920	Africa	LC Unknown
Buff-crested bustard	L. gindiana (Oustalet, 1881)	East Africa	LC Unknown
Red-crested korhaan	L. ruficrista (Smith, A., 1836)	Southern Africa	LC Unknown

Genus Afrotis – Gray, G. R., 1855 – 2 species
Common name	Scientific name and subspecies	Range	IUCN status and estimated population
Southern black korhaan	A. afra (Linnaeus, 1758)	South Africa	VU Unknown
Northern black korhaan	A. afraoides (Smith, A., 1831) Three subspecies: A. a. etoschae; A. a. damarensis; A. a. afraoides	Southern Africa	LC Unknown

Genus Lissotis – Reichenbach, 1848 – 2 species
Common name	Scientific name and subspecies	Range	IUCN status and estimated population
Black-bellied bustard	L. melanogaster (Rüppell, 1835) Two subspecies: L. m. melanogaster; L. m. notophila	Africa	LC Unknown
Hartlaub's bustard	L. hartlaubii (Heuglin, 1863)	East Africa	LC Unknown

Genus Houbaropsis – Sharpe, 1893 – 1 species
Common name	Scientific name and subspecies	Range	IUCN status and estimated population
Bengal florican	H. bengalensis (Müller, P. L. S., 1776) Two subspecies: H. b. bengalensis; H. b. blandini	Southeast Asia and northeastern South Asia	CR 250–999

Genus Sypheotides – Lesson, R. P., 1839 – 1 species
Common name	Scientific name and subspecies	Range	IUCN status and estimated population
Lesser florican	S. indicus (Miller, J. F., 1782)	India	CR 356–1,228

Genus Tetrax – Forster, T., 1817 – 1 species
Common name	Scientific name and subspecies	Range	IUCN status and estimated population
Little bustard	T. tetrax (Linnaeus, 1758)	Palearctic of Asia, Europe, and North Africa	NT 100,000–499,999
