= Black korhaan =

The black korhaans are two closely related species of bustard:

- Northern black korhaan (Afrotis afraoides), also known as the white-quilled bustard
- Southern black korhaan (Afrotis afra)
