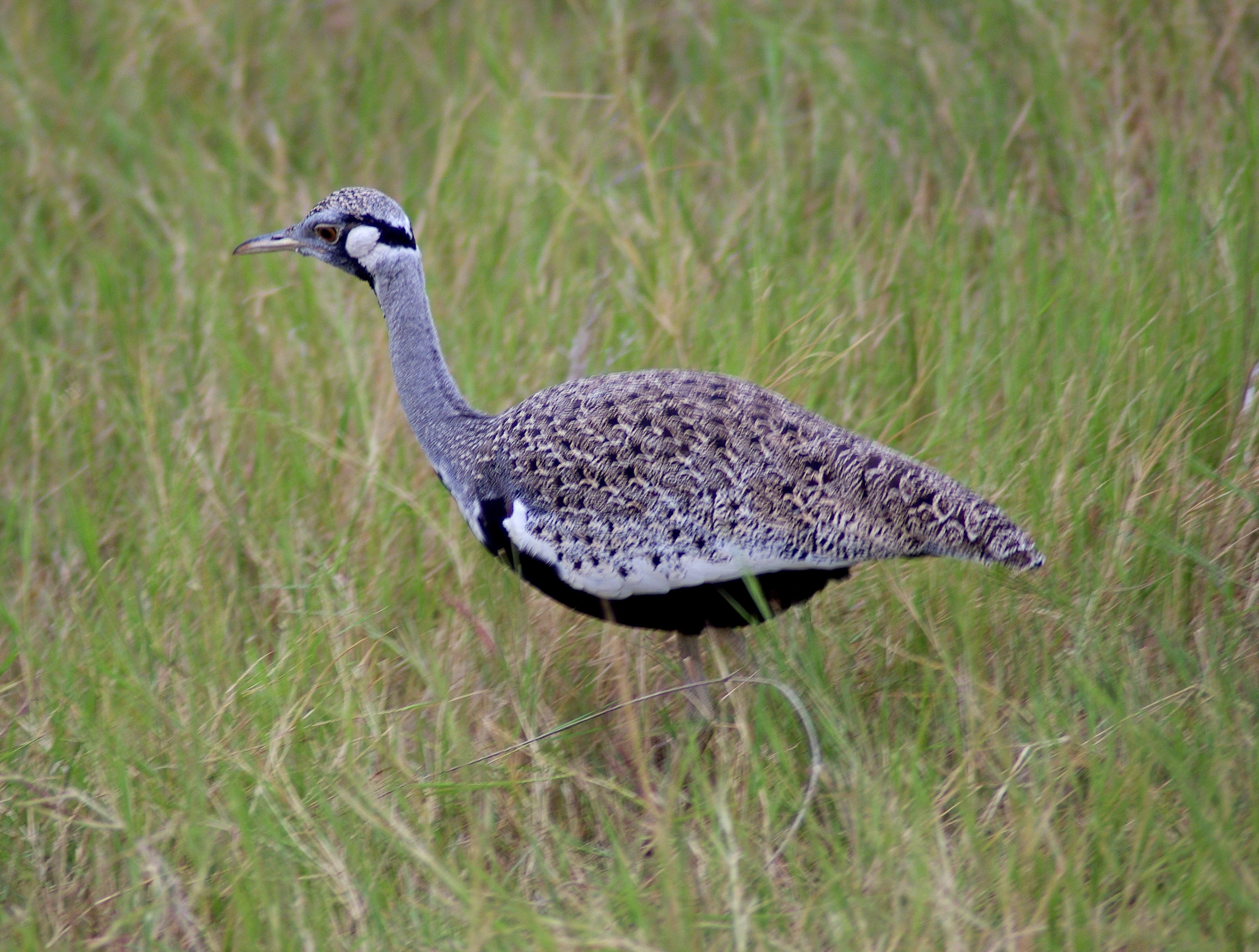
- Adult male Hartlaub's bustard (Lissotis hartlaubii)

Scientific classification
- Kingdom: Animalia
- Phylum: Chordata
- Class: Aves
- Order: Otidiformes
- Family: Otididae
- Genus: Lissotis; Reichenbach, 1848

Type species
- Otis melanogaster Rüppell, 1835

= Lissotis =

Genus of birds

Lissotis is a genus of bird in the bustard family, Otididae. Some authorities, such as the IUCN, consider it part of Eupodotis; the separation adopted here follows the Handbook of the Birds of the World.

== Species ==
It contains the following species, both restricted to Africa:

Genus Lissotis – Reichenbach, 1848 – two species
Common name	Scientific name and subspecies	Range	Size and ecology	IUCN status and estimated population
Black-bellied bustard	Lissotis melanogaster (Rüppell, 1835) Two subspecies: L. m. notophila Oberholser 1905; L. m. melanogaster (Rüppell 1835)	Sub-Saharan Africa	Size: Habitat: Diet:	LC
Hartlaub's bustard	Lissotis hartlaubii (Heuglin, 1863)	Ethiopia, Kenya, Somalia, Sudan, Tanzania, and Uganda.	Size: Habitat: Diet:	LC
