= Little brown bustard =

Conservation status
- Near Threatened (IUCN 3.1)
- CITES Appendix II

Scientific classification
- Kingdom: Animalia
- Phylum: Chordata
- Class: Aves
- Order: Otidiformes
- Family: Otididae
- Genus: Heterotetrax
- Species: H. humilis

Binomial name
- Heterotetrax humilis (Blyth, 1855)

Species of bird

The little brown bustard (Heterotetrax humilis) is a species of bird in the family Otididae. Found in Ethiopia and Somalia, its natural habitats are subtropical or tropical dry shrubland and subtropical or tropical dry lowland grassland. As indicated by its name, this bustard is the world's smallest at 45 cm (18 in) and 600 grams (1.3 lb). It is threatened by habitat destruction.

== Description ==
The smallest species in its genus, the little brown bustard reaches a maximum length of about 45 cm (18 in). They are light brown birds with whitish underparts, long necks and legs, relatively short bills, powder-down and photoreactive porphyrins at the base of feathers, no uropygial gland, no hind toe and nidifugous young.

The male has a black tuft on the nape, and a black throat speckled with white. The female lacks these black areas, instead having heavy buff spotting on the back, wings and breast. Both male and female have dark flight feathers on the wings, and when flying show a slender white wing-bar, which divides the black feathers from the sandy-brown wing coverts. The female white-bellied bustard (Eupodotis senegalensis), which has a wider range, is larger and darker and has bluish-grey colouring on the back of the neck. The call of the little brown bustard is uttered with the neck outstretched and the head thrown back and is a high-pitched, rattling sound.

== Distribution and habitat ==
The little brown bustard is endemic to Horn of Africa, where its range includes southern and eastern Ethiopia and northern and central Somalia. Its typical habitat is dry scrub and open thornbush, and it sometimes moves out onto tussocky plains. It occurs at altitudes of up to 1,500 m (5,000 ft).

== Ecology ==
Bustards are ground dwelling birds, walking briskly on sturdy legs, foraging as they go. They are able to fly but seem to prefer running and walking. The diet of the little brown bustard consists of seeds, buds, insects and small vertebrates such as lizards. The breeding season is from April to August; two eggs (occasionally three) are laid on the ground and incubated by the female.

== Status ==
The total population of this bird is unknown, but its range coincides with an area where war was being waged in the 1970s and 1980s when there was a marked decline in its population. There have also been droughts in the area and disturbances caused by the establishment of refugee camps, hunting, cultivation, and the gathering of firewood so it is likely that some local populations have been eliminated. Although still fairly common in some areas, the general population trend is downwards, and the International Union for Conservation of Nature has assessed the bird's conservation status as "near threatened".
