= Northern black korhaan =

Conservation status
- Least Concern (IUCN 3.1)
- CITES Appendix II

Scientific classification
- Kingdom: Animalia
- Phylum: Chordata
- Class: Aves
- Order: Otidiformes
- Family: Otididae
- Genus: Afrotis
- Species: A. afraoides

Binomial name
- Afrotis afraoides (Smith, 1831)

Synonyms
- Eupodotis afraoides

Species of bird

The northern black korhaan (Afrotis afraoides), also known as the white-quilled bustard, is a species of bird in the bustard family, Otididae. It is widely distributed across Southern Africa. Its habitat is primarily open grassland and scrub.

== Taxonomy ==
The northern black korhaan was first described in 1831 by the Scottish surgeon, explorer and zoologist Andrew Smith, who gave it the specific name "afraoides". He placed it in the genus Eupodotis, where it was one of two species, the other being the southern black korhaan (Eupodotis afra). In 1993, Dowsett and Forbes-Watson listed it as a sub-species of E. afra, while Sibley and Monroe (1990 and 1993) retained it as a separate species. Then in 2014, del Hoyo and Collar transferred both species to the genus Afrotis.

== Description ==
The male's plumage has regularly-arranged black and white barring on the back and wings, the head, neck and underparts being black. The female has the head, neck, breast and upper parts barred or chequered in black and buff, the belly being black. The primary feathers are largely white, which distinguishes this species from the southern black korhaan where they are black. Both the female and the male have red beaks and bright yellow legs.

== Distribution and habitat ==
The northern black korhaan is found in Namibia, Botswana, Lesotho and northern South Africa. Its habitat is grassland, with vegetation up to a metre high, grassy dunes, semi-arid scrubland and open veldt.

== Ecology ==
The northern black korhaan is a mainly ground-dwelling bird, but it does sometimes burst into flight when disturbed, the male emitting a loud, raucous "kraark, kraark" call. The male will often run away from an intruder with head and neck extended, before freezing, becoming surprisingly difficult to observe in the process. The female is less conspicuous and is seldom seen. The birds forage while walking along, feeding on and chasing after insects such as termites, ants, grasshoppers and beetles, as well as spiders, ticks and seeds. Breeding takes place at any time of year. The male has a courtship display involving dipping flights, flaring white feathers and the ritual chasing of other birds. He displays to several females but is territorial, and drives away other males. The nest is a scrape on the ground containing one or two eggs.

== Status ==
The International Union for Conservation of Nature has assessed the conservation status of this species as being of "least concern". This is because it is a common species with a wide range, no particular threats have been identified, and the population seems stable.

== Gallery ==
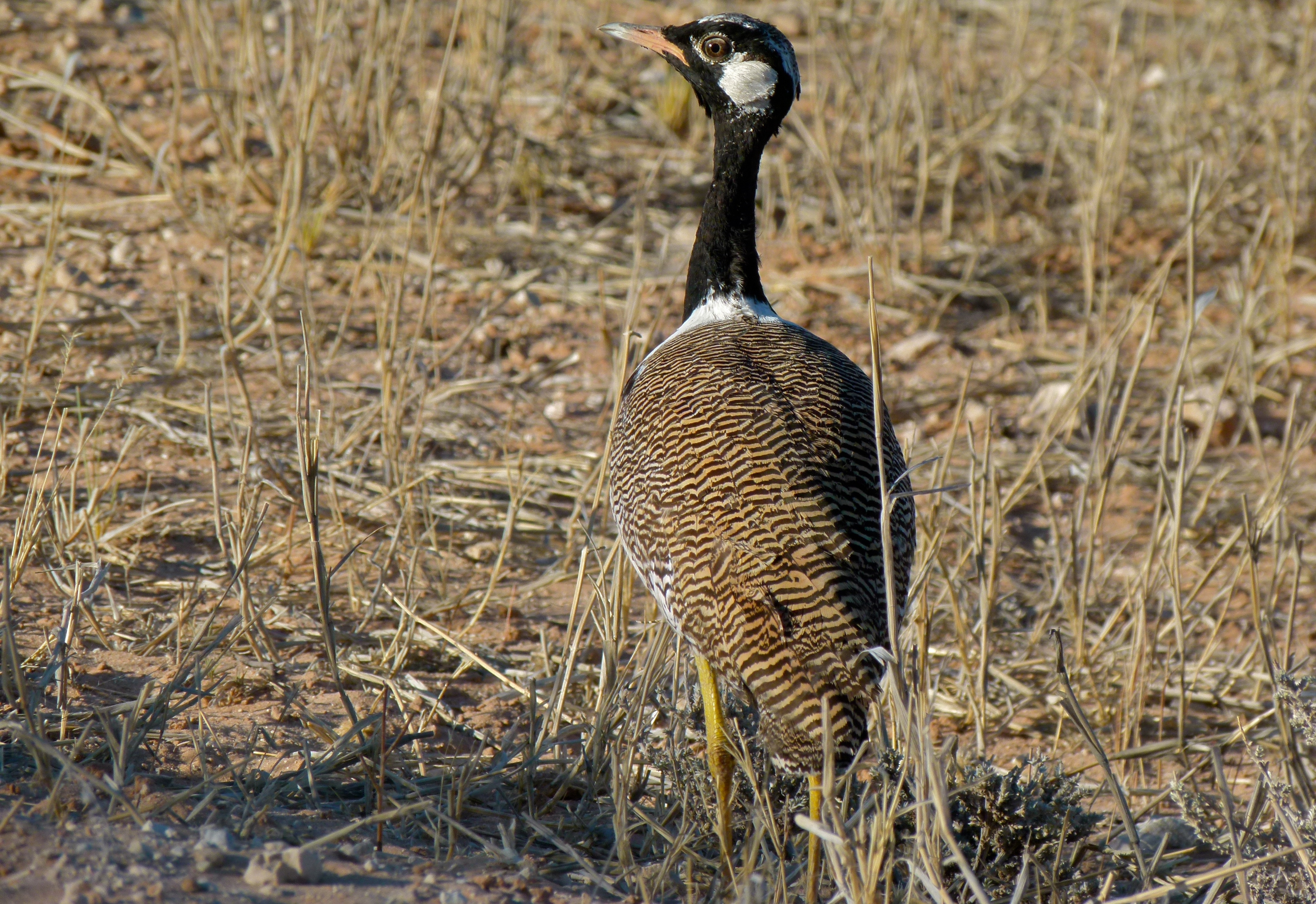
Adult male calling

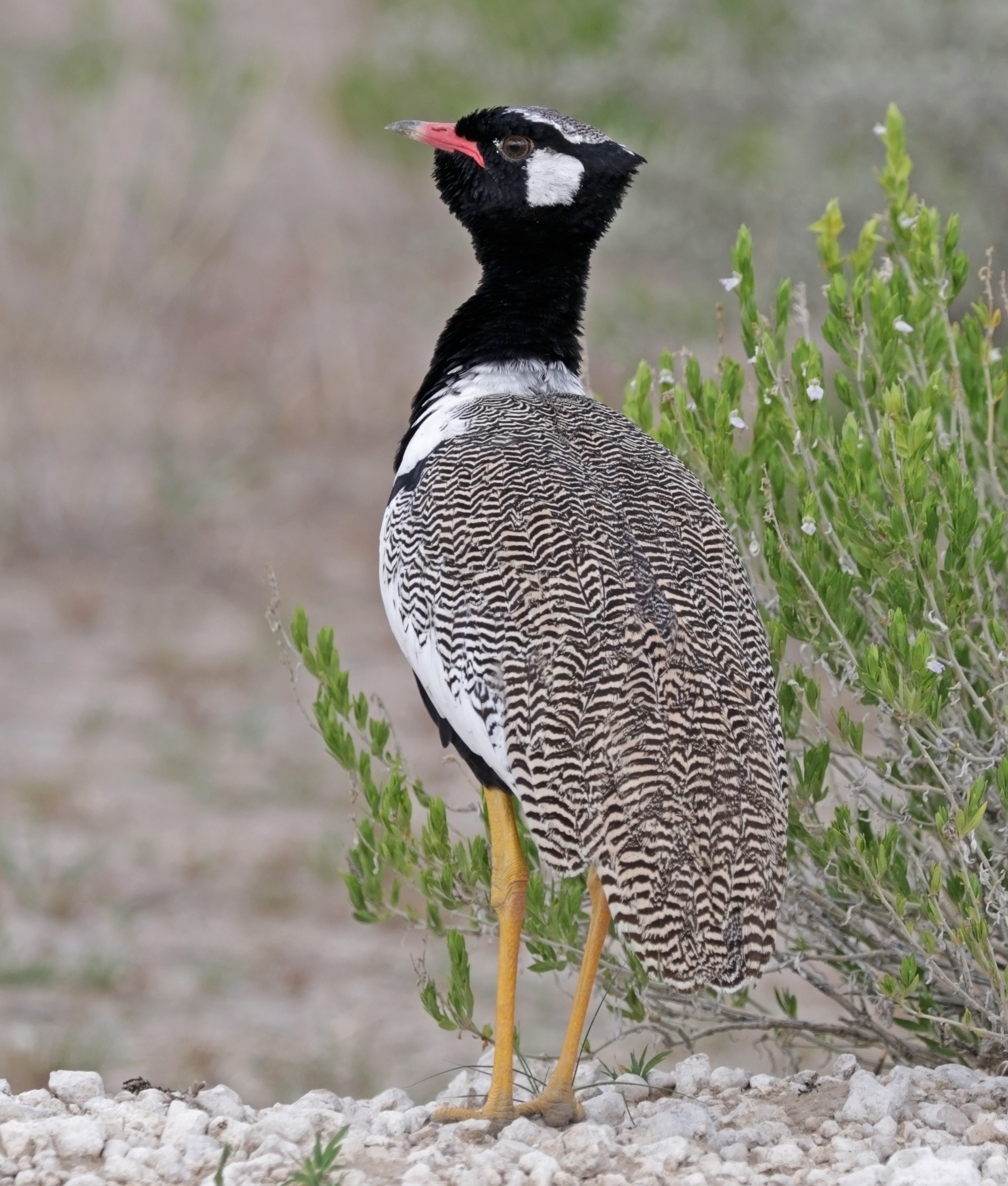
Etosha National Park, Namibia

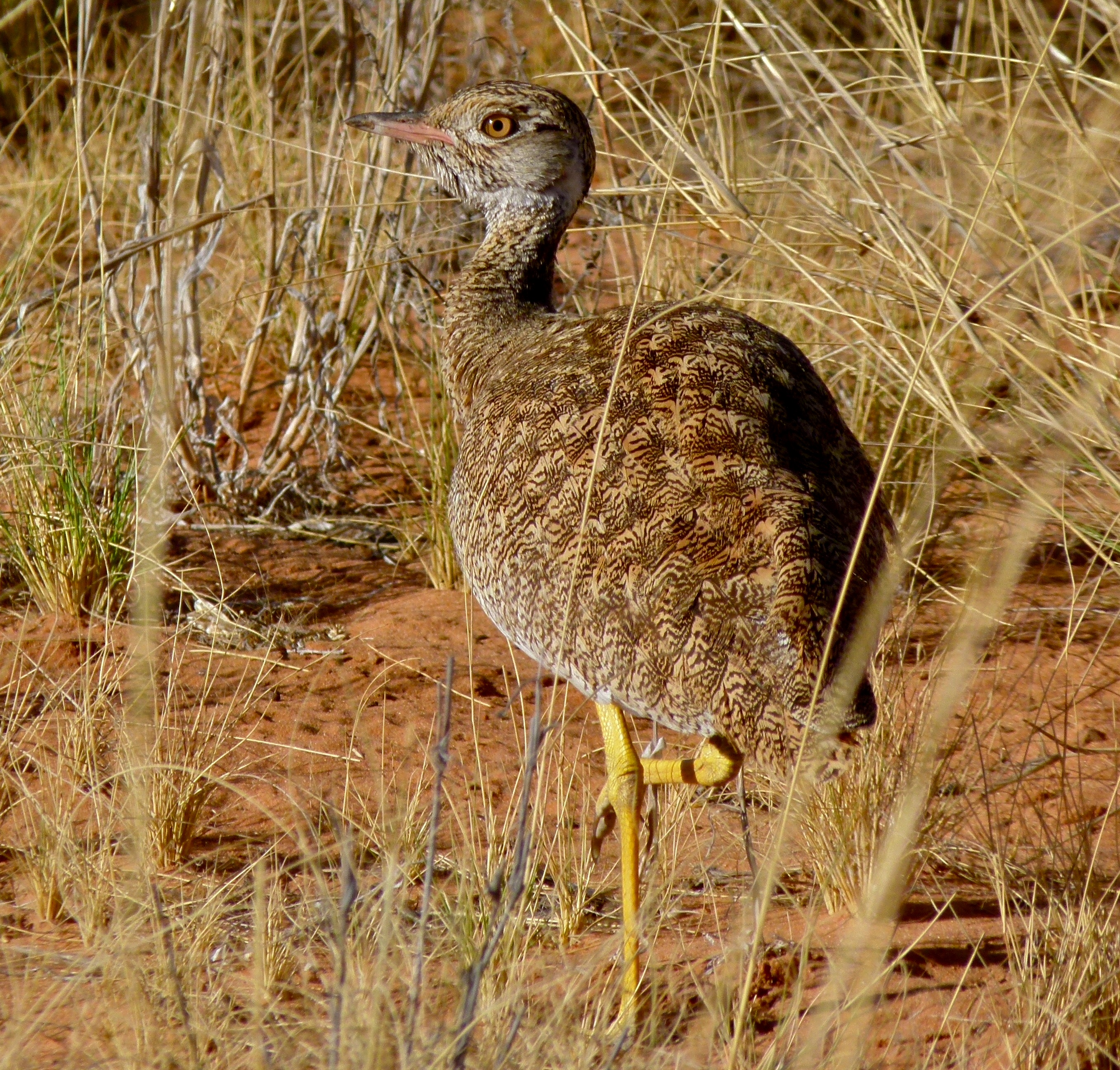
Dorsal view of adult female

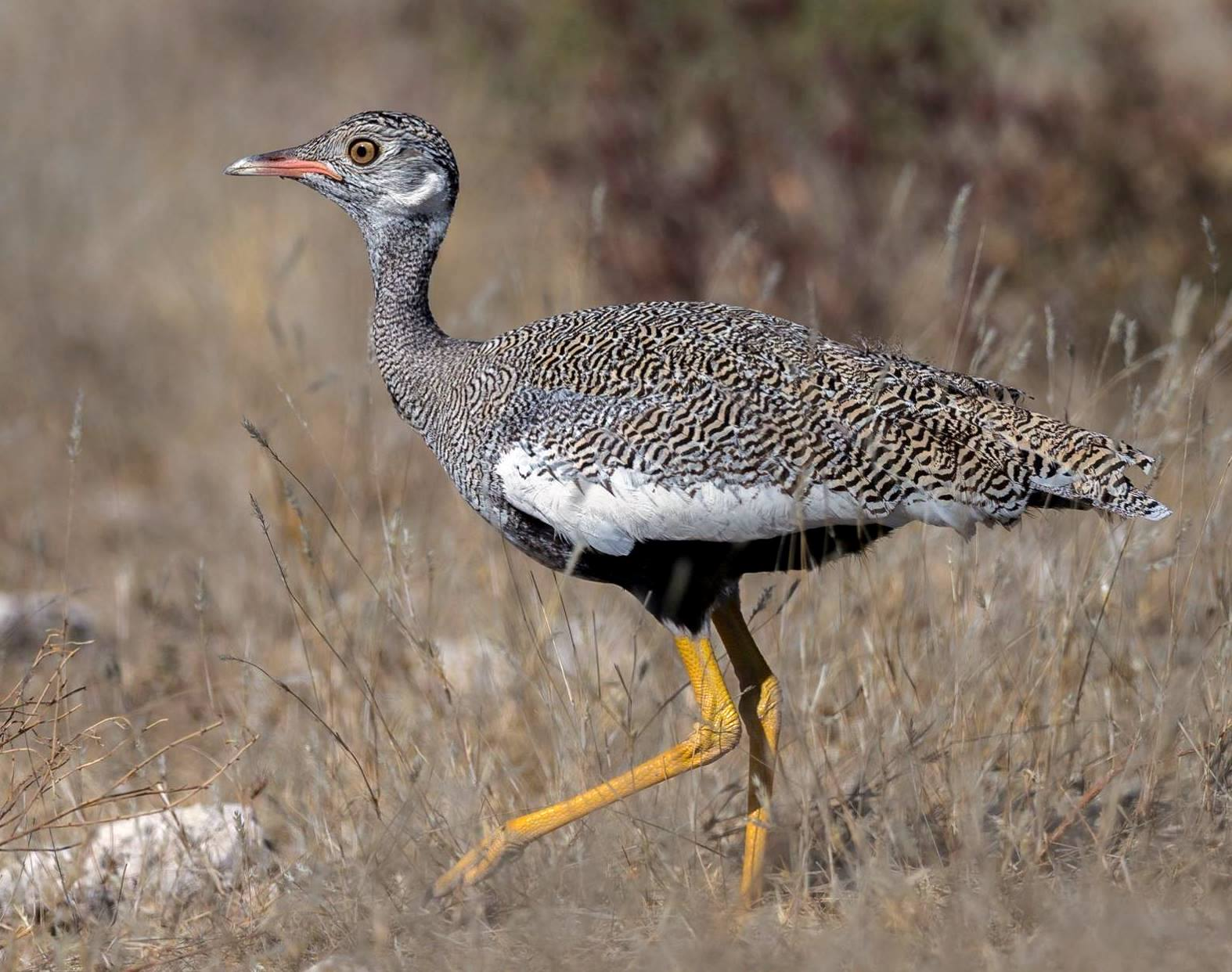
Immature male, less than 7 months old

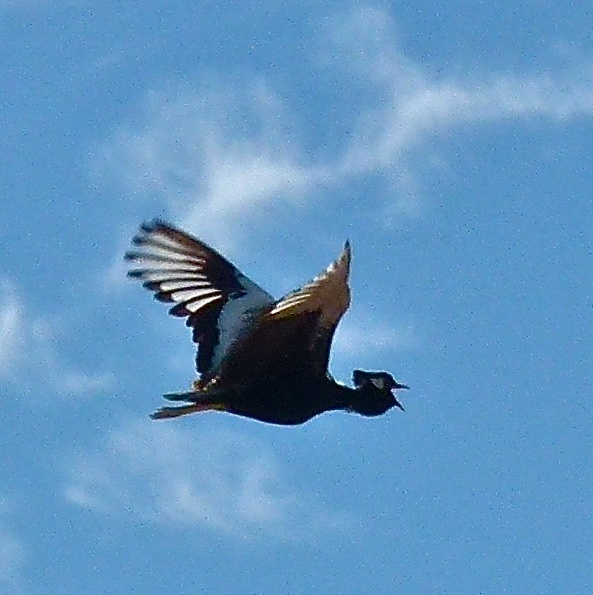
Adult male in flight, showing white inner vanes to remiges
