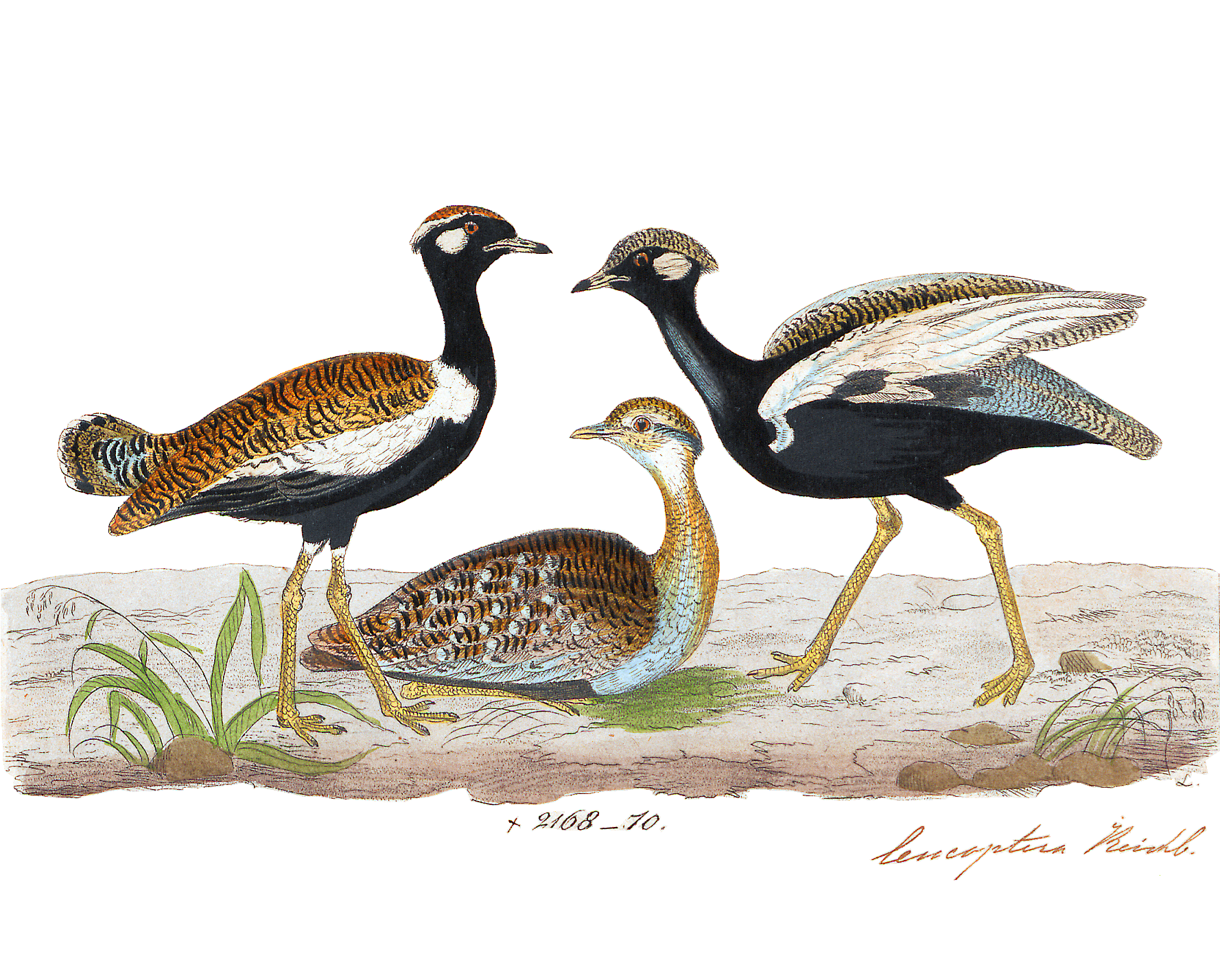
- Afrotis in Iconographia Zoologica

Scientific classification
- Kingdom: Animalia
- Phylum: Chordata
- Class: Aves
- Order: Otidiformes
- Family: Otididae
- Genus: Afrotis; Gray, GR, 1855

Type species
- Otis afra Linnaeus, 1758

Species
- See text

= Afrotis =

Genus of birds

Afrotis is a genus of bustard in the family Otididae. The genus is endemic to southern Africa, and contains two species. It is sometimes included in the genus Eupodotis.

== Species ==
Genus Afrotis – Gray, GR, 1855 – two species
Common name	Scientific name and subspecies	Range	Size and ecology	IUCN status and estimated population
Southern black korhaan	Afrotis afra (Smith, 1831)	Western and southern South Africa, from Little Namaqualand to Cape Town and east to Grahamstown	Size: Habitat: Diet:	VU Unknown
Northern black korhaan	Afrotis afraoides (Linnaeus, 1758) Three subspecies: A. a. etoschae (Grote 1922); A. a. damarensis Roberts 1926; A. a. afraoides (Smith 1831)	Southern Africa.	Size: Habitat: Diet:	LC Unknown
