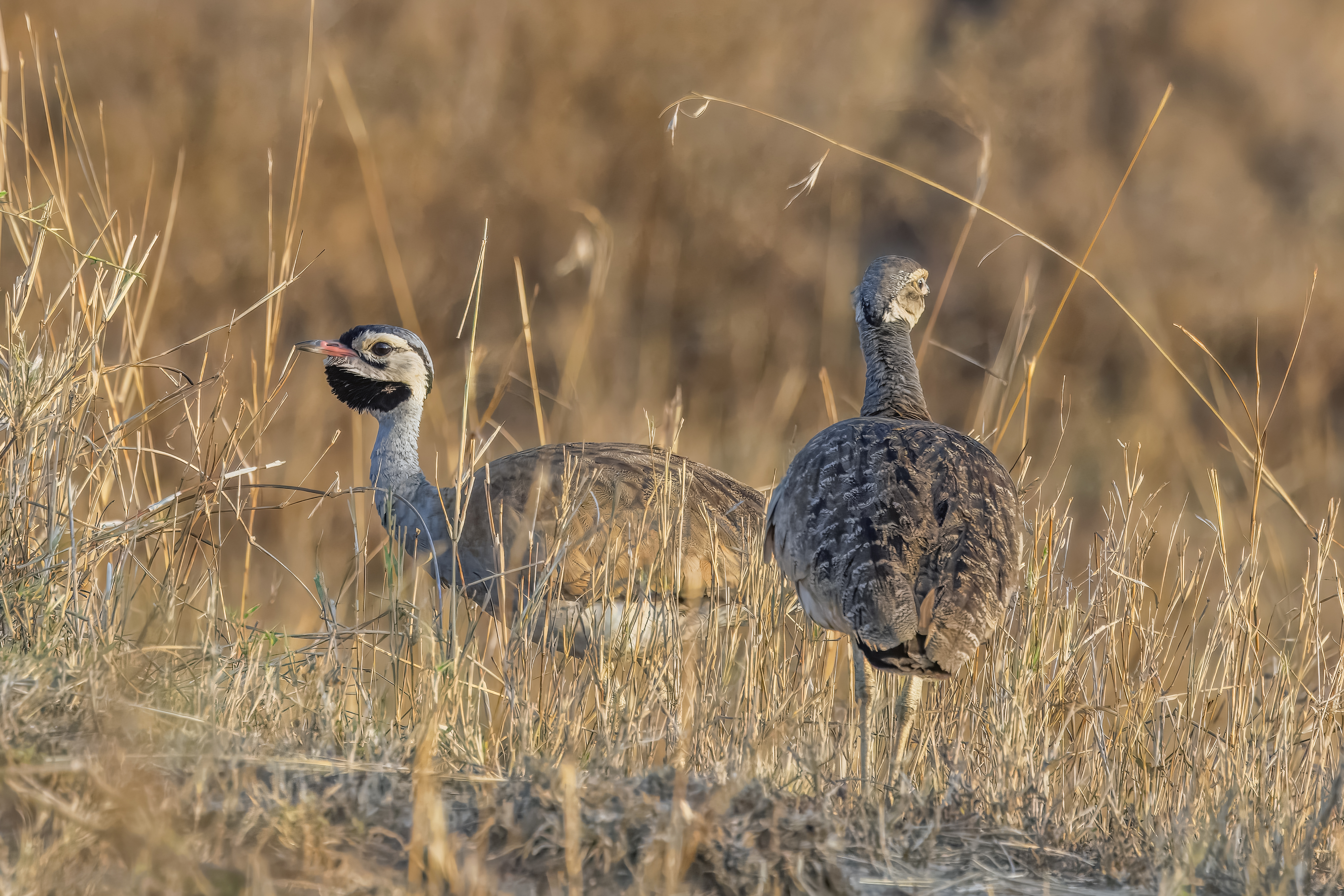
- Male E. s. erlangeri (with female); Serengeti National Park, Tanzania

Conservation status
- Least Concern (IUCN 3.1)
- CITES Appendix II

Scientific classification
- Kingdom: Animalia
- Phylum: Chordata
- Class: Aves
- Order: Otidiformes
- Family: Otididae
- Genus: Eupodotis
- Species: E. senegalensis

Binomial name
- Eupodotis senegalensis (Vieillot, 1821)

Synonyms
- Eupodotis barrowii Eupodotis cafra

= White-bellied bustard =

Species of bird

The white-bellied bustard or white-bellied korhaan (Eupodotis senegalensis) is an African species of bustard. It is widespread in sub-Saharan Africa in grassland and open woodland habitats. Despite its wide distribution and easily identifiable characteristics, very few studies have been conducted on this species and little is known about its life history and behavior.

== Description ==
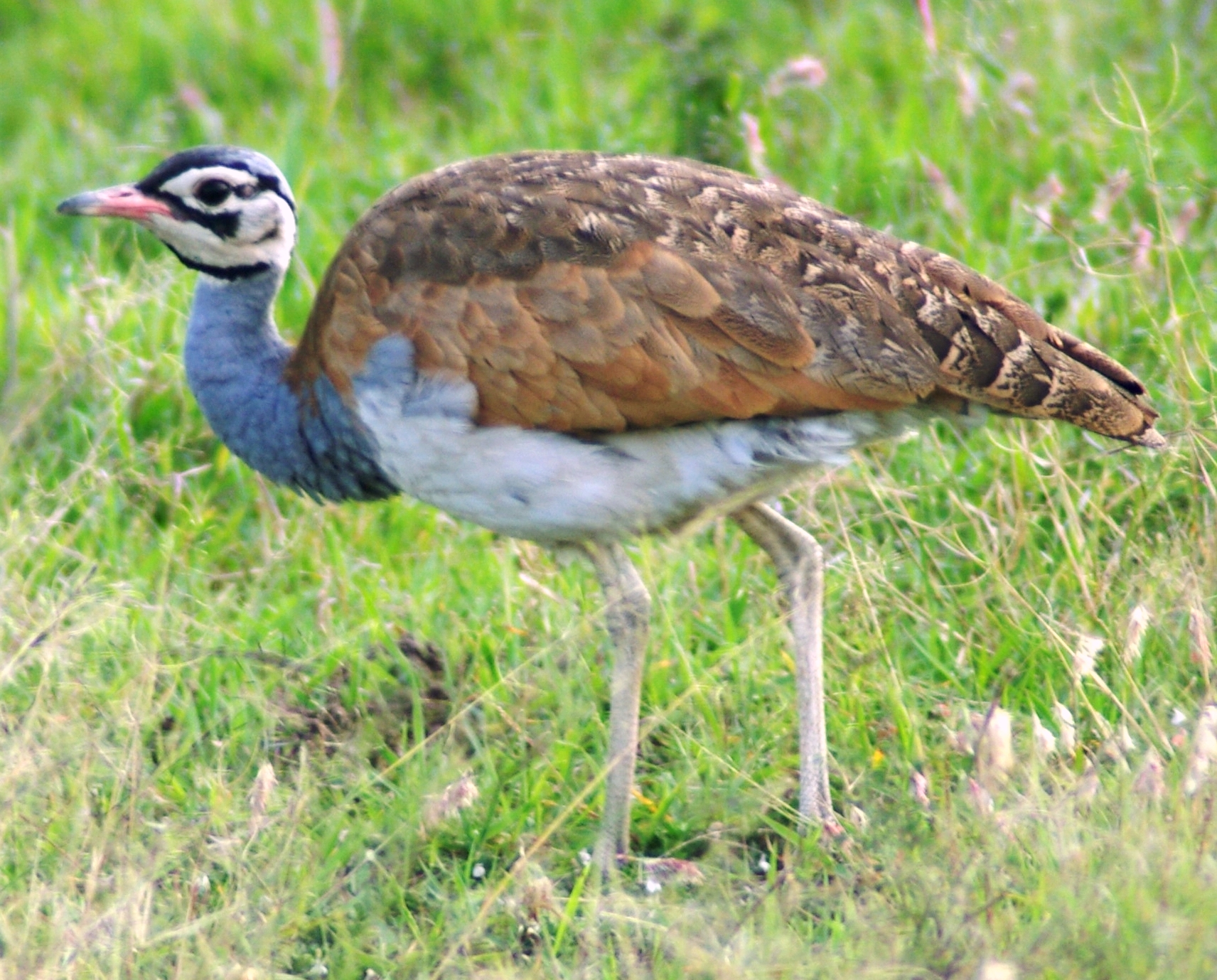
E. s. canicollis, male, Sweetwaters Game Reserve, Kenya

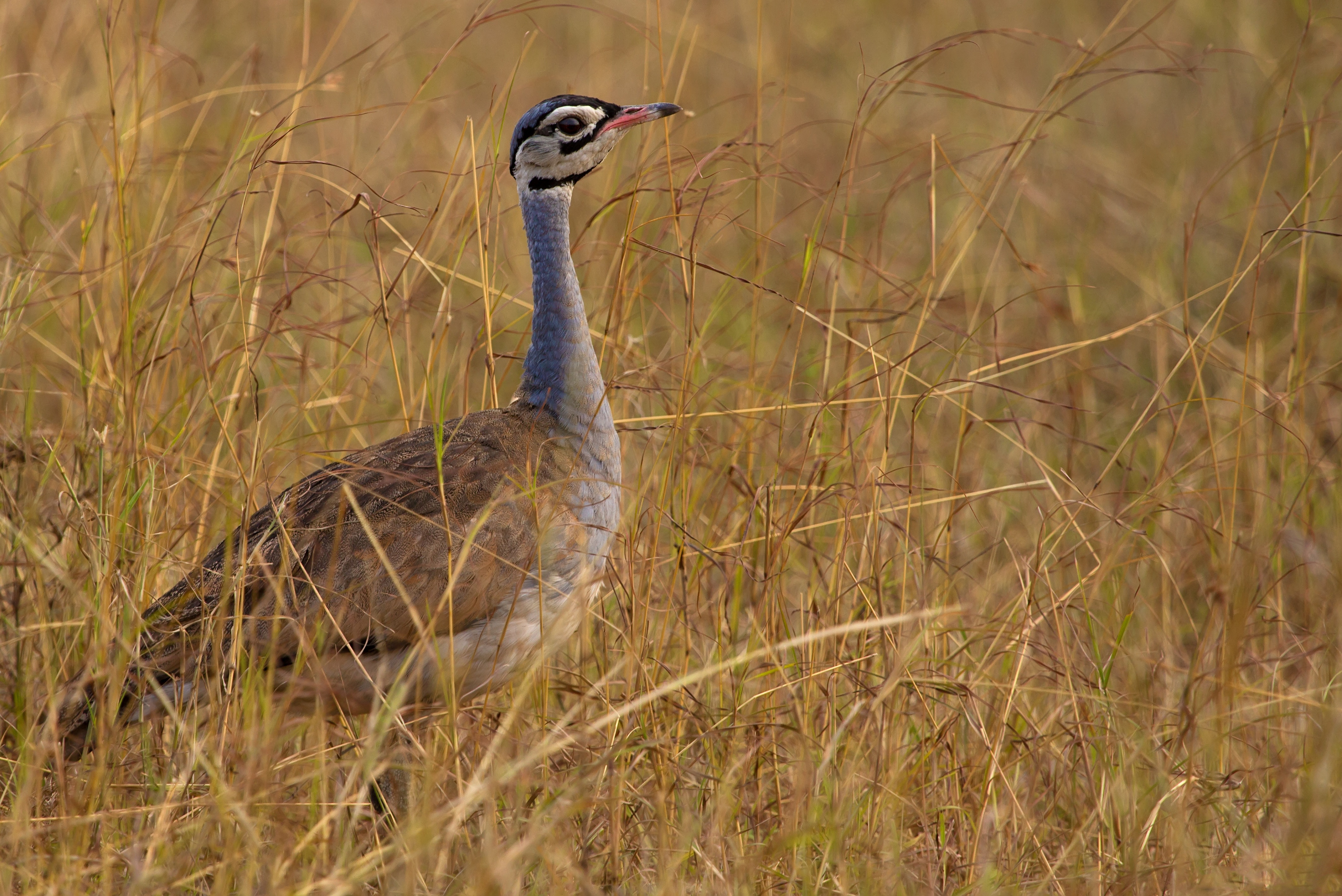
Male from Maasai Mara, Kenya

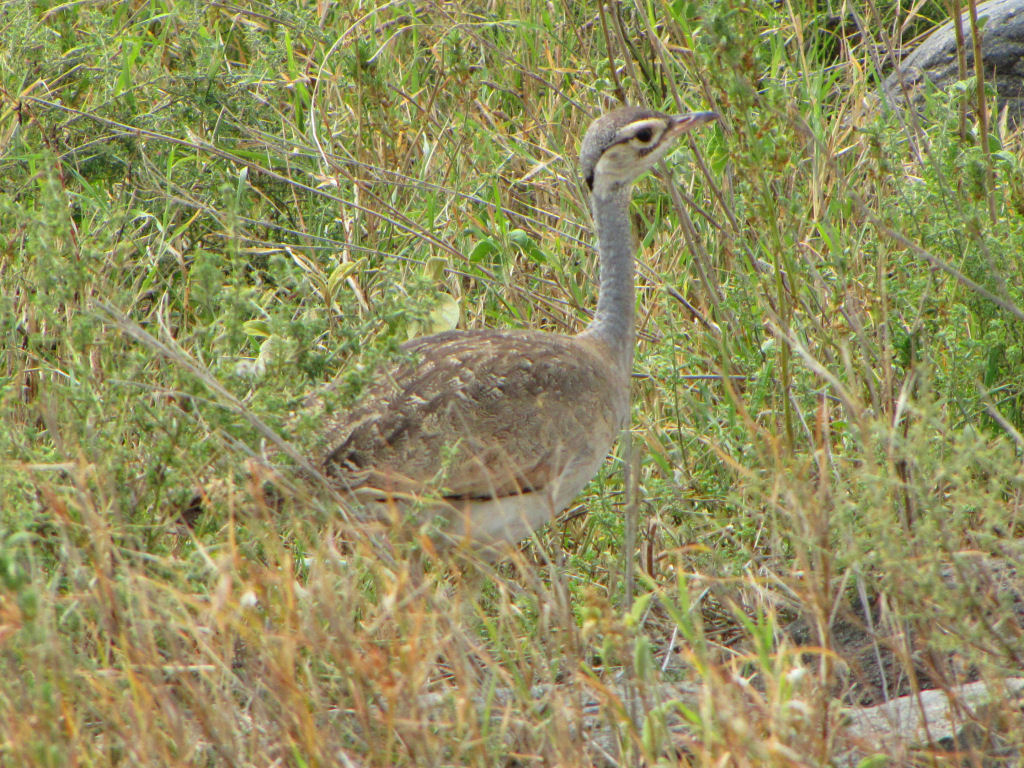
E. s. erlangeri, female, Serengeti, Tanzania

It is one of the smaller bustards, 48 to 61 centimetres (19 to 24 in) long. All are tawny brown above and on the breast and white on the belly, with cream-coloured legs; juveniles have light brown necks and heads, and adults have blue-grey necks. The adult female has a grey crown, a brown and buff line below the eye, and black speckling on the throat. The adult male has a black crown, black lines on the white cheeks, a black throat patch, and a pinkish-red bill. This species exhibits sexual dimorphism; the males are larger than the females. The call, often given in the early morning and late evening, has been described as "a very loud, guttural k'whuka WHUKa, k'wuka WHUKa..., or k'warrak, k'warrak..."

This species is usually seen in pairs or family groups, as young stay with their parents much longer than those of other bustards in the region.

== Taxonomy ==
White-bellied bustards are one of the 26 recognized species of bustards in the family Otididae (bustards, floricans, korhaans). The species was first named Eupodotis caffra, but was later renamed Eupodotis senegalensis. They are most closely related to the Blue bustard (Eupodotis caerulescens, sometimes called blue korhaan). Although taxonomists have sometimes included other bustard species in Eupodotis, the white-bellied and blue bustard are currently recognized as the only two species of this genus.

== Subspecies ==
The species is subdivided into subspecies based on distribution and visual differences. The color of the feathers, beak, and legs can be different, as well as the breeding and foraging areas.

Five subspecies are recognized:

- E. s. senegalensis (Vieillot, 1820) – southwestern Mauritania and Guinea, east to Central African Republic, central Sudan, and perhaps Eritrea (Senegal bustard)
- E. s. canicollis (Reichenow, 1881) – Ethiopia south to northeastern Tanzania
- E. s. erlangeri (Reichenow, 1905) – southern Kenya and western Tanzania
- E. s. mackenziei C.M.N. White, 1945 – eastern Gabon and central Democratic Republic of the Congo to Zambia, Angola and northern Namibia
- E. s. barrowii (J.E. Gray, 1829) – Botswana, Eswatini, South Africa, and Lesotho

This last subspecies is sometimes referred to as its own species (E. barrowii, Barrow's bustard, or Barrow's korhaan), but there have not been enough studies done on the population to confirm its status.

== Habitat and distribution ==
White-bellied bustards are found exclusively on the African continent. Apart from smaller isolated groups, their large range is generally separated in four zones with distinct populations:

- Southeastern Botswana to Eastern South Africa and Eswatini (E. s. barrowii subspecies)
- Southeastern Gabon down to Angola and Western Zambia (E. s. mackenziei subspecies)
- Northern Ethiopia and Somalia, Northeast Uganda, Across Western Kenya and Tanzania ( E. s. canicollis and E. s. erlangeri subspecies)
- Across West Africa, from Senegal and Gambia, South to Côte d'Ivoire, and East to Central and Southern Sudan (E. s. senegalensis subspecies)

=== Habitat ===
White-bellied bustards enjoy mostly tall grasslands and savannah. They prefer open areas or bushland with dwarf trees. The West African population is better adapted to more arid weather conditions, and sometimes ventures into the desert during the rainy season. Other populations stick to greener areas of dense tall grass and can also be seen in river plains or cultivated areas. Individuals have been recorded at high elevation (up to 2,000 meters (6,600 ft) above sea level) in certain parts of Eastern Africa, but most sightings are at 1,500 meters (4,900 ft) elevations or less, depending on the weather patterns of each region.

=== Home range ===
Home ranges or territories for breeding pairs or groups of white-bellied bustards are estimated to be around 40 ha but in certain areas groups were observed to stay 100 ha from each other, potentially indicating a bigger territory.

== Behavior ==
=== Vocalizations ===
The white-bellied bustard's calls can be heard year-round, mostly at dusk or dawn or during rainfall. Both males and females vocalize. The most recognizable of its sounds is a croaking call (a guttural "kuk-kur-ruk" or "kuk-kaaah"), which is used in territorial defense among other purposes. This very loud sound can be heard form a distance and often triggers responses from other bustard groups far away.

=== Diet ===
White-belied bustards are considered omnivores, as most other species of bustards. They usually eat small invertebrates (mainly beetles, but also termites, locusts, caterpillars, spiders) and plants (seeds, bulbs, berries, flowers). These birds forage by moving low to the ground to find food, sometimes in recently burnt areas.

=== Reproduction ===
==== Breeding ====
Most aspects of this species' breeding and mate selection are currently unknown. The time of year at which they breed varies greatly depending on the region and subspecies; from March to June in Northeast Africa to October to February in South Africa. Nests are usually a simple unlined scrape in the ground and situated in or under vegetation so that the eggs, chicks, and female can be hidden from predators. This way, the female can leave the nest and escape to safety without drawing attention to its eggs if she is in danger.

==== Eggs ====
The white-bellied bustard's eggs are pale to dark olive-colored with darker brown or gray markings. They are usually laid in clutches of one to three. The eggs are incubated by the female. The incubation period is about 23 days in captivity, but has not been studied in the wild.

== Status and conservation ==
The species is listed as least concern on the International Union for Conservation of Nature's Red List due to their large range. In South Africa, white-bellied bustards populations have been classified as vulnerable by the SANBI in 2015 due to local population decline. Human-induced land use change through agriculture, overgrazing, grass burning, and urbanisation are thought to be the main causes of this decline.

=== Captive breeding ===
In certain countries, white-bellied bustard chicks have been successfully raised until adulthood in captivity (mostly during the 1990's). There are specific guidelines to be respected by zoos and scientific facilities in these cases. The blood composition, bone structure, and internal organ structure of Wwhite-bellied bustards has been studied at different life stages to improve care for injured or sick individuals in captivity.
