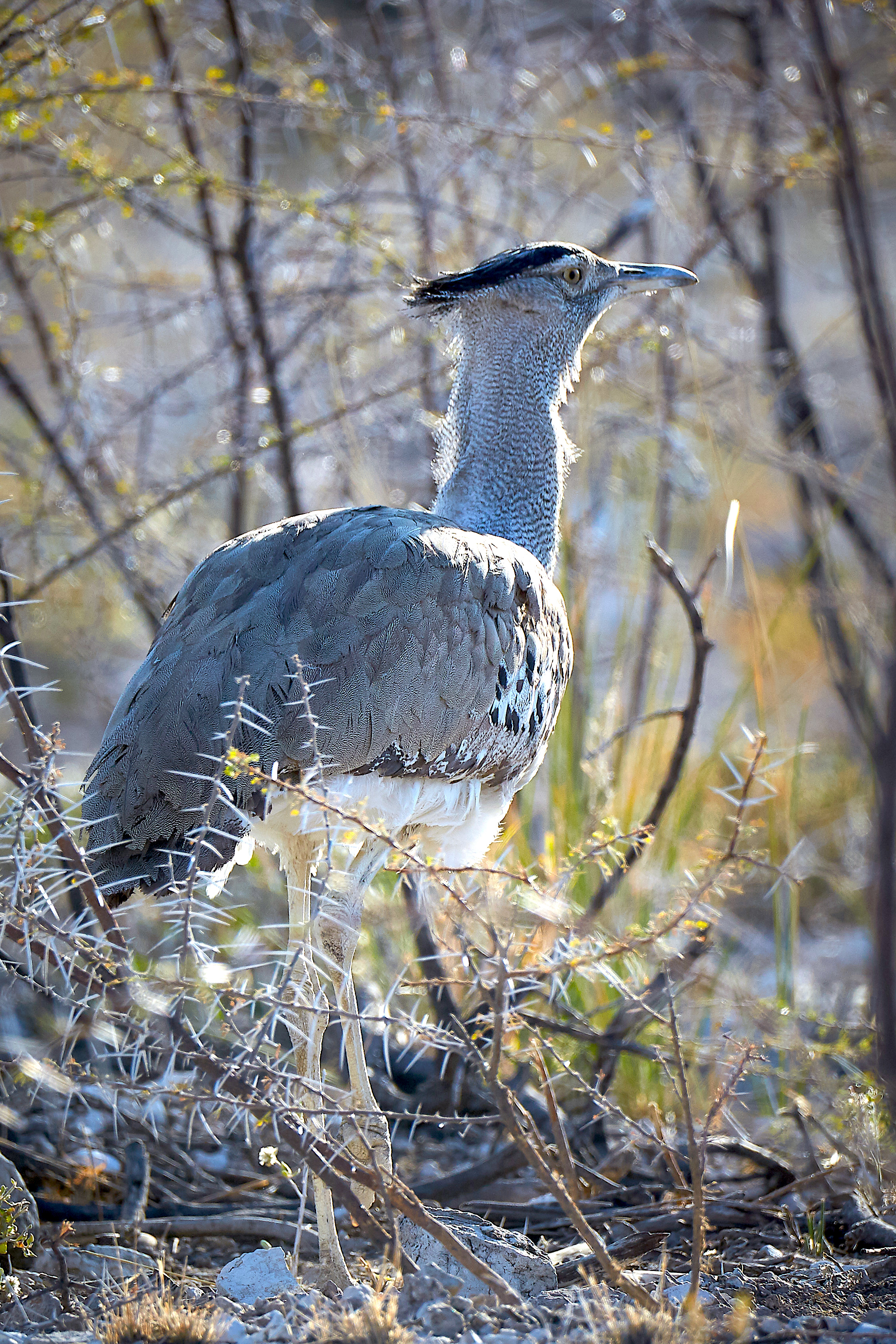
- Kori bustard in Etosha National Park, Namibia

Scientific classification
- Kingdom: Animalia
- Phylum: Chordata
- Class: Aves
- Clade: Otidimorphae
- Order: Otidiformes; Wagler, 1830
- Family: Otididae; Rafinesque, 1815

Genera
- Lissotis; Ardeotis; Neotis; Tetrax; Otis; Chlamydotis; Houbaropsis; Sypheotides; Lophotis; Eupodotis; Afrotis

Synonyms
- Gryzajidae Brodkorb 1967

= Bustard =

Bustards Temporal range: Miocene–Holocene, 13–0 Ma

Family of birds

Bustards, including floricans and korhaans, are large, terrestrial birds living mainly in dry grassland areas and in steppe regions. They range in length from 40 to 150 cm (16 to 59 in). They make up the family Otididae (/oʊˈtɪdɪdiː/, formerly known as Otidae).

Bustards are omnivorous and opportunistic, eating leaves, buds, seeds, fruit, small vertebrates, and invertebrates. There are 26 species currently recognised.

== Etymology ==
The word bustard comes from the Old French bistarda and some other languages: abetarda (Portuguese), abetarda (Galician), avutarda (Spanish) used for the great bustard. The naturalist William Turner listed the English spelling "bustard" and "bistard" in 1544.

All of the common names above are derived from Latin avis tarda or aves tardas given by Pliny the Elder, (Note: "proximae iis sunt quas Hispania aves tardas appellat, Graecia ωτιδος damnatas in cibis; emissa enim ossibus medulla odoris taedium extemplo sequitur." [Next to these are the birds that Spain calls tardae and Greece otides, which are condemned as an article of diet, because when the marrow is drained out of their bones a disgusting smell at once follows.]) these names were mentioned by the Pierre Belon in 1555 and Ulisse Aldrovandi in 1600. The word tarda comes from tardus in Latin meaning "slow" and "deliberate", which is apt to describe the typical walking style of the species.

=== Floricans ===
Some Indian bustards are also called floricans. The origin of the name is unclear. Thomas C. Jerdon writes in The Birds of India (1862):

I have not been able to trace the origin of the Anglo-Indian word Florikin, but was once informed that the Little Bustard in Europe was sometimes called Flanderkin. Latham gives the word Flercher as an English name, and this, apparently, has the same origin as Florikin.

— Jerdon's Birds of India, 2nd ed. ii. 625.

The Hobson-Jobson dictionary, however, casts doubt on this theory stating that

We doubt if Jerdon has here understood Latham correctly. What Latham writes is, in describing the Passarage Bustard, which, he says, is the size of the Little Bustard: Inhabits India. Called Passarage Plover. ... I find that it is known in India by the name of Oorail; by some of the English called Flercher. (Suppt. to Gen. Synopsis of Birds, 1787, 229). Here we understand the English to be the English in India, and Flercher to be a clerical error for some form of floriken.

== Taxonomy ==
The family Otididae was introduced (as Otidia) by the French polymath Constantine Samuel Rafinesque in 1815. Otididae and before that Otidae come from the genus Otis given to the great bustard by the Swedish naturalist Carl Linnaeus in the tenth edition of his Systema Naturae in 1758, it comes from the Greek word ὠτίς ōtis.

Phylogeny of Otididae

- - Lissotis
    - L. hartlaubii (Hartlaub's bustard)
    - L. melanogaster (black-bellied bustard)
  - - Ardeotis
      - A. nuba (Nubian bustard)
      - - A. ludwigii (Ludwig's bustard)
        - A. denhami (Denham's bustard)
        - - A. heuglinii (Heuglin's bustard)
          - - A. arabs (Arabian bustard)
            - - A. kori (Kori bustard)
              - - A. nigriceps (Great Indian bustard)
                - A. australis (Australian bustard)
    - - - Tetrax tetrax (little bustard)
        - - Otis tarda (great bustard)
          - Chlamydotis
            - C. macqueenii (MacQueen's bustard)
            - C. undulata (houbara bustard)
      - - - - Sypheotides indicus (lesser florican)
            - Houbaropsis bengalensis (Bengal florican)
          - Lophotis
            - L. ruficrista (red-crested bustard)
            - - L. savilei (Savile's bustard)
              - L. gindiana (buff-crested bustard)
        - - Heterotetrax
            - H. humilis (little brown bustard)
            - - H. rueppelii (Rüppell's korhaan)
              - H. vigorsii (karoo korhaan)
          - - Afrotis
              - A. afra (southern black korhaan)
              - A. afraoides (northern black korhaan)
            - Eupodotis
              - E. senegalensis (white-bellied bustard)
              - E. caerulescens (blue korhaan)

Family Otididae
Image	Genus	Living species
	Lissotis Reichenbach 1848	Hartlaub's bustard, Lissotis hartlaubii (Heuglin 1863); Black-bellied bustard, Lissotis melanogaster (Rüppell 1835); L. m. notophila Oberholser 1905; L. m. melanogaster (Rüppell 1835)
	Neotis Sharpe 1893	Denham's bustard, Neotis denhami (Children & Vigors, 1826); N. d. denhami (Denham's bustard) (Children & Vigors, 1826); N. d. jacksoni (Jackson's bustard) Bannerman, 1930; N. d. stanleyi (Stanley bustard) (Gray, 1831); Heuglin's bustard, Neotis heuglinii (Hartlaub, 1859); Ludwig's bustard, Neotis ludwigii (Rüppell, 1837); Nubian bustard, Neotis nuba (Cretzschmar, 1826)
	Ardeotis Le Maout 1853	Arabian bustard, Ardeotis arabs (Linnaeus 1758); A. a. lynesi (Bannerman 1930) (Moroccan bustard); A. a. stieberi (Neumann 1907) (great Arabian bustard); A. a. arabs (Linnaeus 1758); A. a. butleri (Bannerman 1930) (Sudan bustard); Australian bustard, Ardeotis australis (Gray 1829); Great Indian bustard, Ardeotis nigriceps (Vigors 1831); Kori bustard, Ardeotis kori (Burchell 1822); A. k. struthiunculus (Neumann 1907) (northern Kori bustard); A. k. kori (Burchell 1822) (southern Kori bustard)
	Tetrax Forster 1817	†T. paratetrax (Bocheński & Kuročkin 1987); Little bustard, Tetrax tetrax (Linnaeus 1758) Forster 1817
	Otis Linnaeus 1758	†O. bessarabicus Kessler & Gal 1996; †O. hellenica Boev, Lazaridis & Tsoukala 2014; Great bustard, Otis tarda Linnaeus 1758; O. t. tarda Linnaeus 1758 (western great bustard); O. t. dybowskii Taczanowski 1874 (eastern great bustard)
	Chlamydotis Lesson 1839	†C. affinis (Lydekker 1891a) Brodkorb 1967; †C. mesetaria Sánchez Marco 1990; MacQueen's bustard, Chlamydotis macqueenii (Gray 1832); Houbara bustard, Chlamydotis undulata (Jacquin 1784); C. u. fuertaventurae (Rothschild & Hartert 1894) (Canary Islands houbara bustard); C. u. undulata (Jacquin 1784) (North African houbara bustard)
	Houbaropsis Sharpe 1893	Bengal florican, Houbaropsis bengalensis (Statius Müller 1776) Sharpe 1893; H. b. bengalensis (Statius Müller 1776) Sharpe 1893; H. b. blandini Delacour 1928
	Sypheotides Lesson 1839	Lesser florican, Sypheotides indicus (Miller 1782) Lesson 1839
	Lophotis Reichenbach 1848	Red-crested korhaan, Lophotis ruficrista (Smith 1836); Savile's bustard, Lophotis savilei Lynes 1920; Buff-crested bustard, Lophotis gindiana (Oustalet 1881)
	Heterotetrax Sharpe 1894	Little brown bustard, Heterotetrax humilis (Blyth 1855); Karoo korhaan, Heterotetrax vigorsii (Smith 1831); H. v. namaqua (Roberts 1932); H. v. vigorsii (Smith 1831); Rüppell's korhaan, Heterotetrax rueppelii (Wahlberg 1856); H. r. fitzsimonsi (Roberts 1937); H. r. rueppelii (Wahlberg 1856)
	Eupodotis Lesson 1839	Blue korhaan, Eupodotis caerulescens (Vieillot 1820); White-bellied bustard, Eupodotis senegalensis (Vieillot 1821); E. s. barrowii (Gray 1829) (Barrow's/southern white-bellied bustard); E. s. canicollis (Reichenow 1881) (Somali white-bellied knorhaan); E. s. erlangeri (Reichenow 1905); E. s. mackenziei White 1945; E. s. senegalensis (Vieillot 1821) (Senegal bustard)
	Afrotis Gray 1855	Southern black korhaan, Afrotis afra (Linnaeus 1758); Northern black korhaan, Afrotis afraoides (Smith 1831); A. a. etoschae (Grote 1922); A. a. damarensis Roberts 1926; A. a. afraoides (Smith 1831)

Extinct genera

- Genus †Gryzaja Zubareva 1939
  - †Gryzaja odessana Zubareva 1939
- Genus †Ioriotis Burchak-Abramovich & Vekua 1981
  - †Ioriotis gabunii Burchak-Abramovich & Vekua 1981
- Genus †Miootis Umanskaya 1979
  - †Miootis compactus Umanskaya 1979
- Genus †Pleotis Hou 1982
  - †Pleotis liui Hou 1982

== Description ==
Bustards are all fairly large with the two largest species, the kori bustard (Ardeotis kori) and the great bustard (Otis tarda), being frequently cited as the world's heaviest flying birds. In both the largest species, large males exceed a weight of 20 kg (44 lb), weigh around 13.5 kg (30 lb) on average and can attain a total length of 150 cm (59 in). The smallest species is the little brown bustard (Eupodotis humilis), which is around 40 cm (16 in) long and weighs around 600 g (1.3 lb) on average. In most bustards, males are substantially larger than females, often about 30% longer and sometimes more than twice the weight. They are among the most sexually dimorphic groups of birds. In only the floricans is the sexual dimorphism the reverse, with the adult female being slightly larger and heavier than the male.

The wings have 10 primaries and 16–24 secondary feathers. There are 18–20 feathers in the tail. The plumage is predominantly cryptic.

== Behaviour and ecology ==
Bustards are omnivorous, feeding principally on seeds and invertebrates. They make their nests on the ground, making their eggs and offspring often very vulnerable to predation. They walk steadily on strong legs and big toes, pecking for food as they go. Most prefer to run or walk over flying. They have long broad wings with "fingered" wingtips, and striking patterns in flight. Many have interesting mating displays, such as inflating throat sacs or elevating elaborate feathered crests. The female lays three to five dark, speckled eggs in a scrape in the ground, and incubates them alone.

== Evolution ==
Genetic dating indicates that bustards evolved c. 30 million years ago in either southern or eastern Africa from where they dispersed into Eurasia and Australia.

== Status and conservation ==
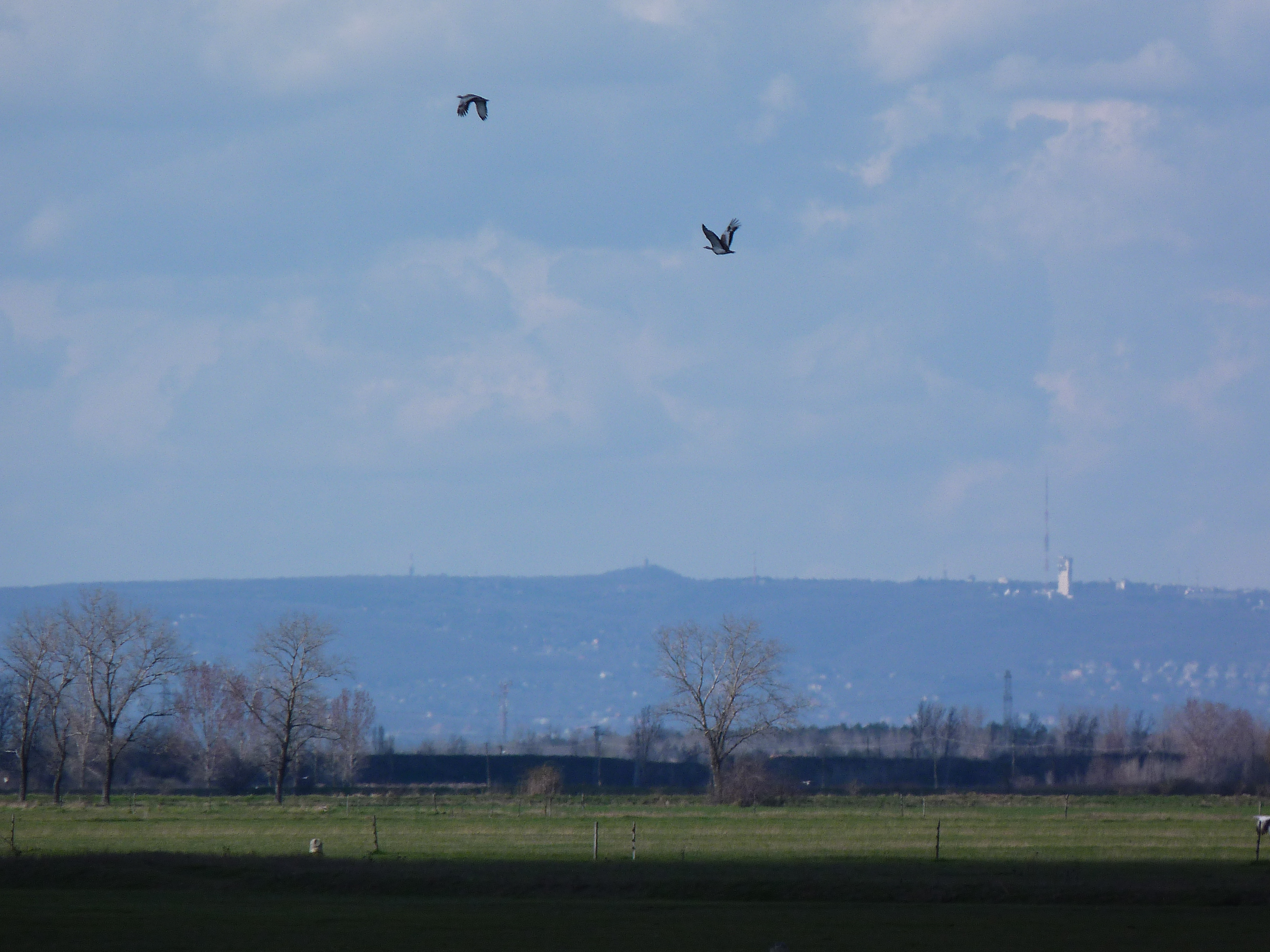
Flying bustards – Apajpuszta, Hungary

Bustards are gregarious outside the breeding season, but are very wary and difficult to approach in the open habitats they prefer. Most species are declining or endangered through habitat loss and hunting, even where they are nominally protected.

=== United Kingdom ===
The birds were once common and abounded on the Salisbury Plain. They had become rare by 1819 when a large male, surprised by a dog on Newmarket Heath, sold in Leadenhall Market for five guineas. The last bustard in Britain died in approximately 1832, but the bird is being reintroduced through batches of chicks imported from Russia. In 2009, two great bustard chicks were hatched in Britain for the first time in more than 170 years. Reintroduced bustards also hatched chicks in 2010.

== Bibliography ==
- Bota, Gerard, et al. Ecology and Conservation of Steppe-Land Birds. International Symposium on Ecology and Conservation of Steppe-land birds. Lynx Edicions 2005. 343 pages. ISBN 84-87334-99-7.
- Chisholm, Hugh, ed. (1911). "Bustard" . Encyclopædia Britannica (11th ed.). Cambridge University Press.
- Hackett, SJ; et al. (2008). "A phylogenomic study of birds reveals their evolutionary history". Science. 320 (5884): 1763–1768. Bibcode:2008Sci...320.1763H. doi:10.1126/science.1157704. PMID 18583609. S2CID 6472805.
- Jarvis, Erich D; et al. (2014). "Whole-genome analyses resolve early branches in the tree of life of modern birds". Science. 346 (6215): 1320–1331. Bibcode:2014Sci...346.1320J. doi:10.1126/science.1253451. PMC 4405904. PMID 25504713.
- Knox, Alan G.; Martin Collinson; Andreas J. Helbig; David T. Parkin; George Sangster (October 2002). "Taxonomic recommendations for British birds". Ibis. 144 (4): 707–710. doi:10.1046/j.1474-919X.2002.00110.x.
- Sibley, Charles G.; Jon E. Ahlquist (1990). Phylogeny and Classification of the Birds: A Study in Molecular Evolution. New Haven: Yale University Press. ISBN 978-0-300-04085-2.
