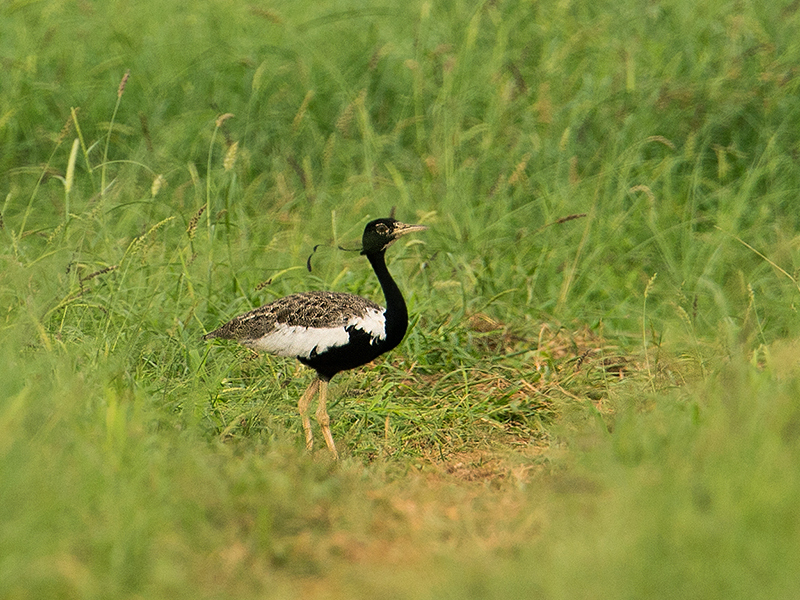
- Male

Conservation status
- Critically Endangered (IUCN 3.1)
- CITES Appendix II

Scientific classification
- Kingdom: Animalia
- Phylum: Chordata
- Class: Aves
- Order: Otidiformes
- Family: Otididae
- Genus: Sypheotides; Lesson, 1839
- Species: S. indicus

Binomial name
- Sypheotides indicus (Miller, JF, 1782)
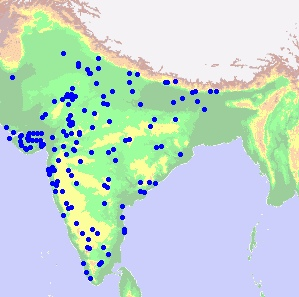
- Spot distribution map (includes historic records)
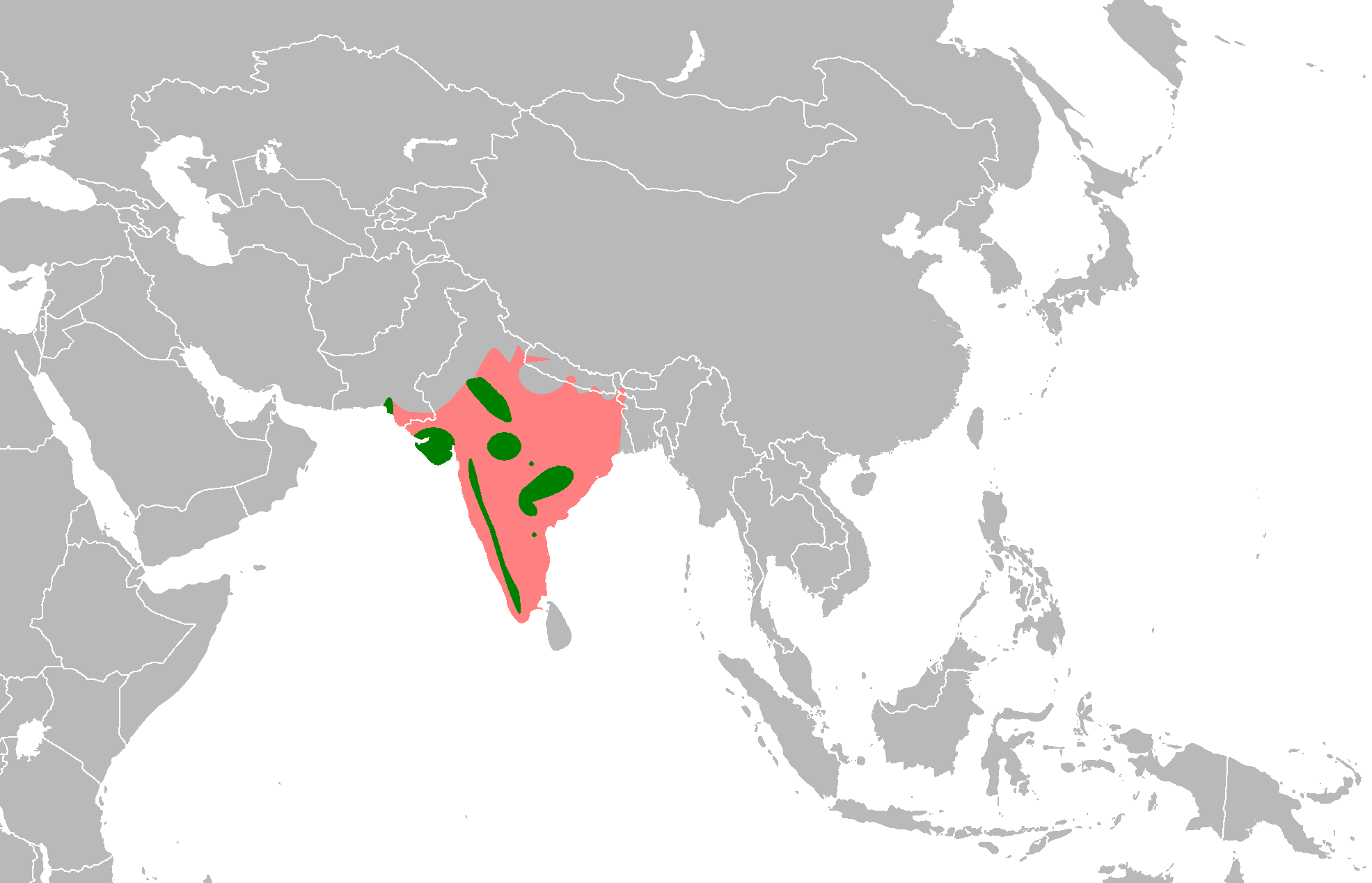
- Overall distribution (reddish) and breeding areas (green)

Synonyms
- Sypheotis aurita

= Lesser florican =

Species of bird

The lesser florican (Sypheotides indicus), also known as the likh or kharmore, is the smallest in the bustard family and the only member of the genus Sypheotides. It is endemic to the Indian Subcontinent where it is found in tall grasslands and is best known for the leaping breeding displays made by the males during the monsoon season. The male has a contrasting black and white breeding plumage and distinctive elongated head feathers that extend behind the neck. These bustards are found mainly in northwestern and central India during the summer but are found more widely distributed across India in winter. The species is highly endangered and has been extirpated in some parts of its range such as Pakistan. It is threatened both by hunting and habitat degradation. The only similar species is the Bengal florican (Houbarobsis bengalensis) which is larger and lacks the white throat, collar and elongated plumes.

== Taxonomy and systematics ==
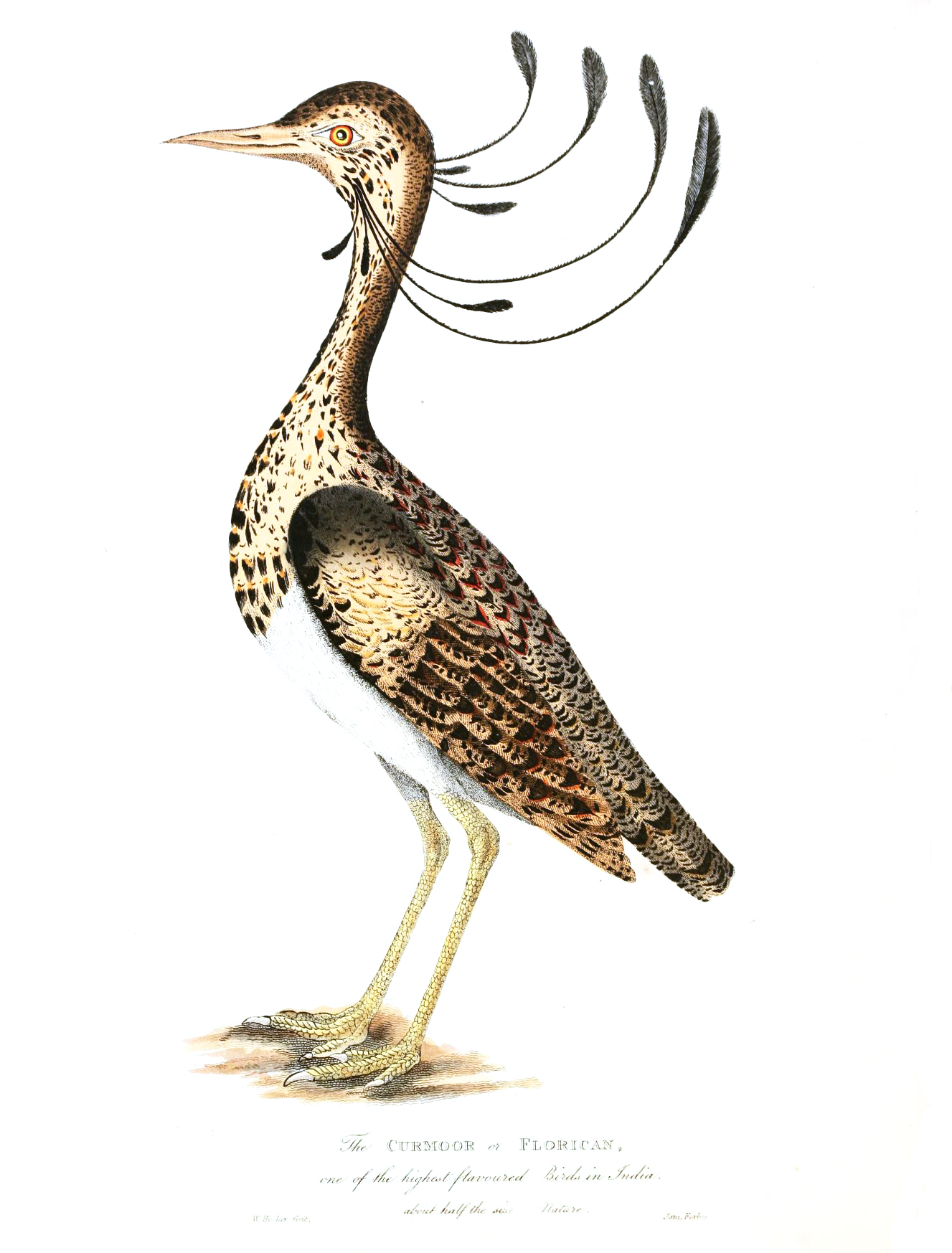
Plate from James Forbes' Oriental Memoirs (1813). He noted that "The florican or Curmoor exceeds all the Indian wild-fowl in delicacy of flavour".

In 1782 the English illustrator John Frederick Miller included a hand-coloured plate of a female lesser florican in his Icones animalium et plantarum. He coined the binomial name Otis indica. It is now the only species placed in the genus Sypheotides that was introduced in 1839 by the French naturalist René Lesson. The species is monotypic: no subspecies are recognised.

The two species of smaller bustards have been called "floricans". The word has been thought to be of Dutch origin. The genus Sypheotides earlier included what is now Houbaropsis bengalensis (or Bengal florican), the two species being small and showing reverse sexual size dimorphism. The tarsus is long in Sypheotides and the seasonal plumage change in male has led to the retention of the separate genus, although the two genera are evolutionarily close. Male and female plumages were initially thought of as separate species leading to the names aurita and indica and the species has been placed in the past in the genera Otis, Eupodotis and Sypheotis. The species ending which is related to the gender of the Latin genus has been debated and it believed that indicus is correct.

The horizontal body carriage, size and habit of holding up their tail feathers when walking on the ground have led their local names to make associations with peacocks, with a popular name being the equivalent of "grass peacock" (such as khar-mor, tan-mor) in some areas. the name Likh is used in northwestern India and adopted by British sportsmen in India.

== Description ==
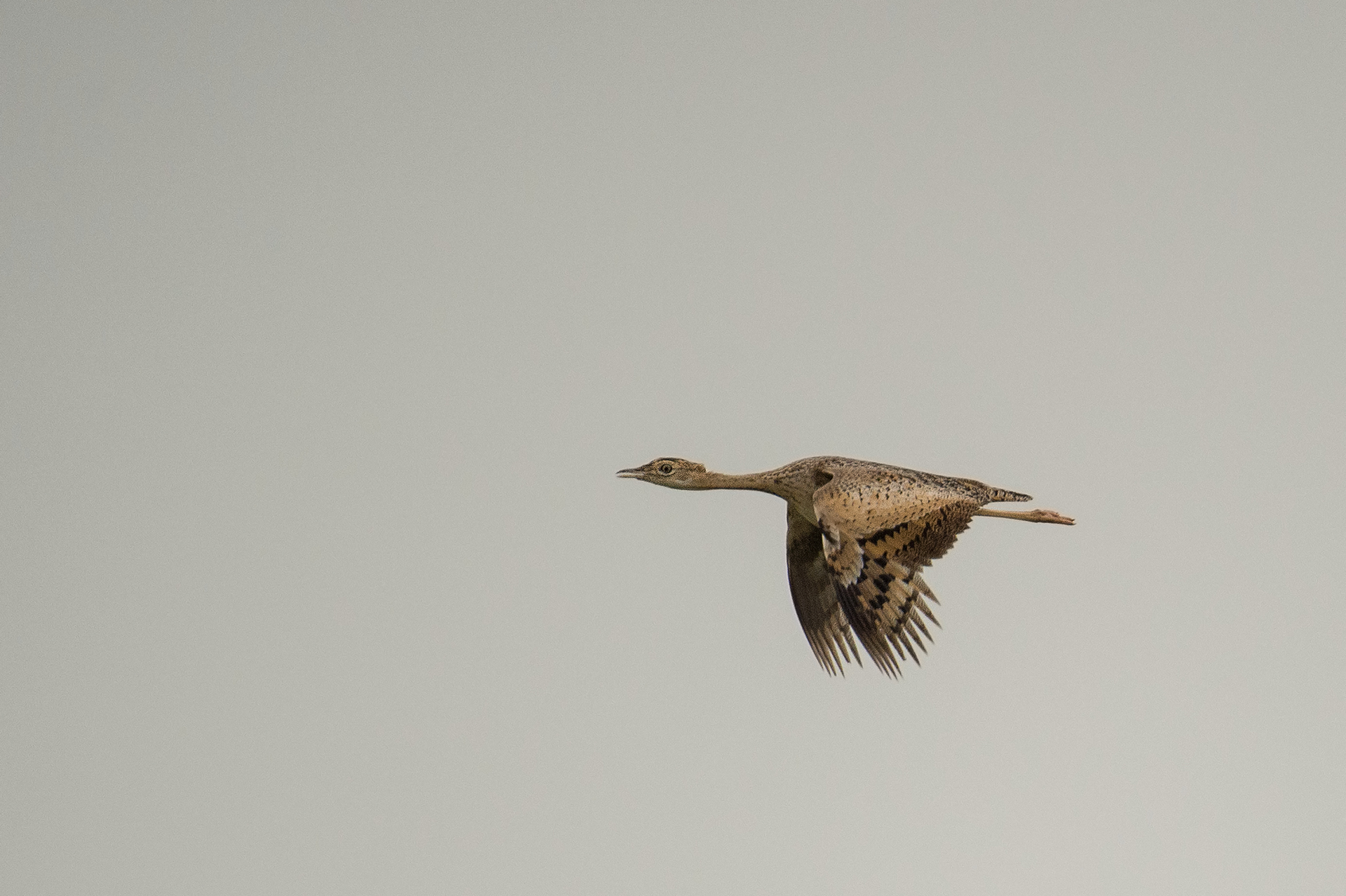
Female in flight

A male in breeding plumage has a black head, neck and lower parts. However, his throat is white. Around three 4-inch (10 cm) long, ribbon-like feathers arise from behind the ear-coverts on each side of the head and extend backwards, curving up and ending in spatulate tip. The back and scapulars are mottled in white with V-shaped marks. The wing coverts are white. After the breedings season, the male tends to have some white in the wing. The female is slightly larger than the male. The females and males in non-breeding plumage are buff with black streaks with darker markings on the head and neck. The back is mottled and barred in black. The neck and upper breast are buff with the streaks decreasing towards the belly. The outer primaries of the males are thin and notched on the inner-web. The leg are pale yellow and the iris is yellow.

Young birds have a distinct U-shaped mark on the neck near the throat.

== Distribution and habitat ==
The species was formerly more widespread across much of Indian Sub-continent, but not in Sri Lanka. It breeds mainly in the central and western parts of India. Historic records exist from the Makran coast of Balochistan province in Pakistan. A record from Burma has been questioned. The species is said to move in response to rainfall and their presence at locations can be erratic, with sudden large numbers in some seasons. About 500 males in Gujarat were ringed and nearly 18 were recovered, most of them within about 50 kilometres (31 mi) of their ringing sites. The preferred habitat is grasslands but it sometimes occurs in fields such as those of cotton and lentils. Breeding areas are today restricted mainly to Rajasthan, Gujarat, Madhya Pradesh, some areas in southern Nepal and parts of Andhra Pradesh. Managing florican habitats as grassland interspersed with croplands and pastures spared rotationally provided optimal results at low production-level.

== Behaviour and ecology ==
These bustards are found either singly or in pairs in thick grassland or sometimes in crop fields. Indigenous tribal hunters regularly shot the males during the breeding season, as they were easy to spot because of their courtship display. It was said to be good for eating but considered inferior to the meat of the Bengal florican. They fly faster than other bustards and give a duck-like impression in flight.

=== Food and feeding ===
Lesser floricans feed on a wide variety of small vertebrates and invertebrates which include worms, centipedes, lizards, frogs and insects such as locusts, flying ants and hairy caterpillars. They are also known to feed on shoots and seeds, herbs and berries.

Usually floricans feed during the early hours of mornings or in the evenings, except in the case of newly migrated birds which feed throughout the day.

=== Breeding ===
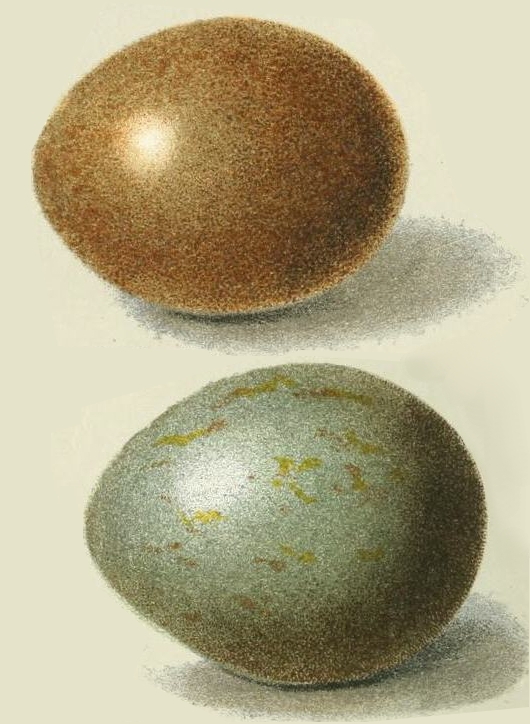
Eggs showing the colour variation

The breeding season varies with the onset of the Southwest Monsoon and is September to October in northern India and April to May in parts of southern India.

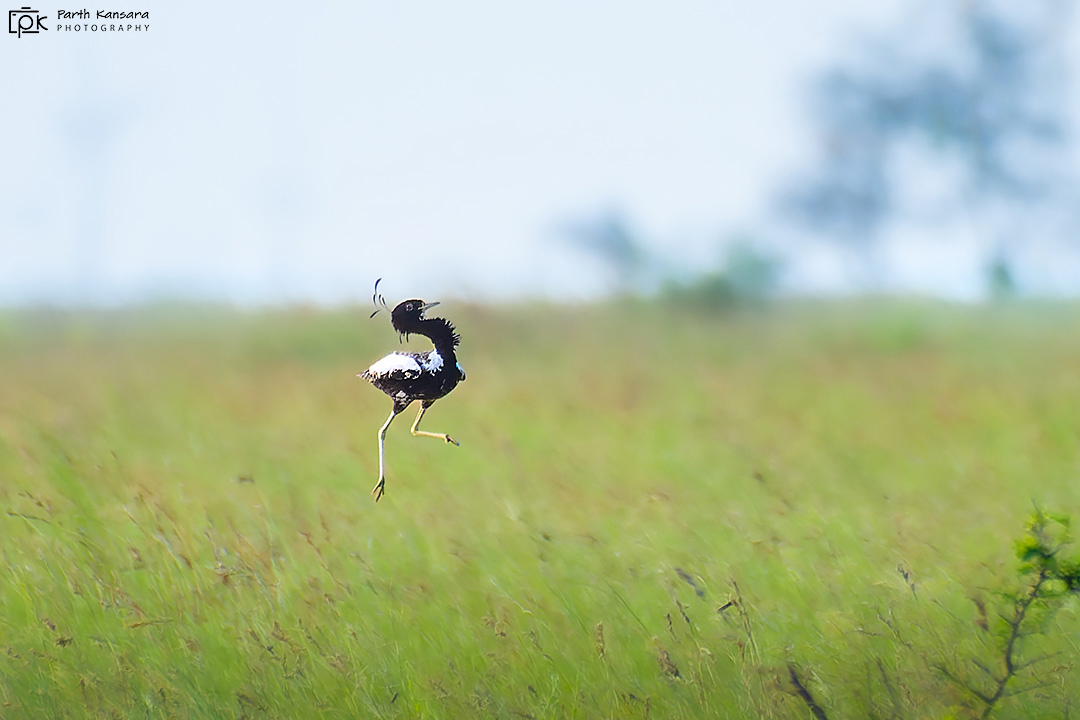
A male leaping from the grass during breeding season

During the breeding season, males leap suddenly from the grass with a peculiar croaking or knocking call, flutter their wings and fall back with slightly open wings. At the apogee of the leap the neck is arched backwards and the legs folded as if in a sitting posture. These jumps are repeated after intervals of about three or more minutes. The displays are made mainly in the early mornings and late evenings, but during other parts of the day in cloudy weather.

The breeding system is said to be a dispersed lek with each male holding a territory of about 1–2 hectares. Males are said to favour particular display sites and shooting of these displaying birds has led to sharp declines in the populations in the past. Lek sites tend to have flat ground with low vegetation and good visibility and well used sites usually show signs of trampling.

Females have a defensive display at nest which involves spreading their wings, tail and neck feathers. The females are said to produce a whistling call which attracts males. Males are aggressive towards other males in the neighbourhood. The nest is a shallow scrape on the ground and 3-4 (1.88 x 1.6 inches) eggs are laid. The nest location is usually in dense grass. Females take sole part in incubation and rearing the chicks. The incubation period is about 21 days.
