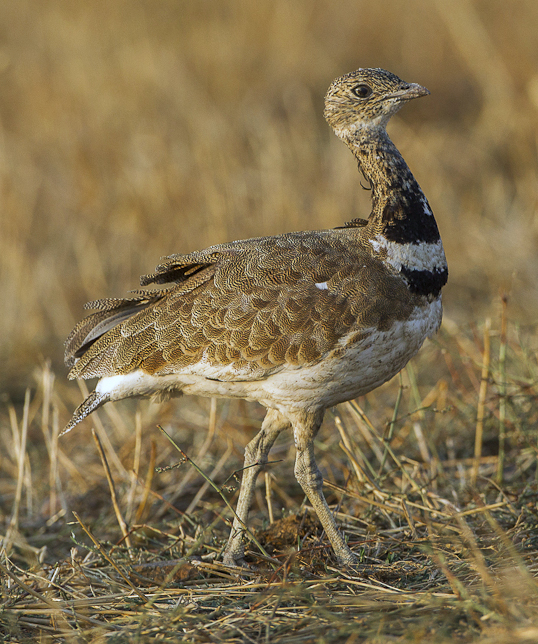
- Male
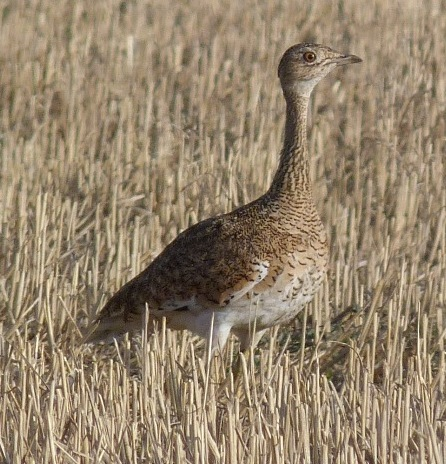
- Female

Conservation status
- Near Threatened (IUCN 3.1)
- CITES Appendix II

Scientific classification
- Kingdom: Animalia
- Phylum: Chordata
- Class: Aves
- Order: Otidiformes
- Family: Otididae
- Genus: Tetrax; T. Forster, 1817
- Species: T. tetrax

Binomial name
- Tetrax tetrax (Linnaeus, 1758)
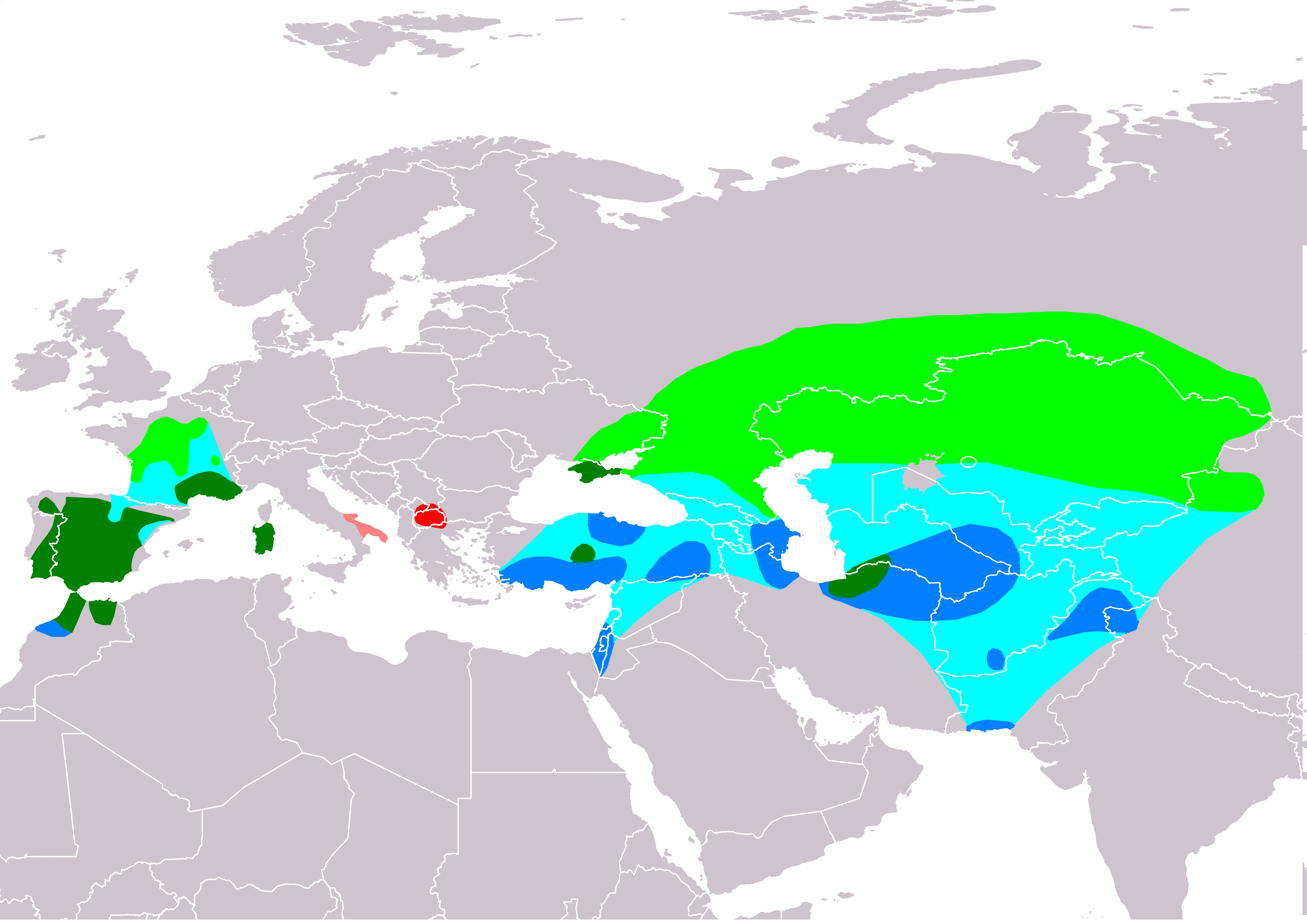
- Range of T. tetrax Breeding Resident Non-breeding Passage Probably extinct Extinct

Synonyms
- Otis tetrax Linnaeus, 1758 (protonym)

= Little bustard =

Species of bird

The little bustard (Tetrax tetrax) is a bird in the bustard family, the only member of the genus Tetrax. It breeds in Southern Europe and in Western and Central Asia.

== Taxonomy ==
The little bustard was formally described in 1758 by the Swedish naturalist Carl Linnaeus in the tenth edition of his Systema Naturae. He placed it with the other bustards in the genus Otis and coined the binomial name Otis tetrax. Linnaeus designated the type locality as Europe but this has been restricted to France. The little bustard is now placed in its own genus Tetrax that was introduced in 1817 by Thomas Forster. The species is considered to be monotypic: no subspecies are recognised. The genus name and the specific epithet tetrax is the Latin word for an unidentified gamebird.

== Description ==
Although the smallest Palearctic bustard, the little bustard is still pheasant-sized at 42–45 cm (17–18 in) long with a 90–110 cm (35–43 in) wingspan and a weight of 830 g (29 oz). In flight, the long wings are extensively white. The breeding male is brown above and white below, with a grey head and a black neck bordered above and below by white.

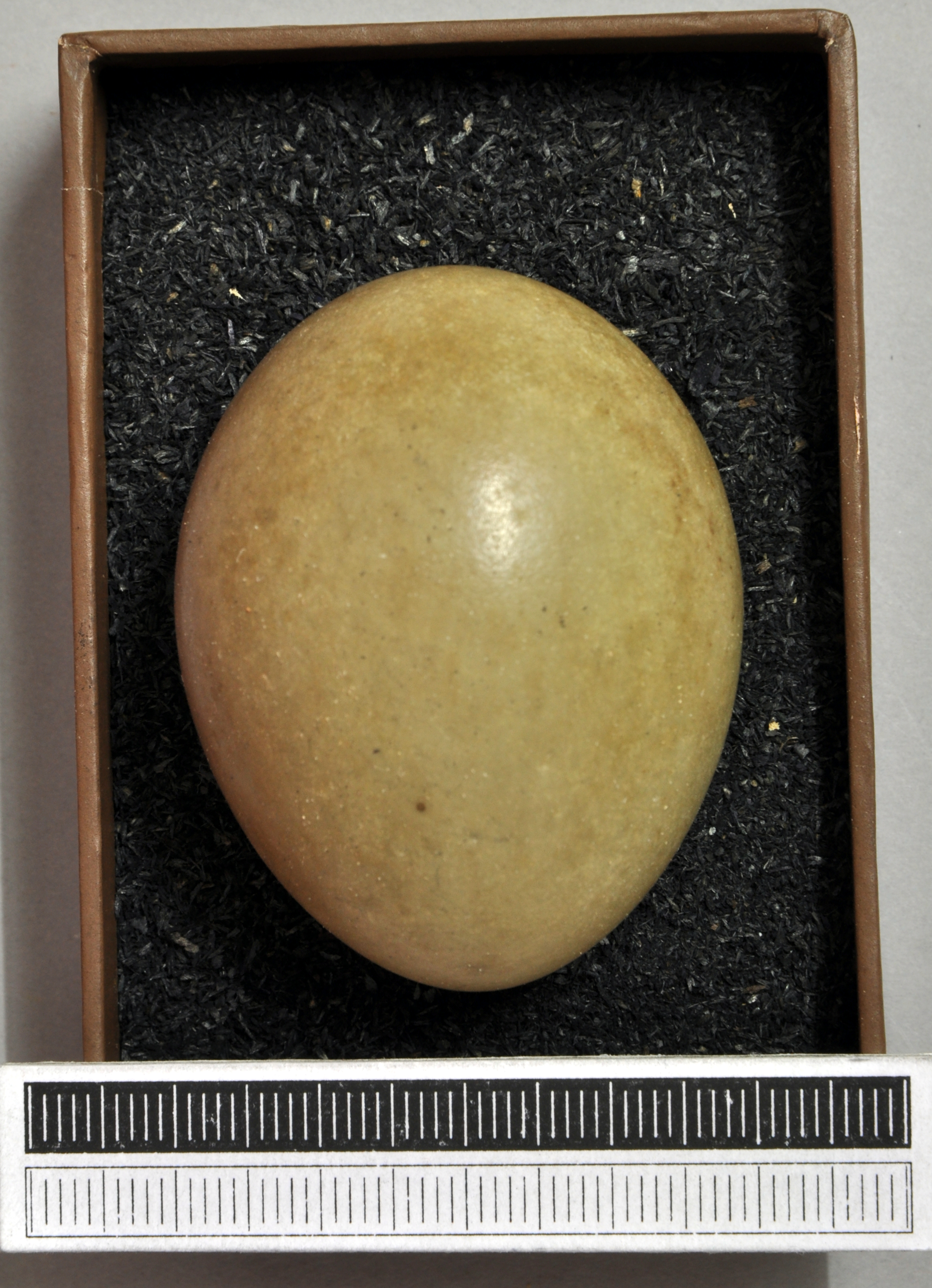
Egg, Collection Museum Wiesbaden

The female and non-breeding male lack the dramatic neck pattern, and the female is marked darker below than the male. Immature bustards resemble females. Both sexes are usually silent, although the male has a distinctive "raspberry-blowing" call: prrt.

== Distribution and habitat ==
It breeds in Southern Europe and in Western and Central Asia. Southernmost European birds are mainly resident, but other populations migrate further south in winter. The central European population once breeding in the grassland of Hungary became extinct several decades ago. The species is declining due to habitat loss throughout its range. It used to breed more widely, for example ranging north to Poland occasionally. It is only a very rare vagrant to Great Britain despite breeding in France. On 20 December 2013, the Cypriot newspapers Fileleftheros and Politis, as well as news website 'SigmaLive', reported the discovery of a dead little bustard in the United Nations Buffer Zone. The bird had been shot by poachers hunting illegally in the zone. The shooting was particularly controversial amongst conservationists and birders since the little bustard is a very rare visitor to Cyprus and had not been officially recorded in Cyprus since December 1979.

The bird's habitat is open grassland and undisturbed cultivation, with plants tall enough for cover. Males and females do not differ markedly in habitat selection. It has a stately slow walk, and tends to run when disturbed rather than fly. It is gregarious, especially in winter.

Tracking of male little bustards has revealed that they are nocturnal migrants that make frequent stopovers in non-irrigated and irrigated croplands to reach more productive agricultural post-breeding areas.

== Behaviour and ecology ==
=== Food and feeding ===
This species is omnivorous, taking seeds, insects, rodents and reptiles.

=== Breeding ===
Like other bustards, the male little bustard has a flamboyant display with foot stamping and leaping in the air. Females lay 3 to 5 eggs on the ground.
