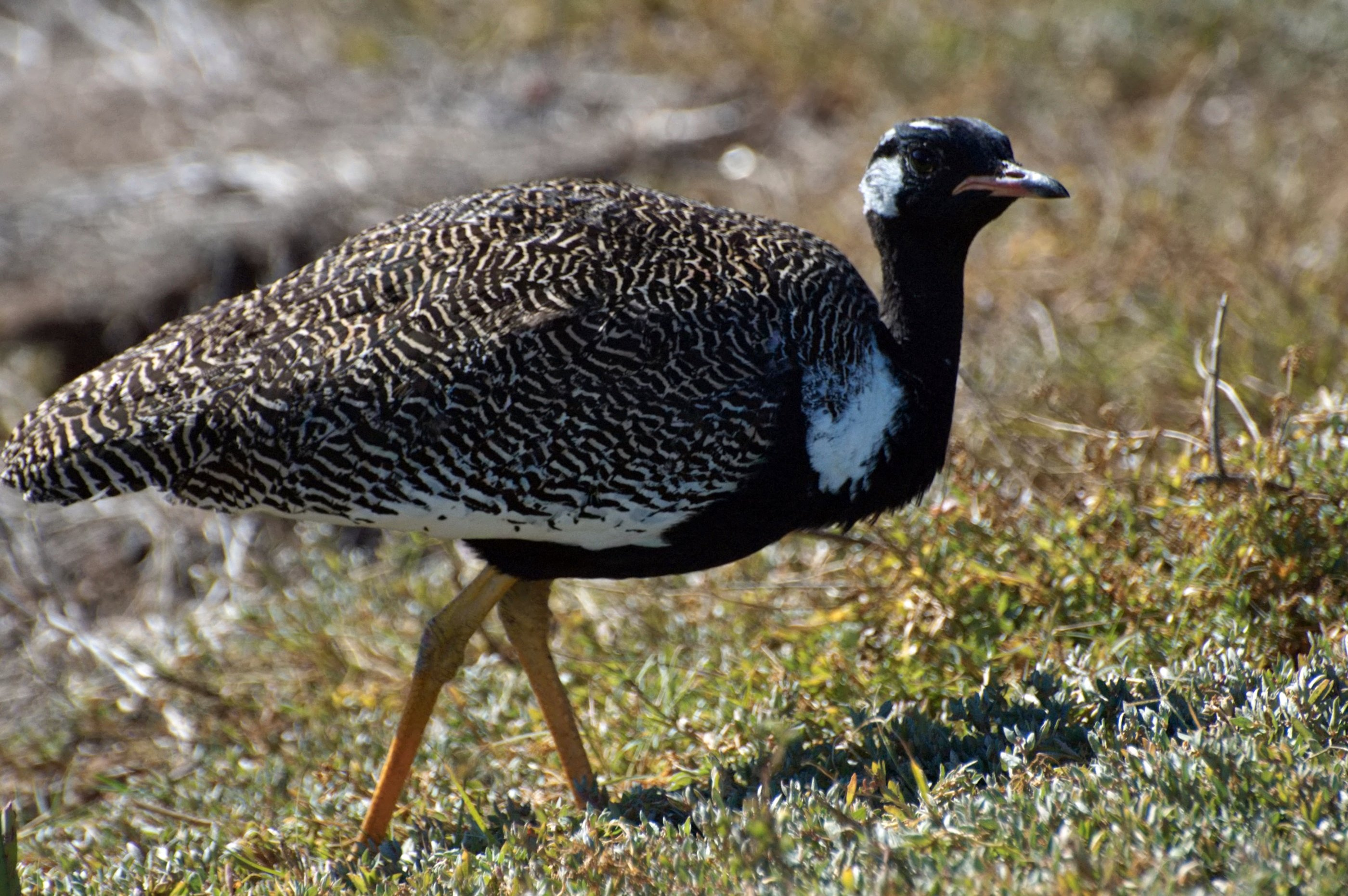

Conservation status
- Vulnerable (IUCN 3.1)
- CITES Appendix II

Scientific classification
- Kingdom: Animalia
- Phylum: Chordata
- Class: Aves
- Order: Otidiformes
- Family: Otididae
- Genus: Afrotis
- Species: A. afra

Binomial name
- Afrotis afra (Linnaeus, 1758)

Synonyms
- Otis afra Linnaeus, 1758; Eupodotis afra (Linnaeus, 1758)

= Southern black korhaan =

Species of bird

The southern black korhaan (Afrotis afra), also known as the black bustard, is a species of bird in the bustard family, Otididae. This small bustard is found in southwestern South Africa, from Namaqualand, south to Cape Town and east to Makhanda. It prefers semi-arid habitats such as grasslands, shrublands and savannas where it can easily prey on ground-dwelling arthropods and eat seeds. It reproduces yearly in the spring and will lay about one or two eggs per breeding season.

Numbers have declined rapidly as much of its habitat has been converted to agricultural land and remaining tracts are often fragmented. Due to this habitat destruction, the species is considered vulnerable by the IUCN Red List.

== Taxonomy ==
The southern black korhaan was one of the many bird species originally described by Carl Linnaeus in the 1758 10th edition of his Systema Naturae, where it was given the binomial name of Otis afra. Formerly known as Eupodotis afra, it is now classified as Afrotis afra. They belong to the bustard family, Otididae.

It was previously thought that the southern black korhaan and the northern black korhaan were the same species (the northern black korhaan being a sub-species, E. afra afroaoides). They are now classified as different species due to their disjunct ranges and habitats, and differences in plumage, vocalizations and social systems. They also have differences in their mitochondrial DNA.

"Southern black korhaan" has been designated as the official common name for the species by the International Ornithologists' Union (IOC).

== Description ==
A couple (female in background)

The southern black korhaan is a ground-dwelling bird with some sexual dimorphism. The male's main body plumage is of a checkered black and white with a black underbelly and neck. It also displays some white on the underwings, on the cheeks and in stripes over the eyes. The female, in contrast, has the whole of her head, neck and breast the same colour as her body, which is checkered brown and white. Both the female and the male have bright yellow legs.

The male is slightly larger than the female. The male has a wingspan of 27 cm (10.6 in) to 28 cm (11.0 in) and the female a wingspan of 25 cm (9.8 in) to 26 cm (10.2 in). The tail is about 12 cm (4.7 in) to 13 cm (5.1 in) long. The male's bill is larger with a length of 3.8 cm to 3.9 cm (1.5 in), while the female's is about 3.5 cm (1.4 in) long. The bill is of a reddish colour with a black tip. Lifespan averages 10 years.

== Distribution and habitat ==
The southern black korhaan is endemic to southwestern South Africa, ranging from Namaqualand, south to Cape Town, and east to Makhanda. As of 2020, its estimated suitable habitat throughout its range is approximately 20,355 km^{2} (7,859 sq mi). It prefers open, semi-arid habitats such as shrub-lands and savannahs where it can easily prey on grass-dwelling arthropods, also grasslands adjoining marshland.

== Behaviour ==
=== Vocalisation ===
Vocalisation has been described as a "continuous cackling sound". It is mostly the male that calls, as it vocalizes very often and very loudly. The call is a raucous "knock-me-down, knock-me-down".

=== Breeding ===
The southern black korhaan is a polygynous species, which means males mate with multiple females. To attract females, males will display high flying. They breed in the spring. Females lays one or two eggs in a depression in the soil and covers them with strands of grass. The eggs are of an olive or brown colour with some dark black spots. Only the females provide parental care as they take care of the eggs and then raise the chicks.

=== Diet ===
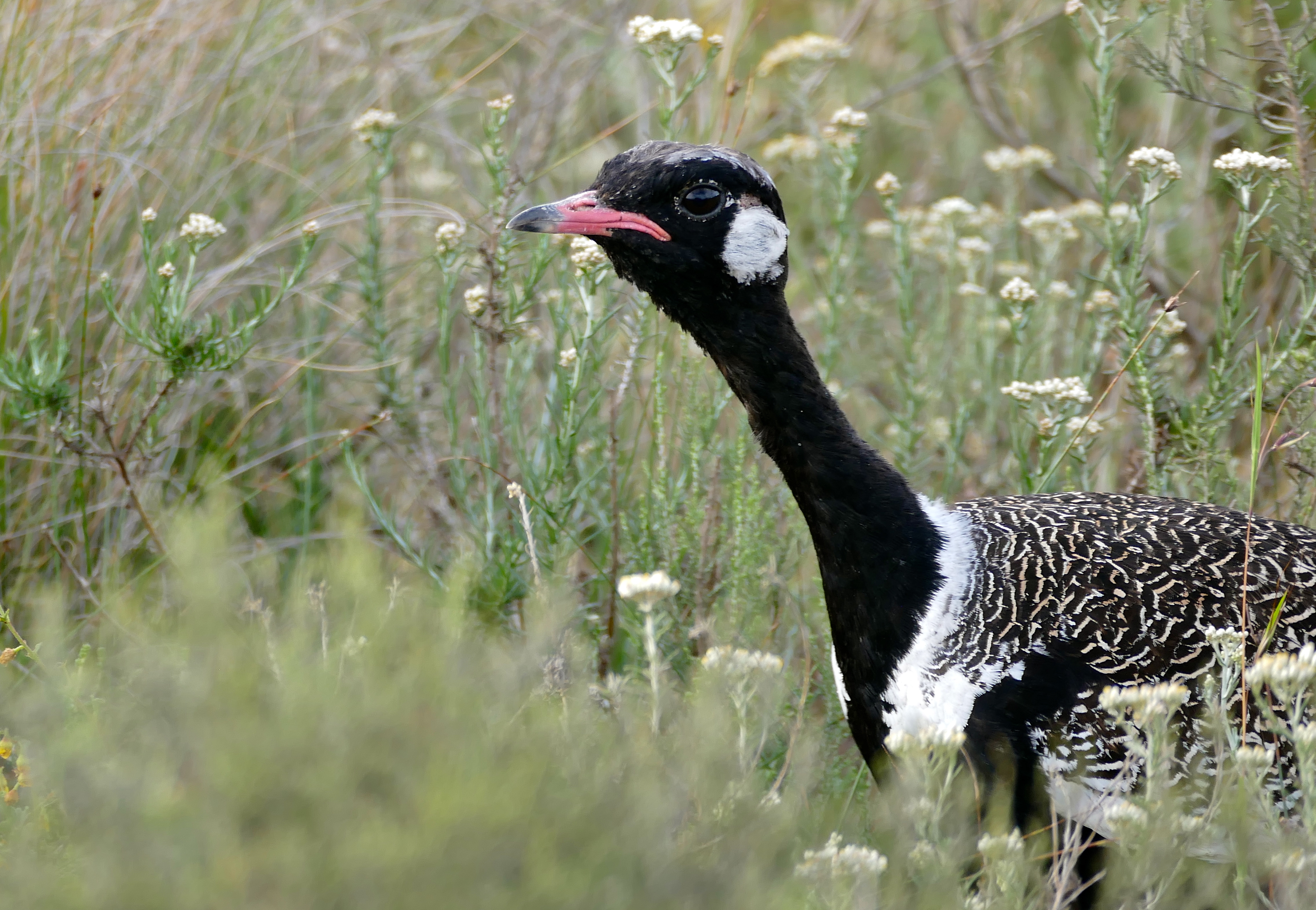
Southern black korhaan (Afrotis afra) – male

This is an omnivorous species. Two-thirds of its diet is made up of arthropods, and it will eat termites, beetles, grasshoppers and ants. The rest of its diet is composed of plant matter, mostly seeds. It partakes in a mutualistic relationship with Acacia cyclops, a species of Acacia; the southern black korhaan benefits from the seeds as they are a readily available food source, and in return, disperses the seeds to good germination sites. The southern black korhaan will also ingest grit and other small rocks to help in digestion by assisting the grinding process in the gizzard. A study has also shown that two thirds of birds have nematode parasites in their intestinal tract.

== Status and conservation ==
Recent studies have shown that the southern black korhaan's population has been decreasing lately, which has raised concerns about its conservation status. The species was once very common but it is now becoming rarer as its habitat is being fragmented. Hence, it has been deemed vulnerable by the IUCN Red List of threatened species since October 1, 2016.

The primary threat to these species is the conversion of natural vegetation to agricultural lands as well as aquaculture. This has caused habitat fragmentation and a reduction in available food sources. This reduction in habitat also means less suitable breeding grounds, which has not only affected breeding success, but chick and egg survival rates. Indeed, agricultural lands do not provide sufficient plant cover to protect them from predators such as the pied crow.

Other threats include climate change, human disturbance and diseases.
