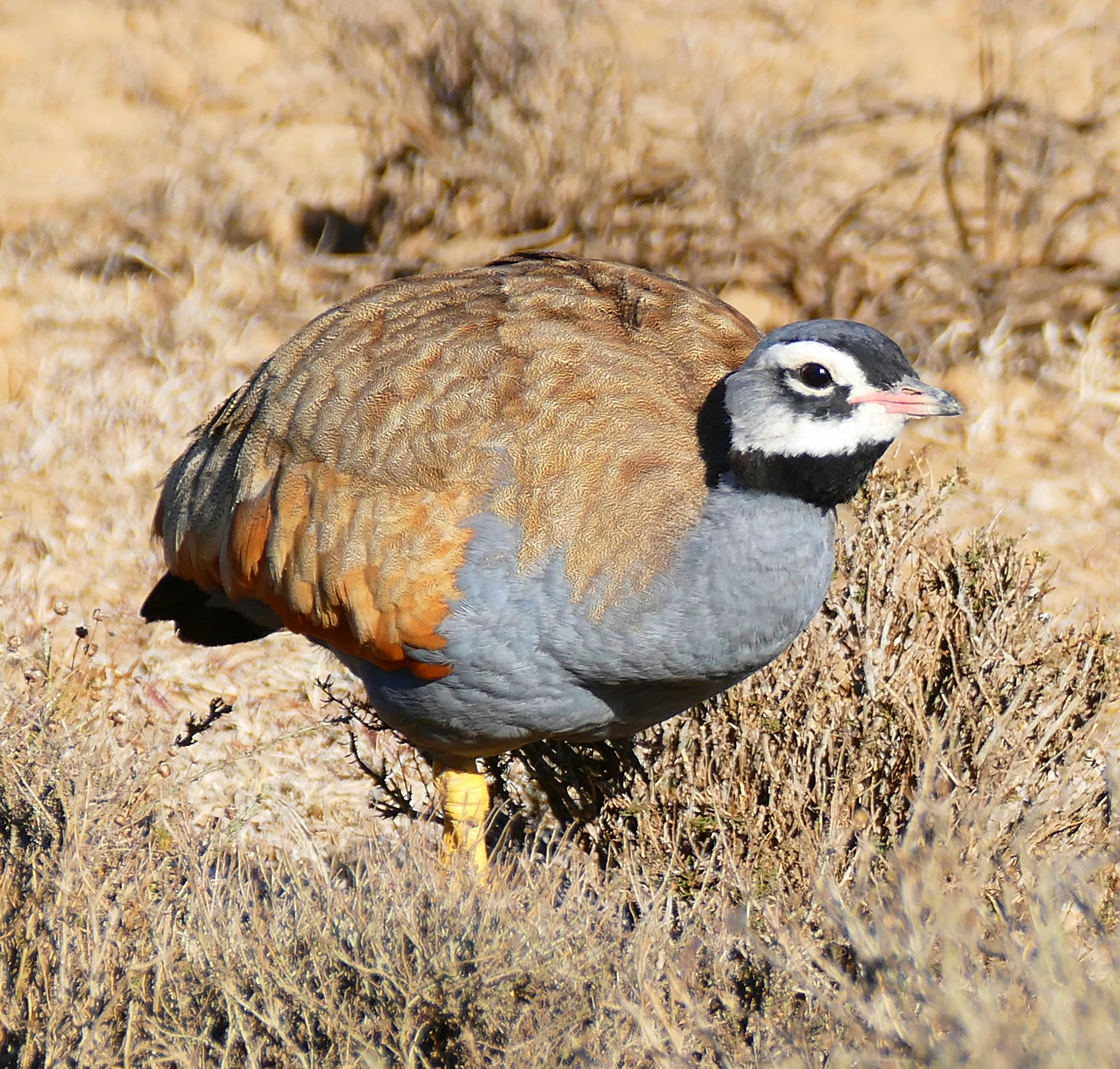
- Male in the Mountain Zebra National Park, Eastern Cape, South Africa

Conservation status
- Near Threatened (IUCN 3.1)
- CITES Appendix II (CITES)

Scientific classification
- Kingdom: Animalia
- Phylum: Chordata
- Class: Aves
- Order: Otidiformes
- Family: Otididae
- Genus: Eupodotis
- Species: E. caerulescens

Binomial name
- Eupodotis caerulescens (Vieillot, 1821)

= Blue korhaan =

Species of bird

The blue korhaan or blue bustard (Eupodotis caerulescens) is a species of bird in the family Otididae which is native to South Africa. Its call is a series of frog-like croaks, usually uttered in flight. Its natural habitat is plateau grassland, dry shrubland, arable land and pastureland. Its preferred habitat is one with short grassland and flat topography.

== Description ==
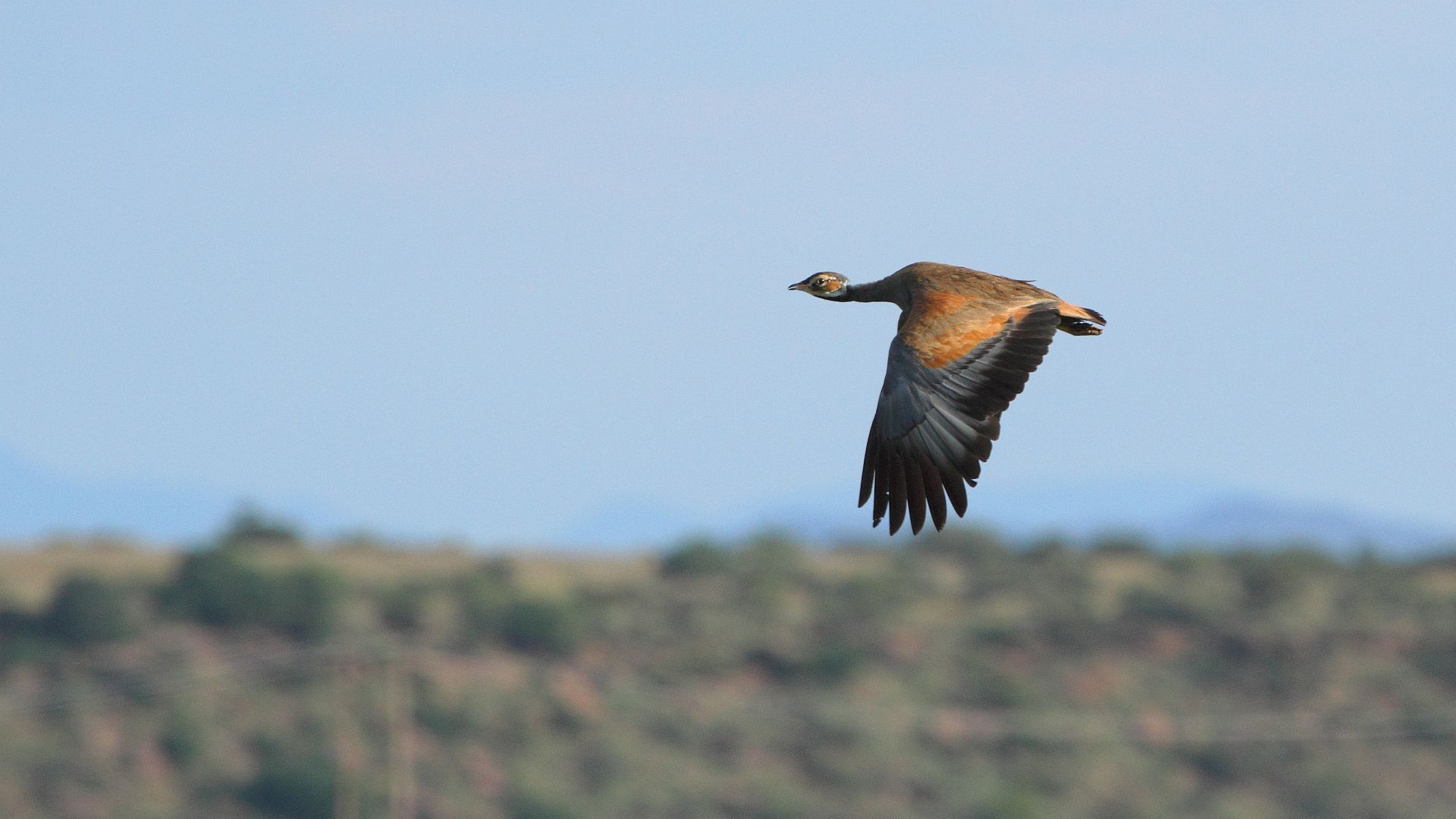
Southern Free State, South Africa

Korhaans are ground-dwelling birds with sturdy bodies, large heads and long necks, long legs and short toes. The blue korhaan is a fairly large bird growing to a total length of 50 to 58 cm (20 to 23 in). The forehead and crown are black, while the sides of the head are white. In males, the back, wings and tail are brown but the neck, throat, breast and belly are bluish-grey. Females are similar in colouring but the neck and underparts are a duller grey and the ear coverts are buff. The legs and feet are yellow. The voice is a series of throaty "krok-kau"s, often heard around dawn and uttered during flight.

== Distribution and habitat ==
The blue korhaan is native to South Africa and the western fringes of Lesotho. Its range extends from Pretoria and Mbombela southwards to Bhisho and amounts to an area of around 356,000 km^{2} (137,000 sq mi). It is found on grassland at altitudes of between 1,500 and 3,000 m (5,000 and 10,000 ft). It favours short grass habitats, with a scattering of karoo-type dwarf shrubs, and with termite mounds but few trees, usually within a kilometre of water. It also occurs in previously cultivated and fallow areas, and in winter crops and pasture.

== Ecology ==
This bird is largely terrestrial; when disturbed it crouches down, and on being approached tends to walk or run away with head dipped. It will flush when alarmed however, flying for a considerable distance. It usually occurs in pairs or in small family groups, and forages for insects, lizards, scorpions, seeds, flowers and leaves. Breeding mainly takes place in October and November. The nest is a scoop on the ground, often in thick foliage, where one to three eggs are laid. Incubation takes about 26 days, and the family may stay together for two years.

== Status ==
The population of this species was estimated to be between 8,000 and 10,000 mature birds in 2017 by the International Union for Conservation of Nature (IUCN). In the Eastern Karoo the population seems to be declining but elsewhere it seems fairly stable. However, according to the IUCN, the area of suitable habitat is being reduced due to grassland being converted for agricultural use, and this is expected to continue. For this reason, the IUCN has assessed the bird's conservation status as being "near threatened".
