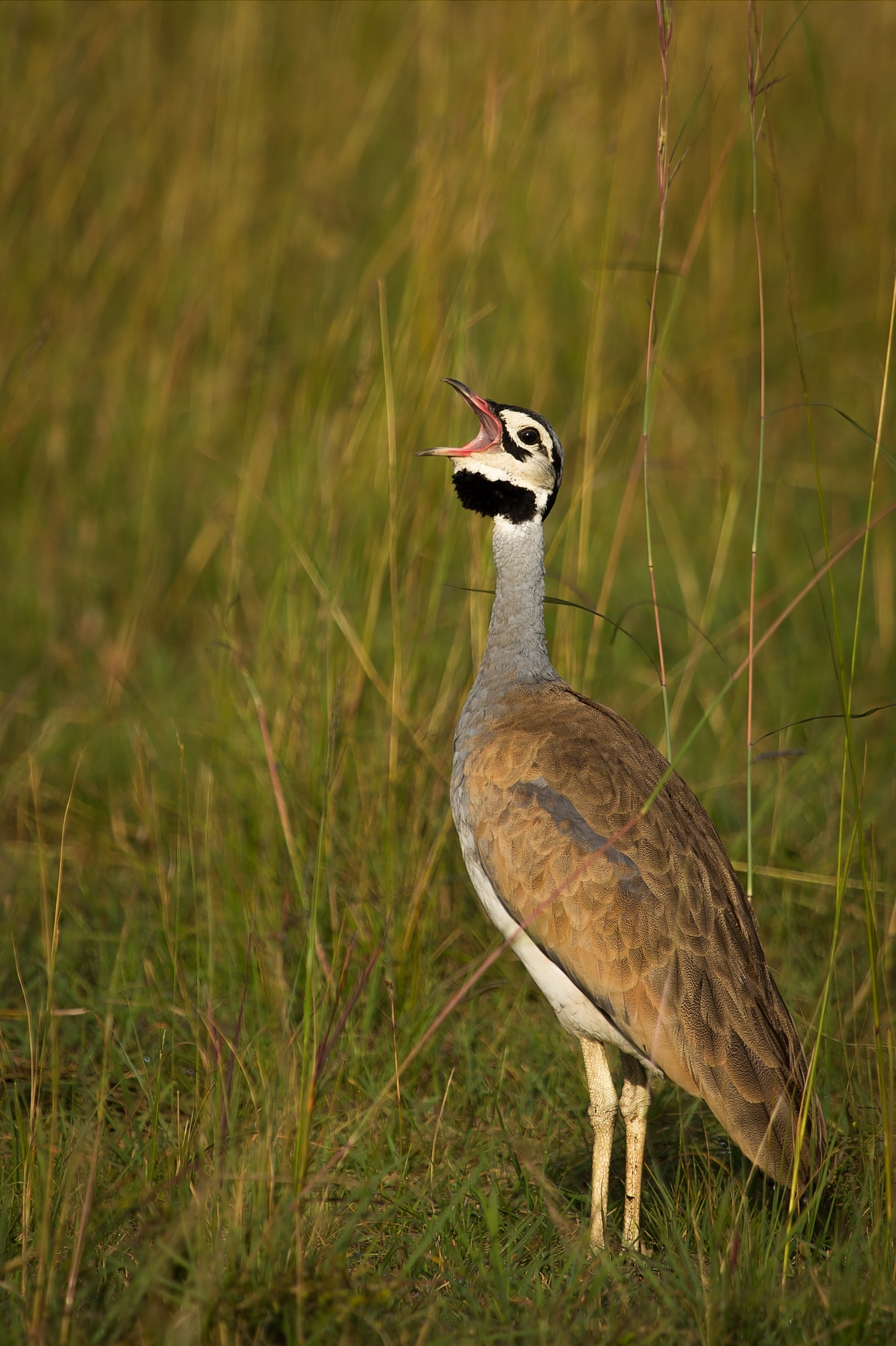
- White-bellied bustard

Scientific classification
- Kingdom: Animalia
- Phylum: Chordata
- Class: Aves
- Order: Otidiformes
- Family: Otididae
- Genus: Eupodotis; Lesson, 1839

Type species
- Otis rhaad Rüppell, 1837

= Eupodotis =

Genus of birds

Eupodotis is a genus of bird in the bustard family Otididae. It contains two species, all restricted to Africa. Species in the genera Afrotis and Lophotis are sometimes included in this genus; however some authorities separate the Karoo korhaan, Rüpell's Korhaan and little brown bustard as a separate genus Heterotetrax.

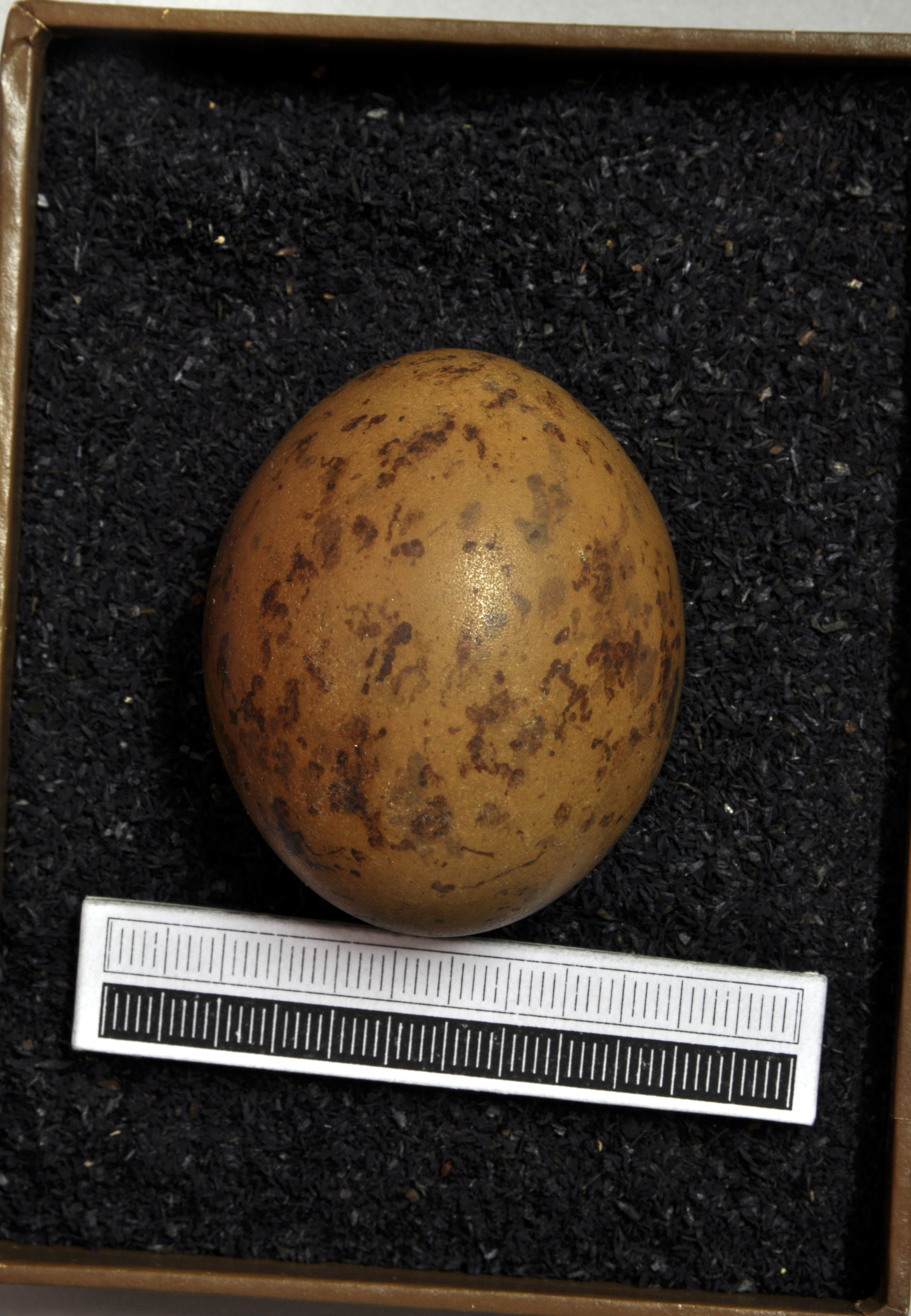
Egg, Collection Museum Wiesbaden

== Species ==
Genus Eupodotis – Lesson, 1839 – two species
Common name	Scientific name and subspecies	Range	Size and ecology	IUCN status and estimated population
White-bellied bustard	Eupodotis senegalensis (Vieillot, 1821) Five subspecies: E. s. barrowii (Gray 1829) (Barrow's/southern white-bellied Bustard); E. s. canicollis (Reichenow 1881) (Somali white-bellied knorhaan); E. s. erlangeri (Reichenow 1905); E. s. mackenziei White 1945; E. s. senegalensis (Vieillot 1821)	Sub-Saharan Africa	Size: Habitat: Diet:	LC
Blue korhaan	Eupodotis caerulescens (Vieillot, 1821)	South Africa	Size: Habitat: Diet:	NT
