= Waza National Park =

National park in Cameroon

- French: Parc National de Waza
- IUCN category II (national park)
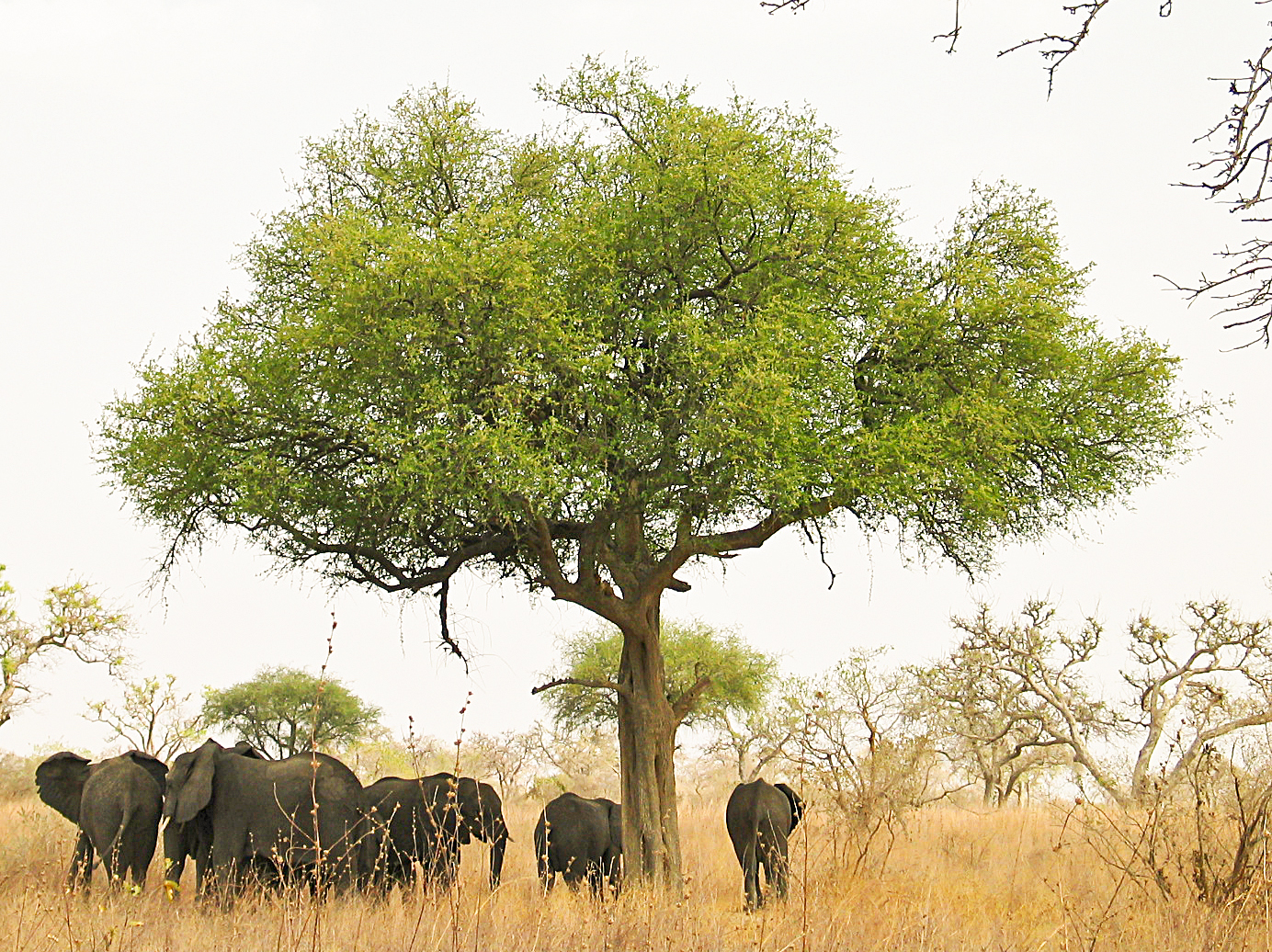
- Elephants in Waza National Park

- Location within Cameroon
- Location: Far North Province, Cameroon
- Coordinates: 11°20′N 14°44′E
- Area: 1,700 km^{2} (660 sq mi)
- Established: 1934
- Governing body: Cameroon Ministry of Environment and the Protection of Nature

Waza National Park is a national park in the Department of Logone-et-Chari, in Far North Region, Cameroon. It was founded in 1934 as a hunting reserve, and covers a total of 1,700 km^{2} (660 sq mi). Waza achieved national park status in 1968, and became a UNESCO biosphere reserve in 1979.

For the preservation and conservation of the biodiversity of the park, a Management Master Plan was drawn up in 1997, reported to be the first of its kind in Cameroon. The park is adjacent to the Chingurmi-Duguma sector of Nigeria's Chad Basin National Park. There is also a proposal to combine this park with the Waza Logone floodplain as a Ramsar Site. The forest dwellers who had their villages within the park were resettled on the borders of the park, after it was established. This was done with the objective of creating a social buffer to poaching activities and preserve the park's resources.

The dominant vegetation is in the transition zone between the Sahel and Sudan savanna, containing acacia and open Yaéré savannah forests. The prominent faunal species reported to inhabit the park are the lion, African bush elephant, hyena, hartebeest, roan antelope, kob, waterbuck, reedbuck, gazelle, Sudan cheetah and West African giraffe. The avifauna reported are geese, egrets, North African ostriches, herons, pelicans, saddle-billed storks and ibis.

== Geography ==
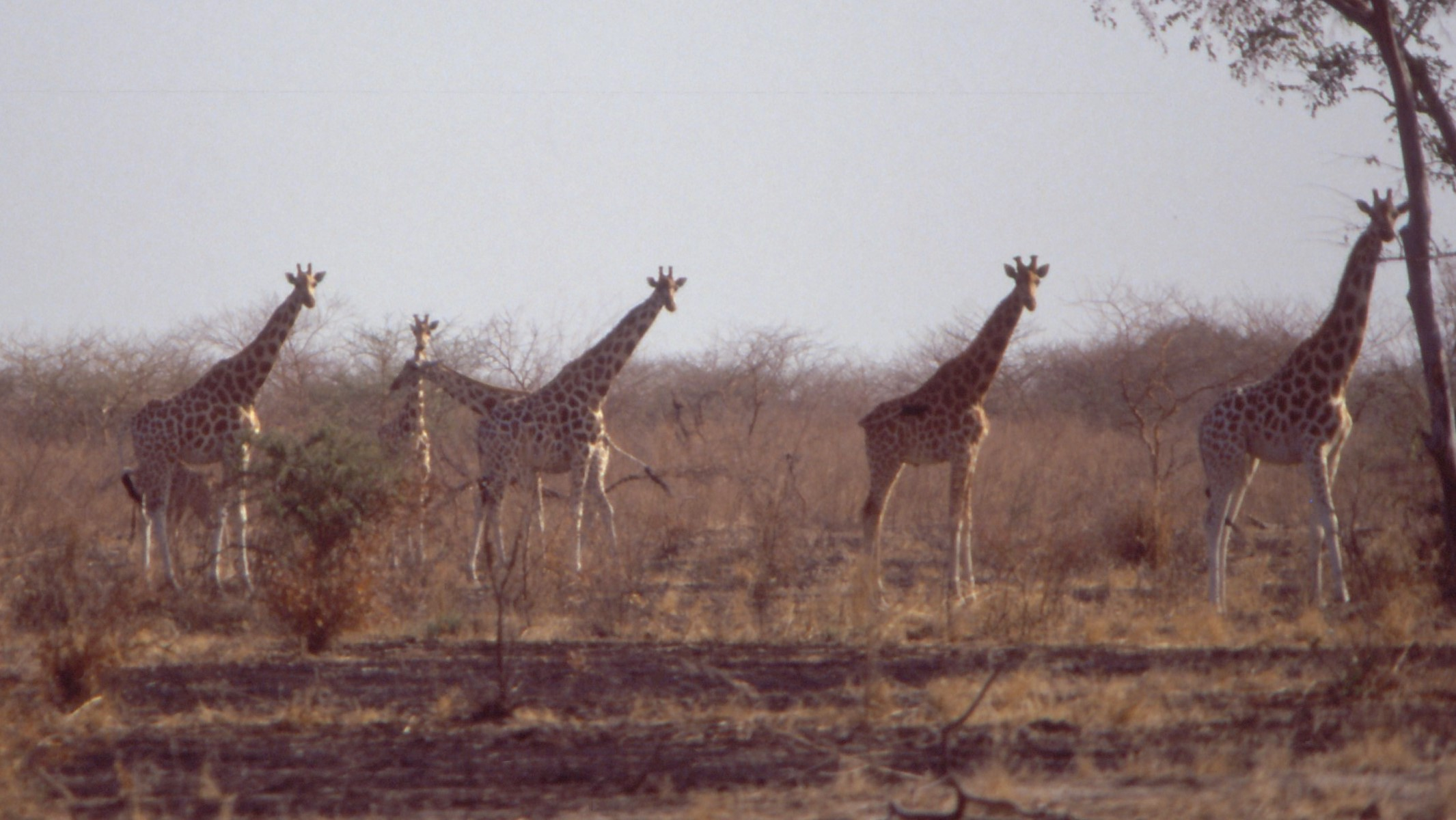
Giraffes in burned grassland during the dry season in December

The park is bounded by the town of Waza to its west, the border with Nigeria, and Chad is only 10 kilometres (6.2 mi) away. The seasonally-flooded "Yaéré" floodplain marks the east and north-east, and the Maroua–Kousséri road is to the west.

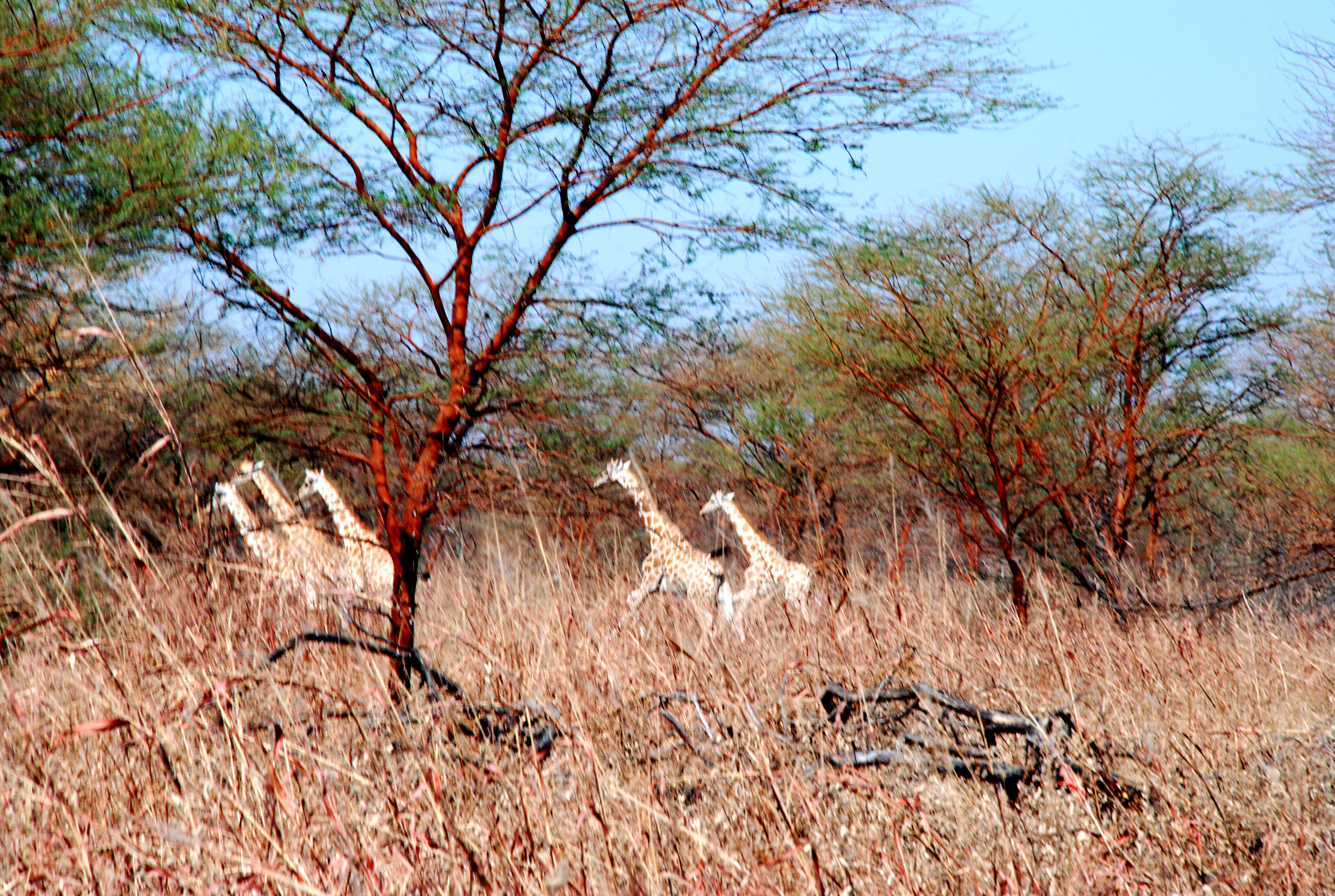
Parc Waza12

The park's habitat is mainly in the “Chad depression” with average elevation in the range of a 300–320 m (980–1,050 ft), thought the highest ground goes up to 500 m (1,600 ft) near Waza village. The topography of the park, however, is generally flat. Sand dunes in the western area of the park denote past desert conditions. The Chad depression was originally covered by Lake Chad. The land classification consists of terrestrial landscapes to the extent of 88%, and the park has 7% shrub land and 5% grassland.

The climate is mostly semi-arid as the average annual precipitation is only 700 mm (28 in) and erratic in its incidence. The rainy months are June to October and the dry season is from November to May, and can sometimes start as early as October. Mean annual temperature is 28 °C (82 °F). The coolest month is December recording a mean monthly minimum temperature of 16 °C (61 °F) and maximum of 33 °C (91 °F). In April, just prior to start of rainy season, the mean monthly minimum is 21 °C (70 °F) and maximum is 41 °C (106 °F).

Soil formations resulting from the erosion of the high mountains in the park primarily consist of tropical ferruginous soils in catenas, hydromorphic soils and vertisols. Heavy clays are the dominant soil type in the park.

With the above topographic, climatic and soil settings, the vegetation types which cover the park are categorized under five broad types of open combretaceous shrub savanna, anogeissus leiocarpus woodland, lannea humilis open grass savanna, acacia seyal tree savanna and Yaéré floodplains with perennial grasses. In the desert conditions, with no perennial streams flowing through the park area, there are no perennial grasses in the park. The water holes are created for animals. The combretaceous shrub savanna consist of Sclerocarya birrea tree savanna, Combretum and Terminalia shrubs and the doum palm Hyphaene thebaica. The Anogeissus leiocarpus woodland is in sandy soils with Mitragyna inermis in pockets near temporary water bodies. Lannea humilis are open grass savanna combined with short annual grasses. Patches of trees and stands of Mitragyna inermis are also reported from small islands near temporary water bodies. In this condition, vegetation reported are in the formations of compact clay. However, the area is very saline due to high evaporation. The fourth category of vegetation comprises Acacia seyal tree savanna growing in black clay soils which gets highly saturated during the rainy months; grasses in these conditions spread very slowly or may even dry up. The last type of vegetation is reported in the Yaéré flood plains, an important area to maintain perennial grasses in the park. The grasses reported are: Vetiveria nigritana, Oryza barthii, Echinochloa pyramidalis and Echinochloa stagnina and a few herbaceous legumes with Sesbania pachycarpa. However, in these conditions, where there are no trees, forest fires are common. A particular feature in the central and western parts of the park was that substantial areas were of annual grasses and herbs, interspersed by Acacia seyal shrublands. They were subject to seasonal flooding before the construction of the Maga dam.

The park is 120 km (75 mi) to the north of Maroua and 135 km (84 mi) off Kousseri, and has paved roads. The park is open to the public only from 15 November to 15 June and a guide is mandatory to see the wildlife, according to the rules of the park.

== Wildlife ==
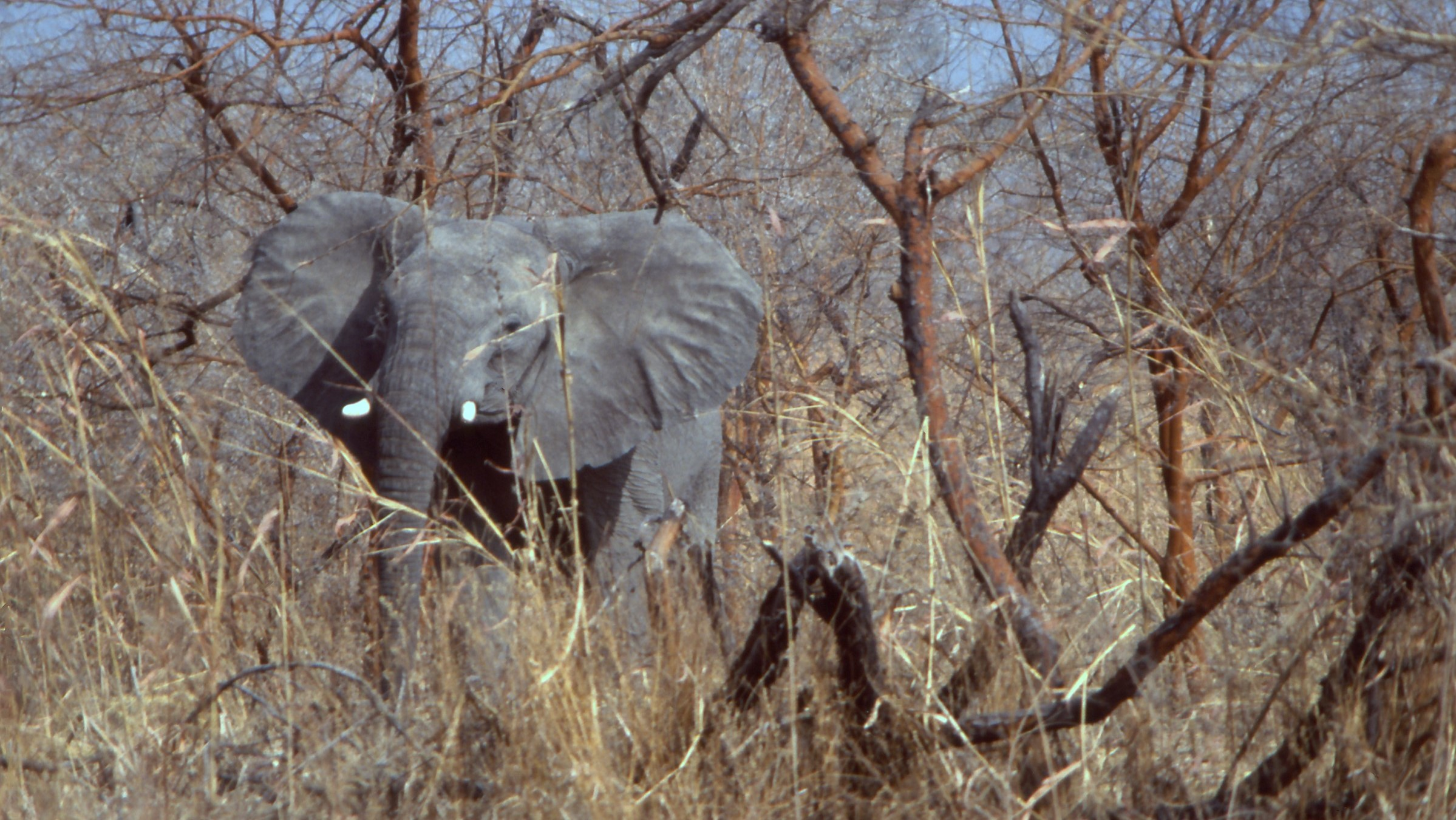
Elephant in Waza National Park

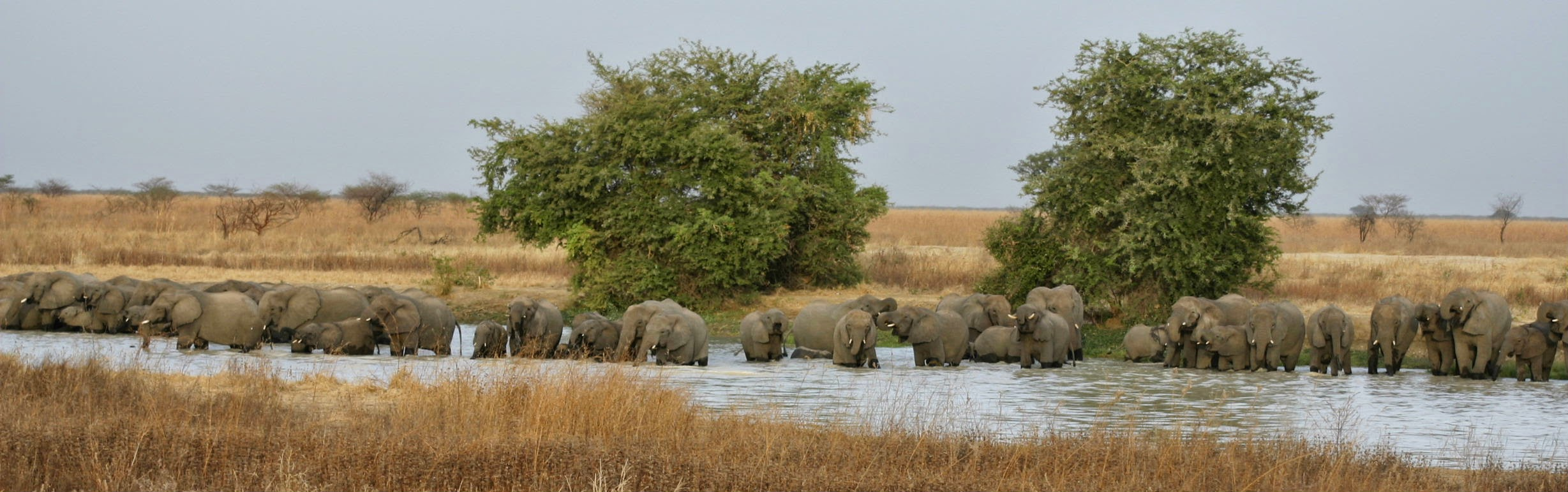
Elephants bathing in Waza National Park

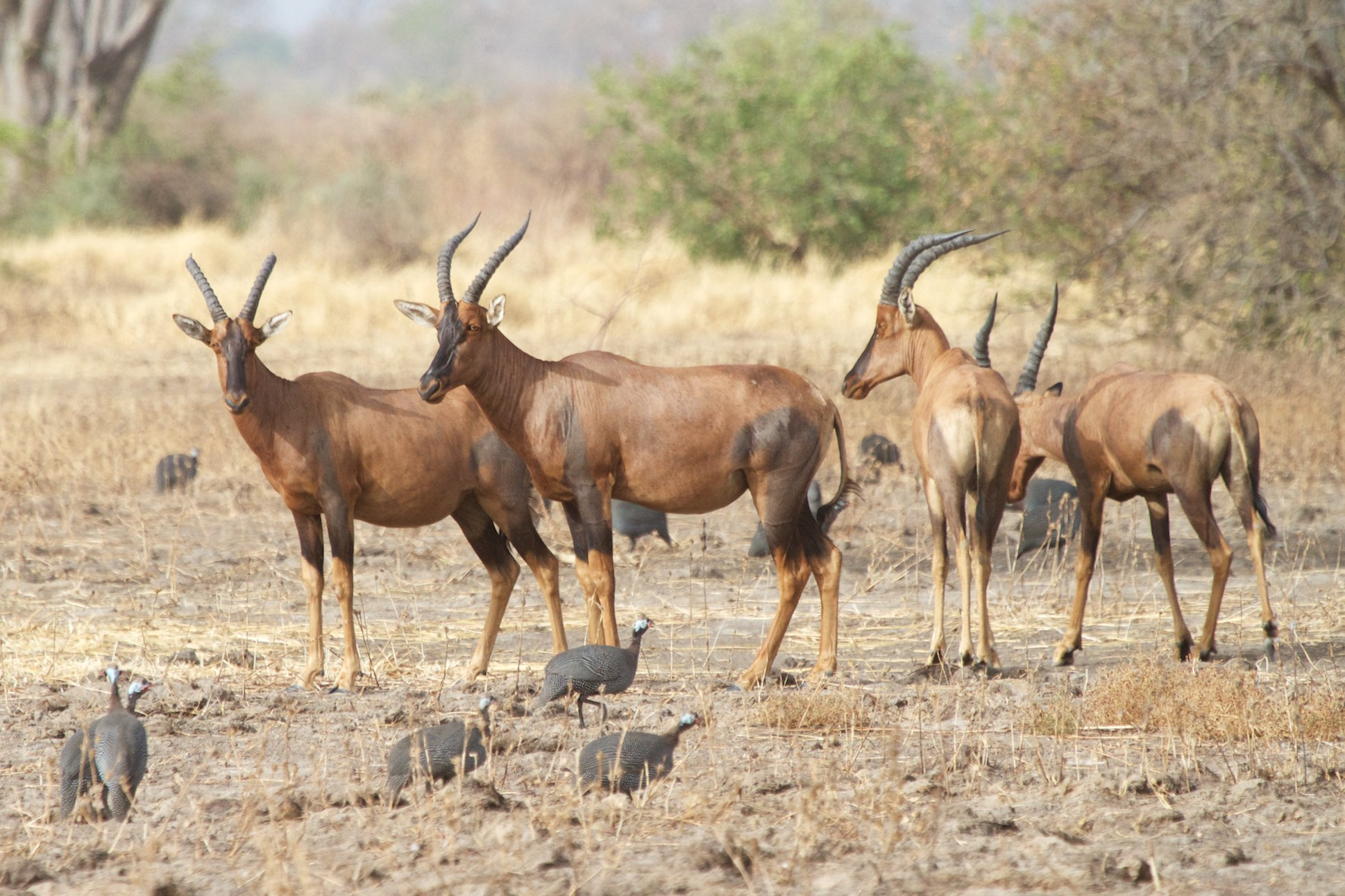
A group of korrigums with the flocks of helmeted guineafowls in Waza National Park

The mammal population in the park is one of the largest in central West Africa. There are 30 species of mammals in the park. Some of the species of interest from the conservation angle are the red-fronted gazelle (Gazella rufifrons) (VU), whose population is on the rise, and the korrigum (Damaliscus lunatus korrigum) (VU), which is stable. The endangered African bush elephant, which feeds in the Vachellia seyal shrublands, creates conflicts even with farmers located far away.

Since 2005, the protected area is considered a Lion Conservation Unit. Waza National Park harbours a dwindling lion population. In 2010, 14–21 lions were estimated to survive. Waza National Park is also home for one of the last populations of the Kordofan giraffe (G. c. antiquorum).

Kob antelope have increased to 5000 in the 1990s since a strong decline in the 1980s. Other large ungulates are warthog and roan. Ostriches have been recorded. Elephants congregate at Mare aux Éléphants, a famous watering hole. Other species noted are hartebeest, korrigum, olive baboon, patas and vervet monkey, leopard, cheetah and nocturnal aardvark.

Amphibians include the eponymous frog Kassina wazae and Waza toad Bufo wazae, the latter now included in Sclerophrys xeros.

== Avifauna ==
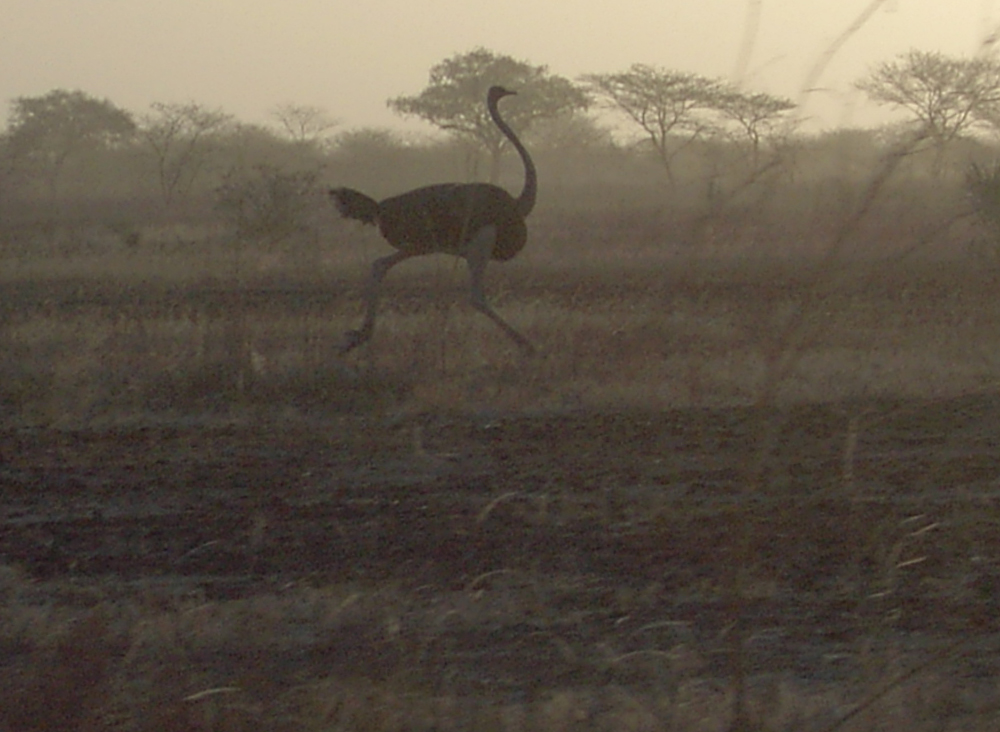
A North African ostrich running at Waza National Park.

There are 379 species of birds in the park including the contiguous Logone floodplain; among the birds that have been sighted are marbled duck, ferruginous duck, greater spotted eagle, scissor-tailed kite in grass lands, lesser kestrel, Nubian bustard (Neotis nuba), quail-plover, Arabian bustard, Cattle Egret, hornbill, various species of storks, Abyssinian roller, and Ostrich. However, some of the species of global conservation concern are: Marmaronetta angustirostris, Aythya nyroca, Clanga clanga, Falco naumanni, Neotis nuba, which has been recorded once, in 1998.

The grassland species of birds reported are: Ortyxelos meiffrenii, Ardeotis arabs, Struthio camelus population in very large number of Dendrocygna viduata and Balearica pavonina. Water bird species seen throughout the year is reported to be more than 20,000.

The key list of birds reported by BirdLife International is: garganey (Anas querquedula), great white pelican (Pelecanus onocrotalus), fox kestrel (Falco alopex), pallid harrier (Circus macrourus), Savile's bustard (Eupodotis savilei), black crowned-crane (Balearica pavonina), African collared-dove (Streptopelia roseogrisea), Senegal parrot (Poicephalus senegalus), red-throated bee-eater (Merops bulocki), Sahelian woodpecker (Dendropicos elachus), piapiac (Ptilostomus afer), Sennar penduline-tit (Anthoscopus punctifrons), red-pate cisticola (Cisticola ruficeps), river prinia (Prinia fluviatilis), Senegal eremomela (Eremomela pusilla), purple glossy-starling (Lamprotornis purpureus), chestnut-bellied starling (Lamprotornis pulcher), black scrub-robin (Cercotrichas podobe), chestnut-crowned sparrow-weaver (Plocepasser superciliosus), Sudan golden sparrow (Passer luteus), bush petronia (Petronia dentata), black-rumped waxbill (Estrilda troglodytes), and waterbirds

== Threats ==
Water supply to the depressions in the park has become a major issue for preservation of biodiversity. This situation has arisen on account of construction of the Maga Dam about 25 km (16 mi) to the south of the park. Irrigation embankments have also been built along the Logone River, which resulted in poorer grasslands and total elimination of fisheries in some areas. This also resulted in drastic reduction of the antelope population. Under the Logone Project artificial waterholes were dug, providing water all through the year, but the carrying capacity of the floodplain has remained low.
A study carried out on the effect of elephants on the survival of acacia trees discovered that the impact is not serious, but needs be monitored in order to ensure that the vegetation in the park is well conserved. The study stresses inter-alia the need to restore the hydrological balance of the Waza–Logone floodplain.
Field studies carried out on the killings of lions by poachers in Waza park has indicated that only about 40 lions remain, and they may soon become extinct. One of the reasons attributed to this is inadequate patrolling. Though the IUCN prescribed a norm of one guard to 5000 ha of protected area, the eco-guards in the park number far less. This situation is now fairly addressed.

== Management ==
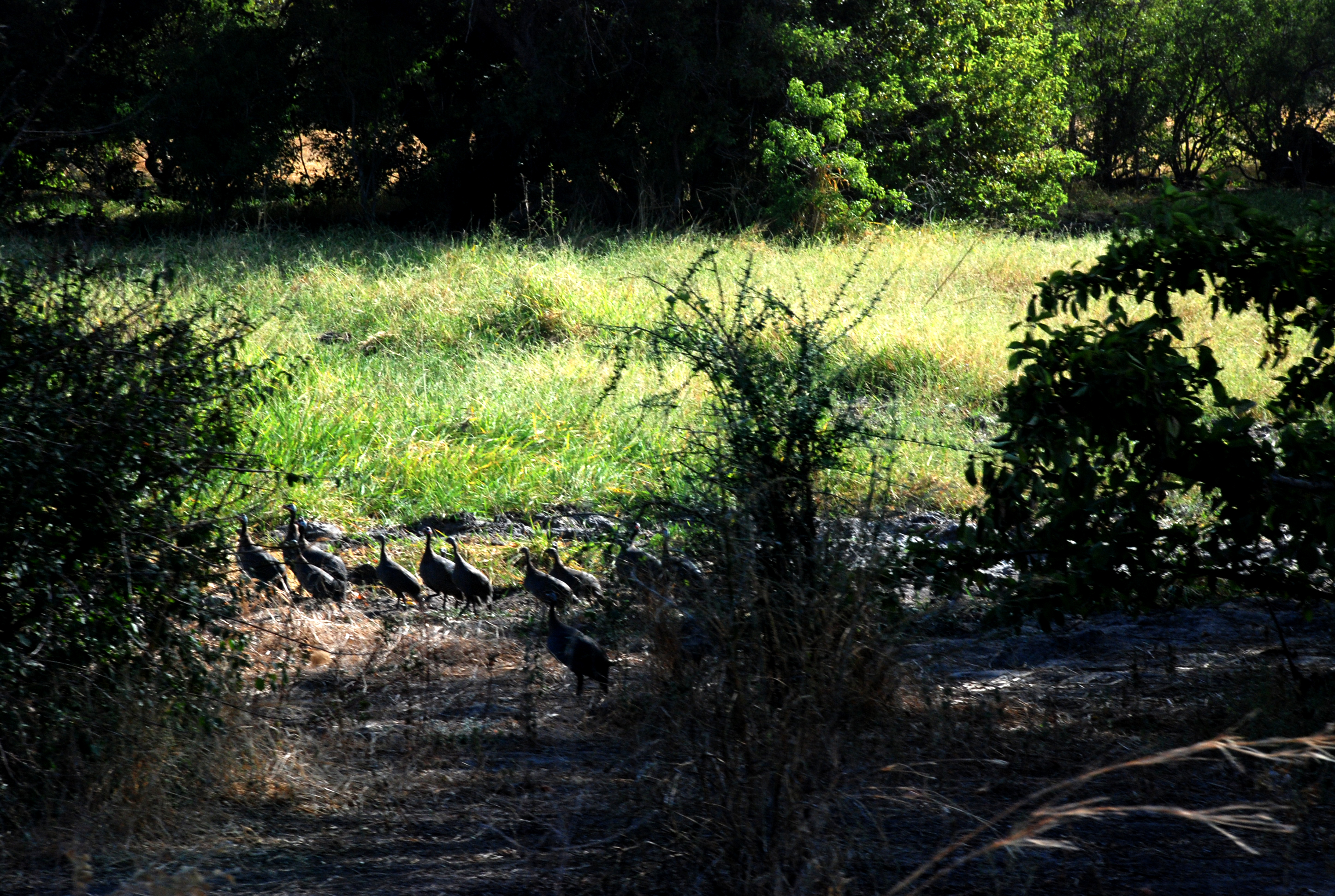
Birds in Waza National Park

The park is managed by the Conservation Service of the Waza National Park, part of the Cameroon Ministry of Environment and the Protection of Nature. Waza, which was considered the best-managed protected area in Cameroon, now has established collaboration with the IUCN Waza-Logone project to improve the water availability conditions, specifically in Waza National Park (1,700 km^{2} (660 sq mi)) and the much smaller Kalamaloue National Park (48 km^{2} (19 sq mi)), as well as other areas adjoining them through the Waza-Logone Project. The area covered under this project, which forms the flood plains of the basin covered by the two river systems of the Logone River to the Logomatya River, contributed significantly to the floodplain Biosphere Reserve, and sustained a very large number of mammals and birds which depended on the annual inundation of the flood plain. With the construction of the Maga Dam, built for irrigated agriculture of rice, the water resource contribution to the flood plains underwent a drastic reduction. To improve the sustainability of the flood plains of the two parks, IUCN embarked on a project titled "IUCN’s Waza-Logone Project" with specific objectives of improving fish production, enhance the quality of grazing lands on which the local population were dependent; and to also increase the surface water for subsistence and proliferation of vegetation and wildlife, including avifauna not only of resident birds but also birds that migrate from Europe during the winter season. Under this project, launched by IUCN in 1994 in collaboration with the Ministry of Environment and the Protection of Nature of Cameroon, the hydrological condition of the wetland has undergone improvements following creation of two seasonal watercourses that interconnect the Logone River with the Logomatya River and facilitates water flows spreading to the floodplains. This plan has worked out well and wetlands conditions of the flood plains is reported to have improved substantially.

Under this project, a management plan has been evolved. A local steering committee has become functional. The project has envisaged controlled harvesting of a few natural products such as straw and gum arabic under field trials, though their extraction has continued even after the park was established.

In 1983, the park had a staff of twenty-five rangers; however, as of 2005, that number had dropped to seven, and poachers from Chad, Nigeria, and Cameroon itself were reported to have gone on a "rampage for the park’s resources". Also in 2005 the Netherlands World Conservation Union Committee agreed to pay for an additional sixteen "eco-rangers" who would assist the regular ones.

Floodplain rehabilitation to enhance the carrying capacity of the flood-plain started in 1994, and is reported to have some beneficial effects in the park. As the Waza National Park is the major beneficiary from the project, the statistics show that 370 species of resident and migratory birds are now found in the Waza-Logone area which covers eight specific habitat types, and the number of waterfowl had increased from 59,000 in 1993 to 87,000 in 1997. Similarly, fish production from the flood plains had increased to 2,000 tonnes (dry weight) in 1996/1997 (fish species bred covered Clarias sp., Tilapia sp., Alestes sp., Petrocephalus sp., Labeo sp. and many others. The yield from the pastures was reflected in the growth of livestock to about 100,000 units in the dry season.

== See also ==
- Tourism in Cameroon
- Wildlife of Cameroon
