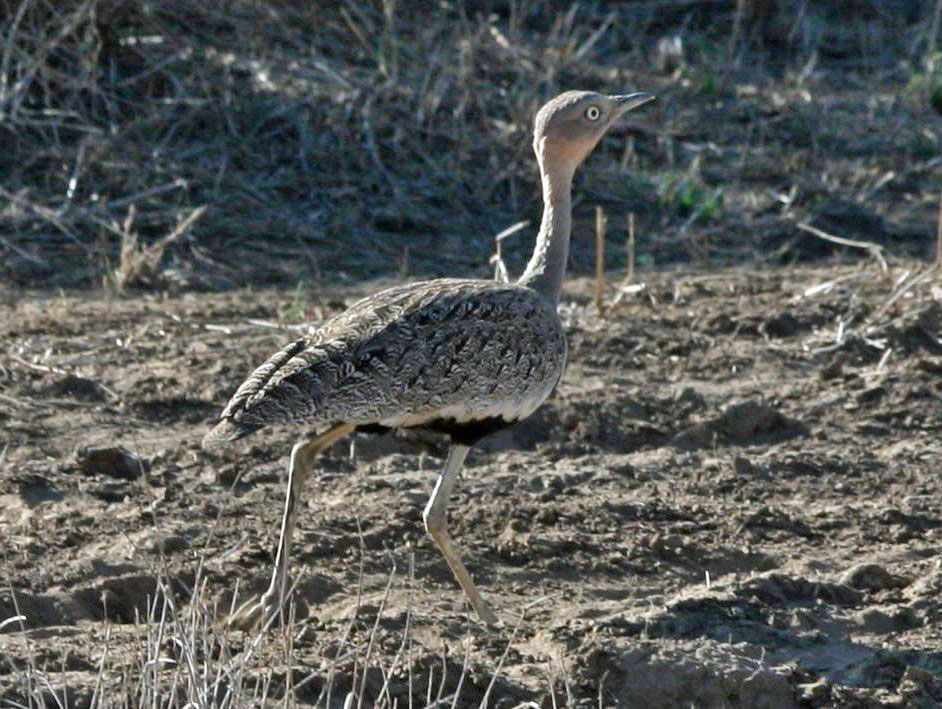

Conservation status
- Least Concern (IUCN 3.1)
- CITES Appendix II

Scientific classification
- Kingdom: Animalia
- Phylum: Chordata
- Class: Aves
- Order: Otidiformes
- Family: Otididae
- Genus: Lophotis
- Species: L. gindiana

Binomial name
- Lophotis gindiana (Oustalet, 1881)
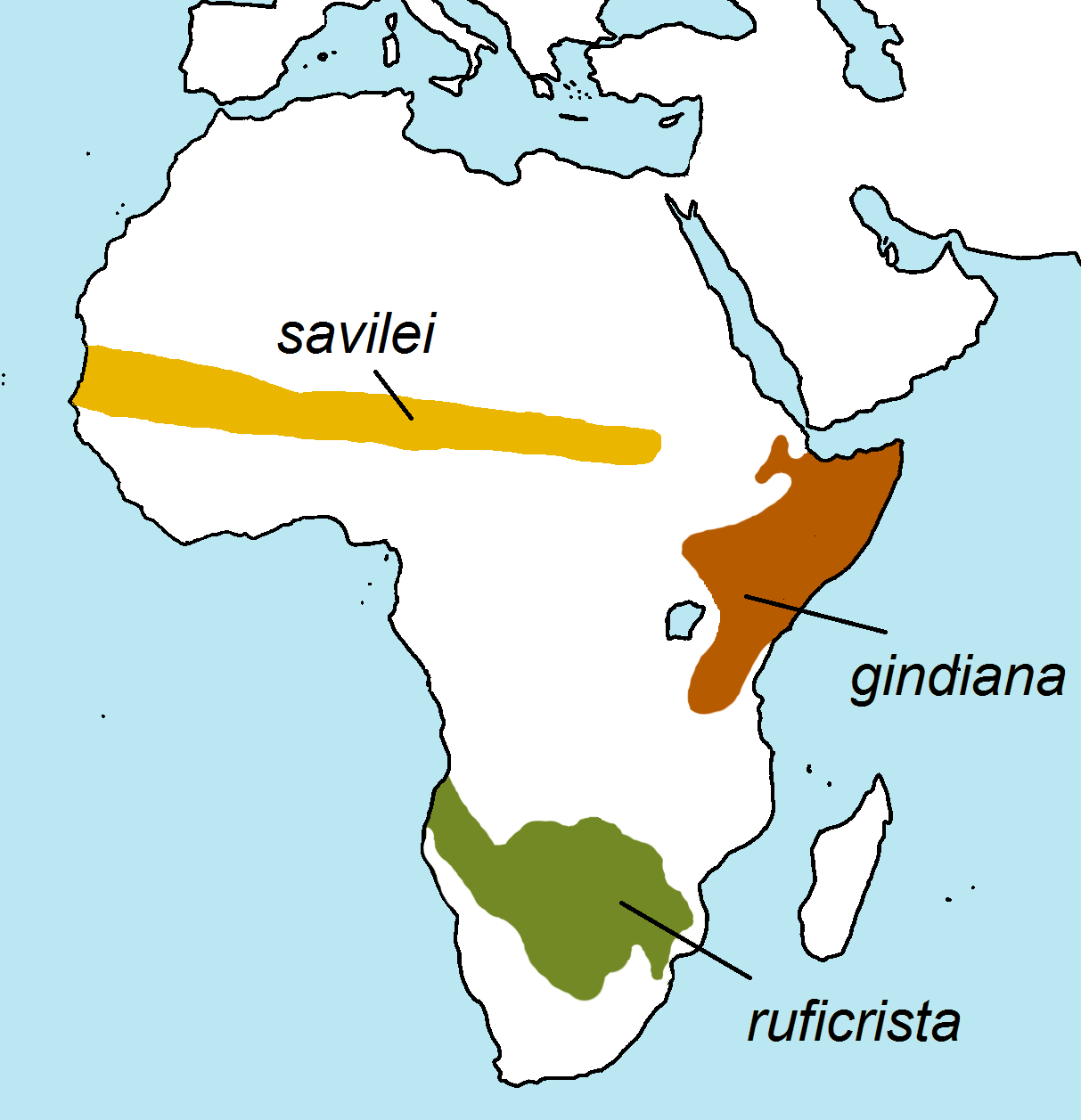
- Range of Lophotis gindiana

= Buff-crested bustard =

Species of bird

The buff-crested bustard (Lophotis gindiana) is a medium-sized bird of East Africa; Somalia, Ethiopia, Kenya belonging to the family Otididae. The populations are stable and the species is of least concern.

== Description ==
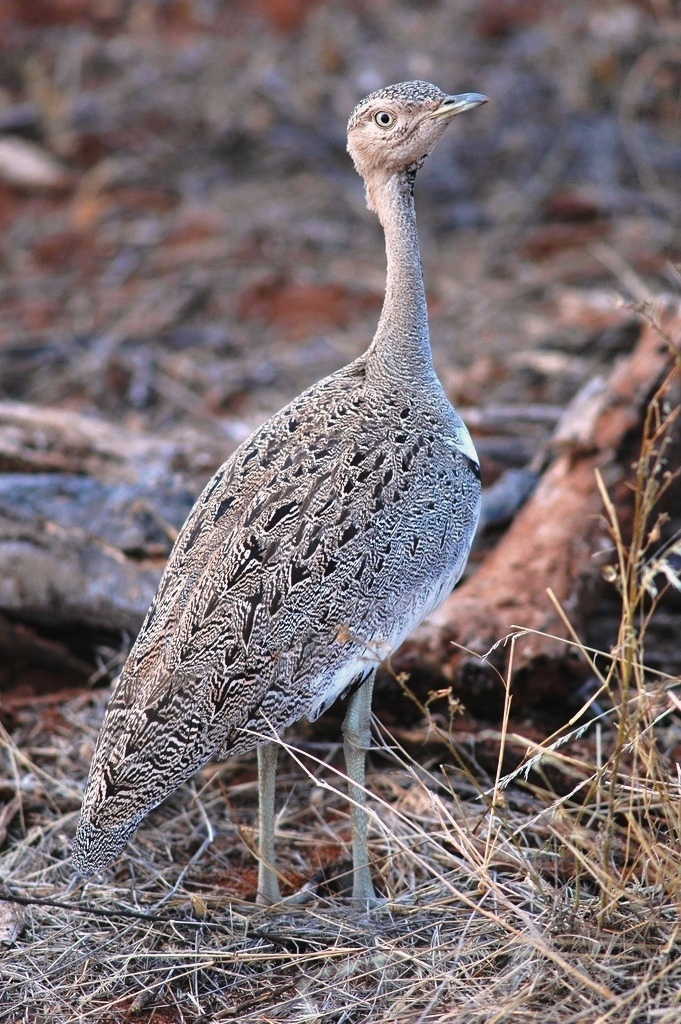
A female buff-crested bustard

The buff-crested bustard is a medium-sized East African bird that can reach up to 60 cm (24 in) in height. Compared to other African bustards, this species is relatively small. Male buff-crested bustards weigh between 675 and 900 grams (24 and 32 oz). Mature males display a black stripe that extends from the throat to the breast. The male plumage is grey or buff, except for the black stripe and dark underside of the body. Most bustards of this family are sexually dimorphic; the male and female differ in plumage coloration and size. On the female, the line visible on the throat is duller and the overall grey coloration seen in the male is replaced by a light brown. As a result of ground-dwelling behaviour, the birds lack a hind toe and do not perch. The species gets its name from the coloured feather crest shown in males, but which is not present in females. When the bird's wings are extended, a large white patch is visible under each wing.

== Taxonomy ==
The buff-crested bustard (Lophotis gindiana) belongs to the family Otididae within the order Gruiformes. Otididae, or the bustard family, contains 25 species of extant bustards. The Lophotis genus includes the Savile's bustard, red-crested bustard (or red-crested korhaan), and buff-crested bustard. These three species are sometimes considered as conspecifics due to physical and behavioural similarities. The buff-crested bustard is sometimes referred to as Eupodotis ruficrista gindiana, referencing to the genus it was previously assigned to when considered a subspecies of the red-crested bustard. Recent genetic analysis rejects the combined supergenus Eupodotis, and considers the genera Lophotis a distinct lineage outside of Eupodotis.

== Habitat and distribution ==
Although they exist throughout East Africa, buff-crested bustards are most common in Ethiopia. There, they can be seen throughout the southern regions, east of the Rift Valley. The bird is a non-migrating resident in Sudan, Somalia, Eritrea, Uganda, Tanzania, and Kenya. The buff-crested bustard is sedentary and can be found in thorny scrub and arid stony desert habitats. In Kenya, it favours arid to semiarid climates, and is absent from sub-humid areas in the coastal strip. It is different from most bustards in that it is less likely to be seen in high grasses, preferring ecosystems established on stony or sandy soils. The female's coloration offers optimal camouflage in these habitats.

== Behaviour ==
=== Vocalizations ===
The bird is more often heard than seen. The vocalizations are described as powerful short whistles. During display, the males produce a series of accelerating loud whistles, or 'kri-kri-kri' calls, that slow down towards the end.

=== Diet ===
In captivity, buff-crested bustards have been fed mice, mealworms, crickets, apple, cabbage, chopped greens, bustard pellets, and game bird pellets. Their diet in the wild is inadequately studied.

=== Reproduction ===
During the mating season in spring and summer, males put on elaborate aerial displays to get selected by a female for mating. The male will fly up to 30 meters (98 ft) upwards, stall, and drop with folded wings. Before reaching the ground, it opens its wings at the last moment and lands abruptly on the ground. Except during display for mating, both males and females are reluctant flyers, preferring to creep away from danger.

A captive female buff-crested bustards has been observed carrying her newborn chicks in attempts to deliberately displace them. The hen carried one chick at a time under her wing to relocate it, then dropped it at a desired location. It is unknown whether this behaviour is common among individuals of this species.

Hens lay 1 or 2 eggs in nests situated on the ground.
