= List of freshwater ecoregions in Africa and Madagascar =

This is a list of freshwater ecoregions in Africa and Madagascar as identified by the World Wildlife Fund (WWF).

The WWF categorizes the Earth's land surface into ecoregions, which are defined as "large area[s] of land or water containing a distinct assemblage of natural communities and species." These ecoregions are further grouped into bioregions, "a complex of ecoregions that share a similar biogeographic history, and thus often have strong affinities at higher taxonomic levels (e.g. genera, families)." The Earth's land surface is divided into eight biogeographic realms. While most of Africa falls within the Afrotropical realm, the freshwater ecoregions of North Africa share similarities with the Palearctic realm.

Each ecoregion is also classified into major habitat types or biomes.

Many view this classification as decisive, and some propose using these boundaries as stable borders for bioregional democracy initiatives.

== by Bioregion ==
=== North African ===
- Canary Islands
- Horn (Djibouti, Ethiopia, Somalia)
- Permanent Maghreb (Algeria, Mauritania, Morocco, Tunisia, Western Sahara)
- Temporary Maghreb (Algeria, Egypt, Libya, Mauritania, Morocco, Tunisia, Western Sahara)
- Red Sea Coastal (Egypt, Eritrea, Ethiopia, Sudan)
- Socotra (Yemen)

=== Nilo-Sudan ===
- Ashanti (Côte d'Ivoire, Ghana)
- Bight Coastal (Benin, Ghana, Nigeria, Togo)
- Bijagos (Guinea Bissau)
- Cape Verde
- Dry Sahel (Algeria, Chad, Egypt, Libya, Mali, Mauritania, Niger, Sudan, Western Sahara)
- Eburneo (Burkina Faso, Côte d'Ivoire, Mali)
- Ethiopian Highlands (Ethiopia)
- Lake Chad Catchment (Cameroon, Central African Republic, Chad, Nigeria, Sudan)
  - Yaéré (seasonal wetland)
- Niger
  - Upper Niger (Côte d'Ivoire, Guinea, Mali)
  - Inner Niger Delta (Mali)
  - Lower Niger-Benue (Benin, Burkina Faso, Mali, Niger, Nigeria)
  - Niger Delta (Nigeria)
- Nile
  - Lake Tana (Ethiopia)
  - Upper Nile (Sudan, Uganda)
  - Lower Nile (Egypt, Sudan)
  - Nile Delta (Egypt)
- Northern Eastern Rift (Ethiopia)
- Senegal-Gambia Catchments (Gambia, Guinea, Guinea Bissau, Mali, Mauritania, Senegal)
- Shebele-Juba Catchments (Ethiopia, Kenya, Somalia)
- Lake Turkana (Ethiopia, Kenya)
- Volta (Burkina Faso, Côte d'Ivoire, Ghana, Togo)

=== Upper Guinea ===
- Fouta-Djalon (Guinea)
- Mount Nimba (Côte d'Ivoire, Guinea, Liberia)
- Northern Upper Guinea (Guinea, Guinea Bissau, Liberia, Sierra Leone)
- Southern Upper Guinea (Côte d'Ivoire, Guinea, Liberia)

=== West Coast Equatorial ===
- Central West Coastal Equatorial (Cameroon, Republic of the Congo, Equatorial Guinea, Gabon)
- Northern West Coast Equatorial (Cameroon, Equatorial Guinea, Nigeria)
- Southern West Coast Equatorial (Angola, Democratic Republic of the Congo, Republic of the Congo, Gabon)
- São Tomé, Príncipe, and Annobón (Equatorial Guinea, São Tomé and Príncipe)
- Western Equatorial Crater Lakes (Cameroon)

=== Congo ===
- Albertine Highlands (Democratic Republic of the Congo)
- Bangweulu-Mweru (Democratic Republic of the Congo, Zambia)
- Cuvette Centrale (Democratic Republic of the Congo)
- Kasai (Angola, Democratic Republic of the Congo)
- Lower Congo (Angola, Democratic Republic of the Congo, Republic of the Congo)
- Lower Congo Rapids (Democratic Republic of the Congo, Republic of the Congo)
- Mai-Ndombe (Democratic Republic of the Congo)
- Malebo Pool (Democratic Republic of the Congo)
- Sangha (Cameroon, Central African Republic, Republic of the Congo)
- Sudanic Congo (Oubangi) (Central African Republic, Democratic Republic of the Congo, Republic of the Congo)
- Uele (Democratic Republic of the Congo)
- Upper Congo (Democratic Republic of the Congo)
- Upper Congo Rapids (Democratic Republic of the Congo)
- Upper Luluaba (Democratic Republic of the Congo)
- Thysville Caves (Democratic Republic of the Congo)
- Tumba (Democratic Republic of the Congo)

=== Great Lakes ===
- Lake Malawi (Malawi, Mozambique, Tanzania)
- Lake Rukwa (Tanzania)
- Lake Tanganyika (Burundi, Democratic Republic of the Congo, Rwanda, Tanzania, Zambia)
- Lakes Kivu, Edward, George & Victoria (Burundi, Democratic Republic of the Congo, Kenya, Tanzania, Uganda)

=== Eastern and Coastal ===
- Southern Eastern Rift (Kenya, Tanzania)
- Kenyan Coastal Rivers (Kenya)
- Pangani (Kenya, Tanzania)
- Malagarasi-Moyowosi (Tanzania)
- Eastern Coastal Basins (Mozambique, Tanzania)
- Lakes Chilwa and Chiuta (Malawi, Mozambique)

=== Cuanza ===
- Cuanza (Angola)

=== Zambezi ===
- Etosha (Angola, Namibia)
- Kalahari (Botswana, Namibia, South Africa)
- Karstveld Sink Holes (Namibia)
- Namib Coastal (Angola, Namibia)
- Okavango Floodplains (Angola, Botswana, Namibia)
- Zambezian Lowveld (Mozambique, South Africa, Eswatini, Zimbabwe)
- Zambezi
  - Zambezian Headwaters (Angola, Zambia)
  - Kafue (Zambia)
  - Upper Zambezi Floodplains (Angola, Botswana, Namibia, Zambia)
  - Mulanje (Malawi, Mozambique)
  - Eastern Zimbabwe Highlands (Mozambique, Zimbabwe)
  - Zambezian (Plateau) Highveld (Zimbabwe)
  - Middle Zambezi Luangwa (Mozambique, Zambia, Zimbabwe)
  - Lower Zambezi (Malawi, Mozambique)

=== Madagascar and the Indian Ocean Islands ===
- Comoros
- Madagascar Eastern Lowlands (Madagascar)
- Madagascar Eastern Highlands (Madagascar)
- Madagascar Northwestern Basins (Madagascar)
- Madagascar Southern Basins (Madagascar)
- Madagascar Western Basins (Madagascar)
- Mascarenes (Mauritius, Réunion)
- Coralline Seychelles (Seychelles)
- Granitic Seychelles (Seychelles)

=== Southern Temperate ===
- Amatole-Winterberg Highlands (South Africa)
- Cape Fold (South Africa)
- Drakensberg-Maloti Highlands (Lesotho, South Africa)
- Karoo (South Africa)
- Southern Kalahari (South Africa)
- Southern Temperate Highveld (South Africa, Eswatini)
- Western Orange (Botswana, South Africa)

== by Major Habitat type ==
=== Closed basins and small lakes ===
- Lakes Chilwa and Chiuta
- Southern Eastern Rift
- Lake Tana
- Northern Eastern Rift
- Western Equatorial Crater Lakes

=== Floodplains, swamps, and lakes ===
- Bangweulu-Mweru
- Inner Niger Delta
- Kafue
- Lake Chad Catchment
- Mai Ndombe
- Malagarasi-Moyowosi
- Okavango Floodplains
- Tumba
- Upper Luluaba
- Upper Nile
- Upper Zambezi Floodplains
- Yaéré

=== Moist forest rivers ===
- Ashanti
- Cuvette Centrale
- Central West Coastal Equatorial
- Eburneo
- Kasai
- Lower Congo
- Madagascar Eastern Lowlands
- Malebo Pool
- Northern Upper Guinea
- Northern West Coast Equatorial
- Sangha
- Southern Upper Guinea
- Northern West Coastal Equatorial
- Sudanic Congo (Oubangi)
- Upper Congo
- Upper Niger

=== Mediterranean systems ===
- Cape Fold
- Permanent Maghreb

=== Highland and mountain systems ===
- Albertine Highlands
- Amatole-Winterberg Highlands
- Drakensberg-Maloti Highlands
- Eastern Zimbabwe Highlands
- Ethiopian Highlands
- Fouta-Djalon
- Madagascar Eastern Highlands
- Mount Nimba
- Mulanje

=== Island rivers and lakes ===
- Bijagos
- Canary Islands
- Cape Verde
- Comoros
- Coralline Seychelles
- Granitic Seychelles
- São Tomé, Príncipe, and Annobón
- Mascarenes
- Socotra

=== Large lakes ===
- Lake Malawi
- Lake Rukwa
- Lake Tanganyika
- Lake Turkana
- Lakes Kivu, Edward, George & Victoria

=== Large river deltas ===
- Niger Delta
- Nile Delta

=== Large river rapids ===
- Lower Congo Rapids
- Upper Congo Rapids

=== Savanna-dry forest rivers ===
- Bight Coastal
- Cuanza
- Kenyan Coastal Rivers
- Lower Niger-Benue
- Lower Zambezi
- Madagascar Northwestern Basins
- Madagascar Western Basins
- Middle Zambezi Luangwa
- Pangani
- Senegal-Gambia Catchments
- Eastern Coastal Basins
- Southern Temperate Highveld
- Uele
- Volta
- Zambezian Headwaters
- Zambezian Lowveld
- Zamebzian (Plateau) Highveld

=== Subterranean and spring systems ===
- Karstveld Sink Holes
- Thysville Caves

=== Xeric systems ===
- Dry Sahel
- Etosha
- Horn
- Kalahari
- Karoo
- Lower Nile
- Madagascar Southern Basins
- Namib Coastal
- Red Sea Coastal
- Shebele-Juba Catchments
- Southern Kalahari
- Temporary Maghreb
- Western Orange
