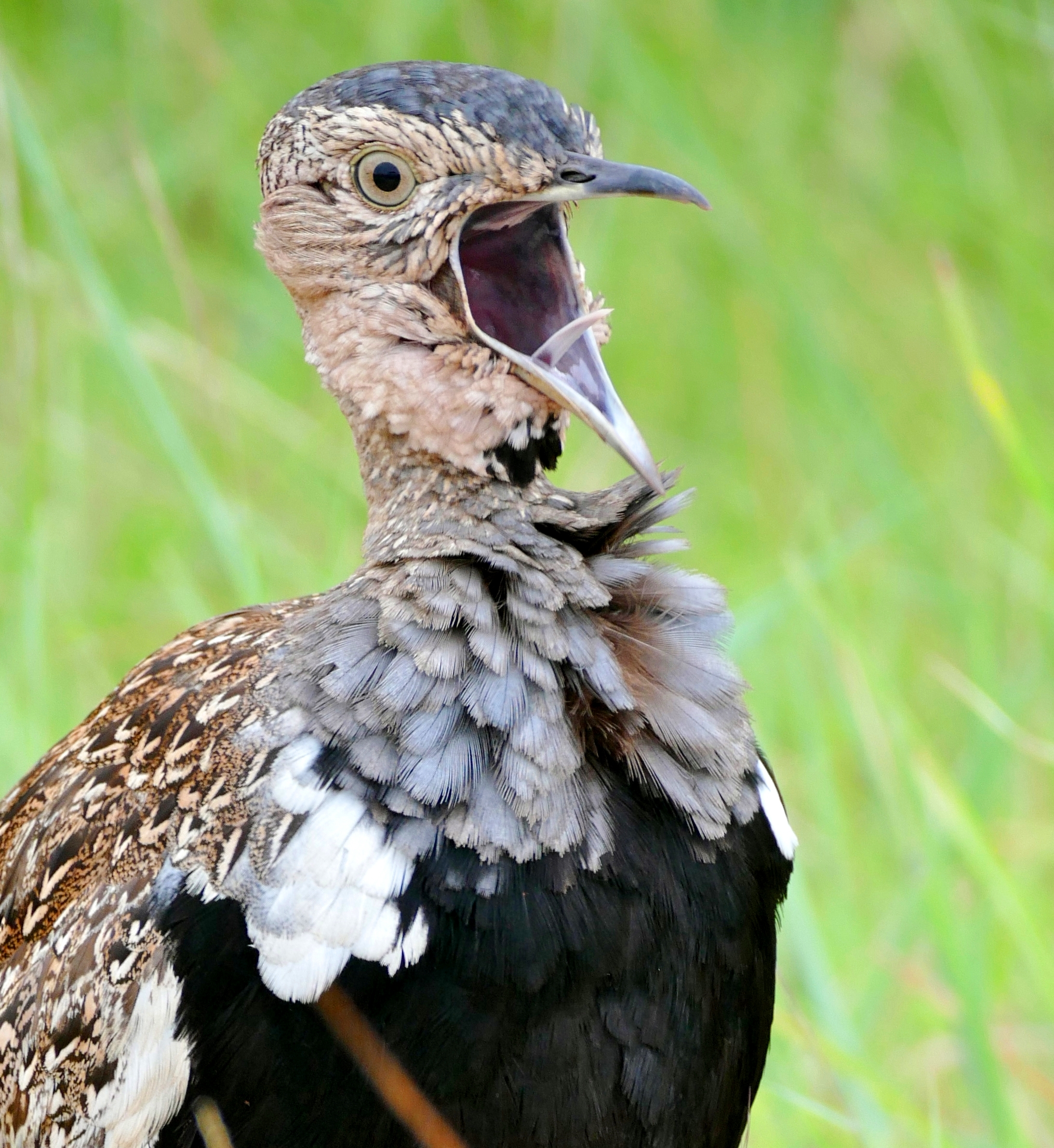
- Red-crested korhaan (L. ruficrista), male calling in display, South Africa

Scientific classification
- Kingdom: Animalia
- Phylum: Chordata
- Class: Aves
- Order: Otidiformes
- Family: Otididae
- Genus: Lophotis; Reichenbach, 1848

Type species
- Otis ruficrista A. Smith, 1836

Species
- see text
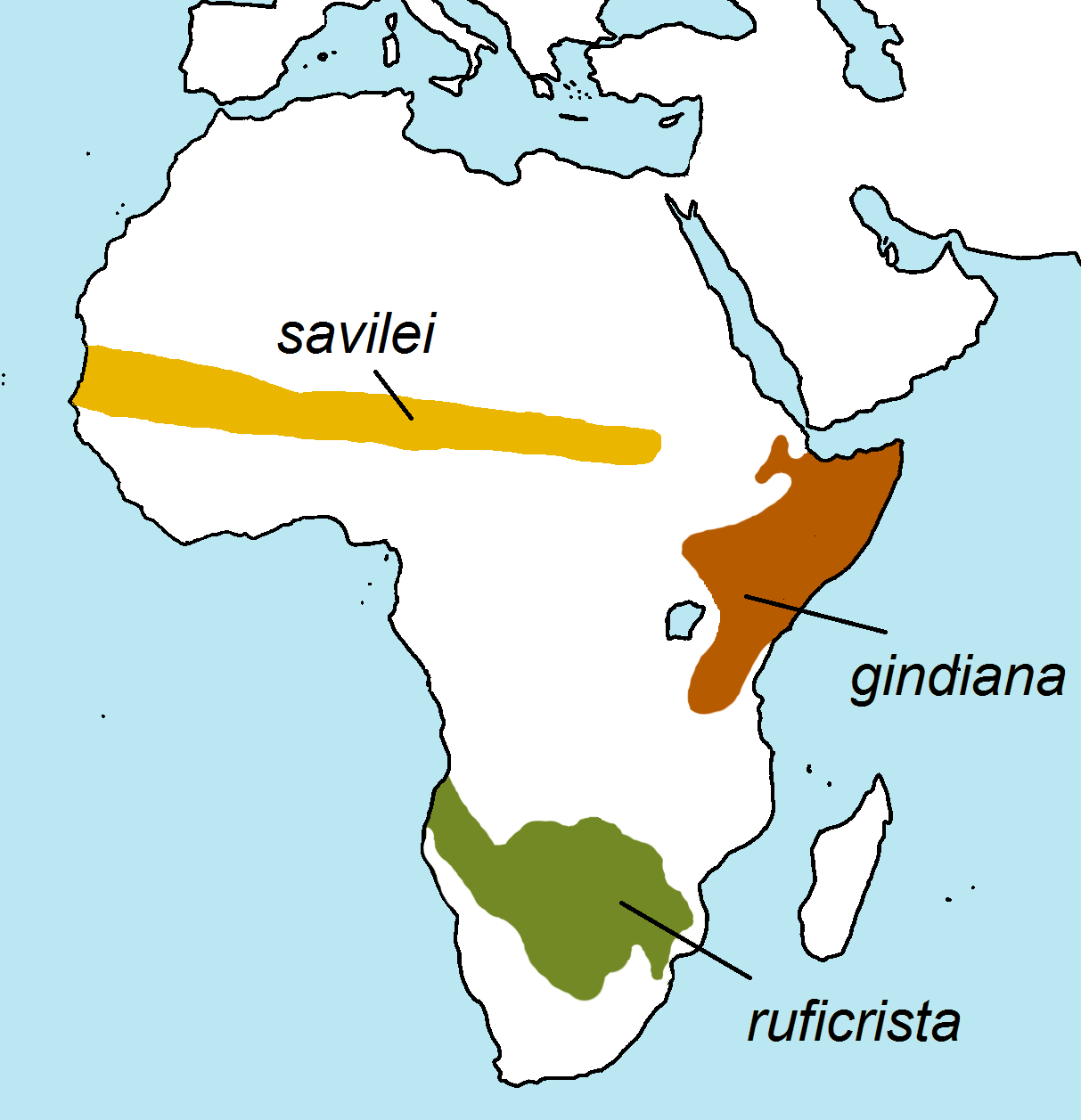
- Lophotis savilei Lophotis gindiana Lophotis ruficrista

= Lophotis =

Genus of birds

Lophotis is a genus of bustard in the family Otididae. The genus contains three species, all found in Africa. All three species are sometimes placed in the genus Eupodotis, and are closely related to that genus and the genus Afrotis. One distinctive feature of the genus is a pink retractile crest.

== Species ==
Image	Scientific name	Common name	Distribution
	Lophotis savilei	Savile's bustard	Burkina Faso, Cameroon, Chad, Ivory Coast, Gambia, Mali, Mauritania, Niger, Nigeria, Senegal, and Sudan.
	Lophotis gindiana	Buff-crested bustard	Djibouti, Ethiopia, Kenya, Somalia, South Sudan, Tanzania, and Uganda.
	Lophotis ruficrista	Red-crested korhaan	Angola, Botswana, Mozambique, Namibia, South Africa, Swaziland, Zambia, and Zimbabwe.
