= Waza Logone floodplain =

Floodplain in Cameroon

Coordinates: 11.6000°N 14.7333°E

Designations

Ramsar Wetland
- Designated: 20 March 2006
- Reference no.: 1609

Waza Logone floodplain is a semi-arid ecosystem in northern Cameroon. Covering 6,000 km^{2} (2,300 sq mi), the floodplain is located in the Far North Region. Nigeria is to the west while Chad is to the east. The area was designated a "Wetland of International Importance" under the Ramsar Convention on March 20, 2006.

== See also ==
- Waza National Park
