= Tourism in Cameroon =

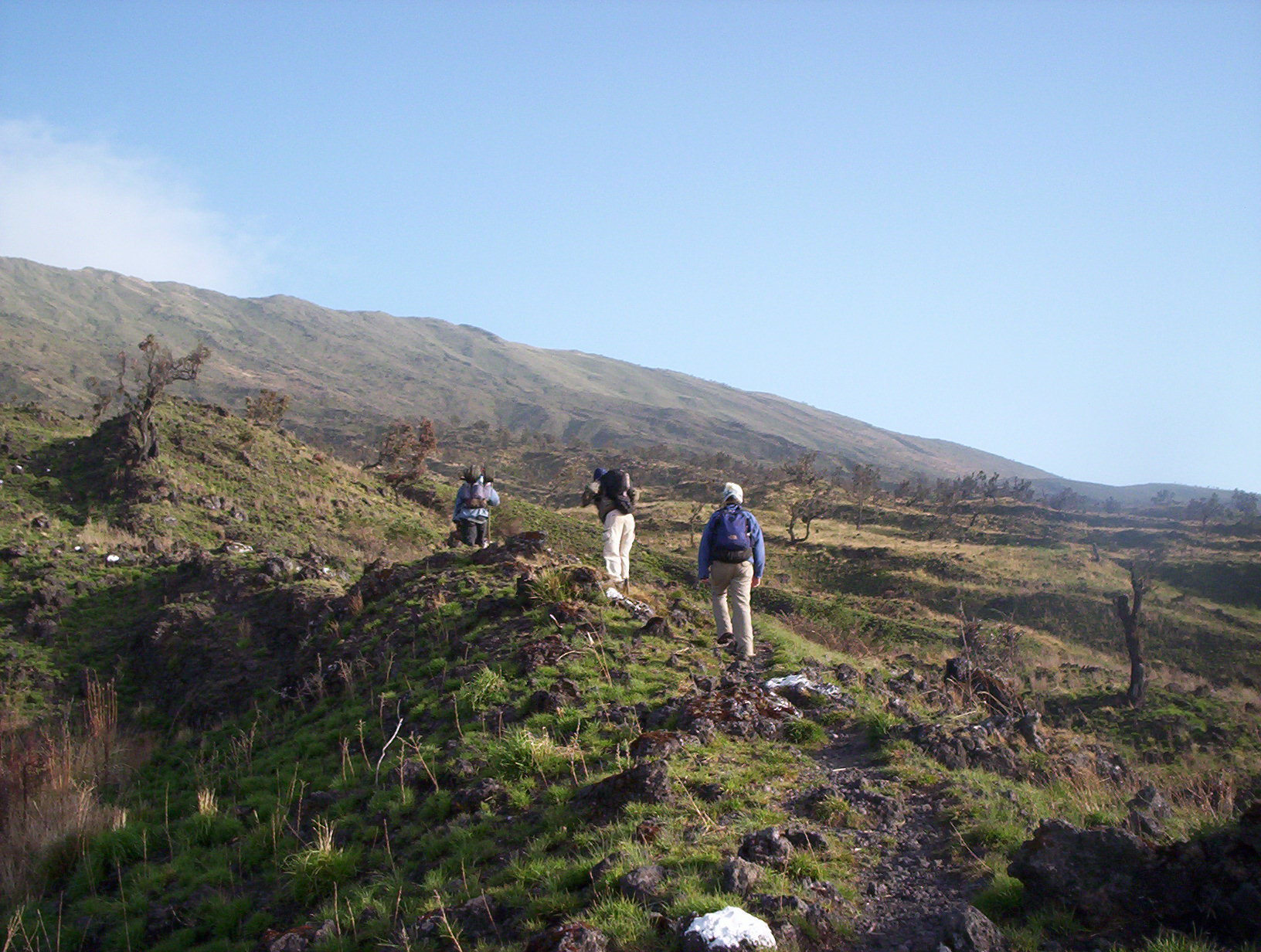
Tourists climbing Mount Cameroon, Southwest Province.

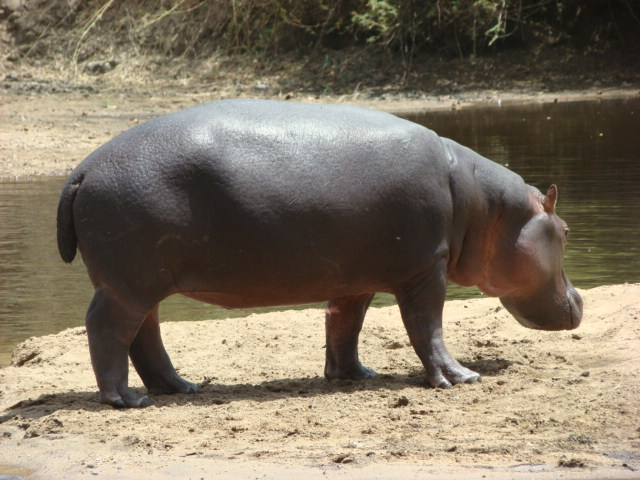
Hippopotamus at the Benoue National Park

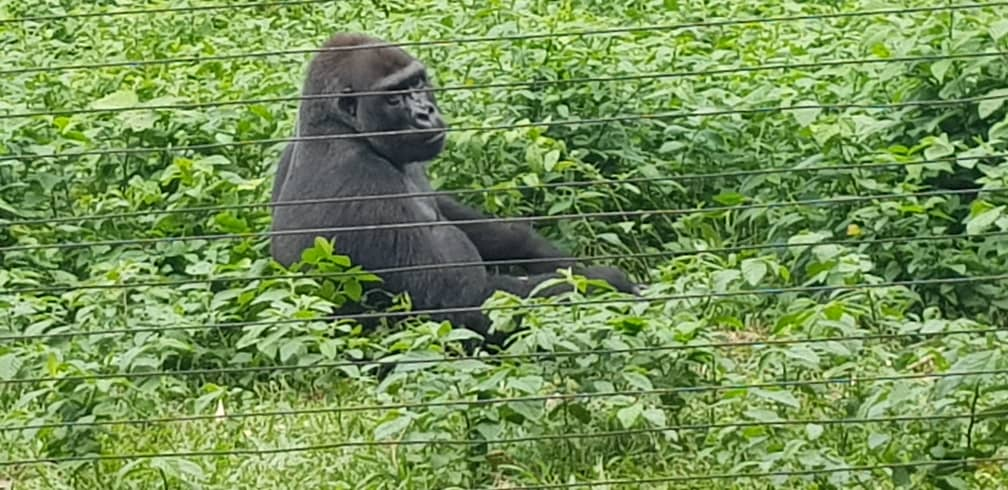
Gorilla at Mefou primate sanctuary

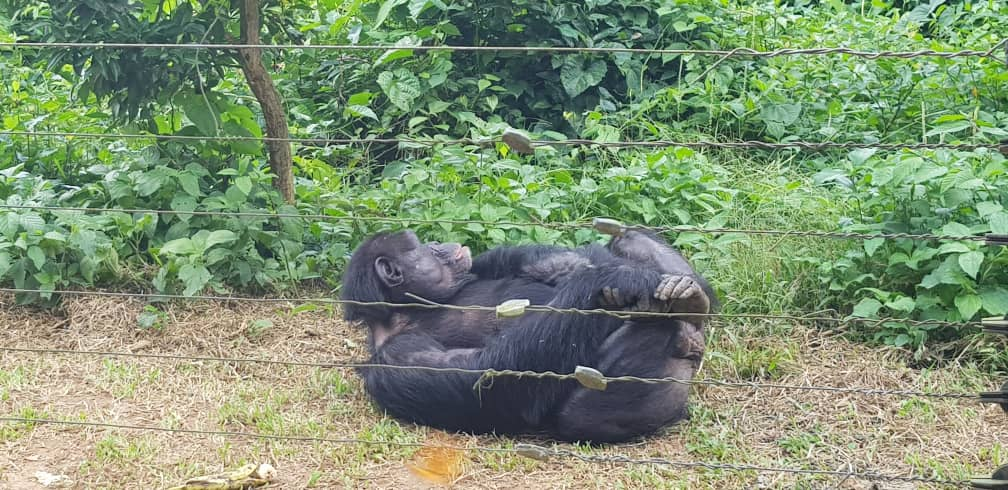
Chimpanzee at Mefou primate sanctuary

Tourism in Cameroon is a growing but relatively minor industry. Since the 1970s, the government of Cameroon has cultivated the industry by creating a ministry of tourism and by encouraging investment by airlines, hotels, and travel agencies. The government describes the country as "Africa in miniature", promoting its diversity of climate, culture, and geography. Cameroon's wildlife draws both safari-goers and big-game hunters, as Cameroon is home to many of Africa's iconic animals: cheetahs, chimpanzees, elephants, giraffes, gorillas, hippopotami, and rhinoceroses. Impediments to further growth of the tourism sector include poor transport infrastructure and corrupt officials who may harass visitors for bribes.

== Development ==
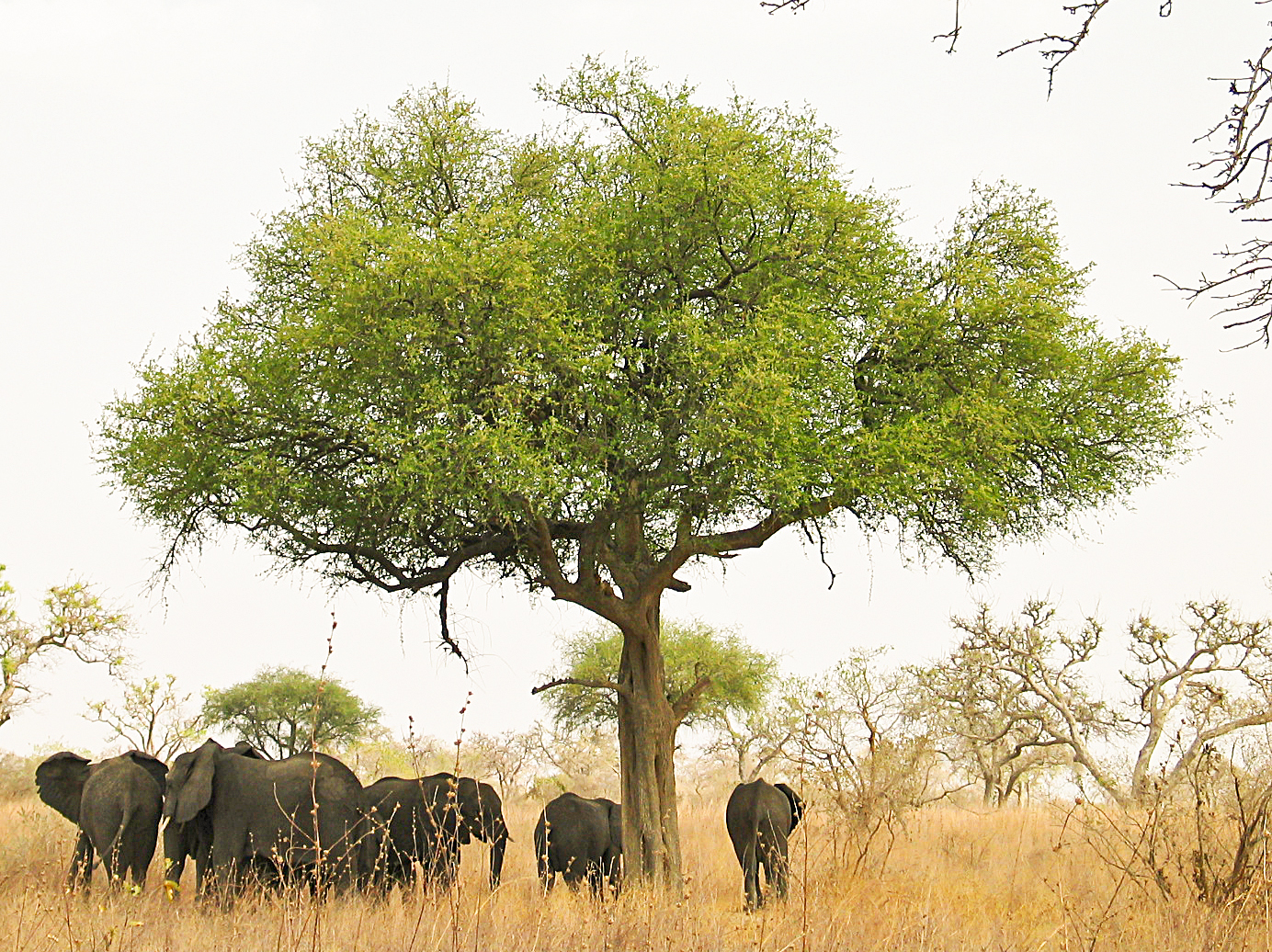
Herd of elephants in Waza National Park in the Far North Province.

Government programmes to increase tourism in Cameroon began on 3 December 1974 when President Ahmadou Ahidjo issued an order that set the tourism industry aside as having special status and established the General Commissariat of Tourism. On 28 June 1975, Ahidjo reconstituted the body as the General Delegation for Tourism, whose purpose was to encourage private investment by airlines, hotels, and travel agencies. The delegation publishes tourist literature and publicises Cameroon through advertising. Ahidjo and his successor, Paul Biya, have set aside several game and forest reserves as further touristic draws. Improving air, rail, and road transportation to popular tourist sites has been another priority.

Tourism infrastructure in Cameroon has steadily improved. The country offered 37 hotels with 599 rooms in 1960. This had risen to 203 hotels with 3,229 rooms in 1976. In 1980, the country offered 7,500 hotel rooms. Nevertheless, the vast majority of these rooms are in two major cities, Douala and Yaoundé. In 1971, 29,500 tourists visited Cameroon. This number had risen to 100,000 tourists in 1975, and 130,000 in 1980. Most visitors to the country come from France, the United Kingdom, and Canada. Business travellers make up one of the largest segments of Cameroon's tourists. The industry has made significant strides since the 1990s. Cameroon is primarily French-speaking, but two provinces, the Northwest and the Southwest provinces, are English-speaking.

== Barriers ==
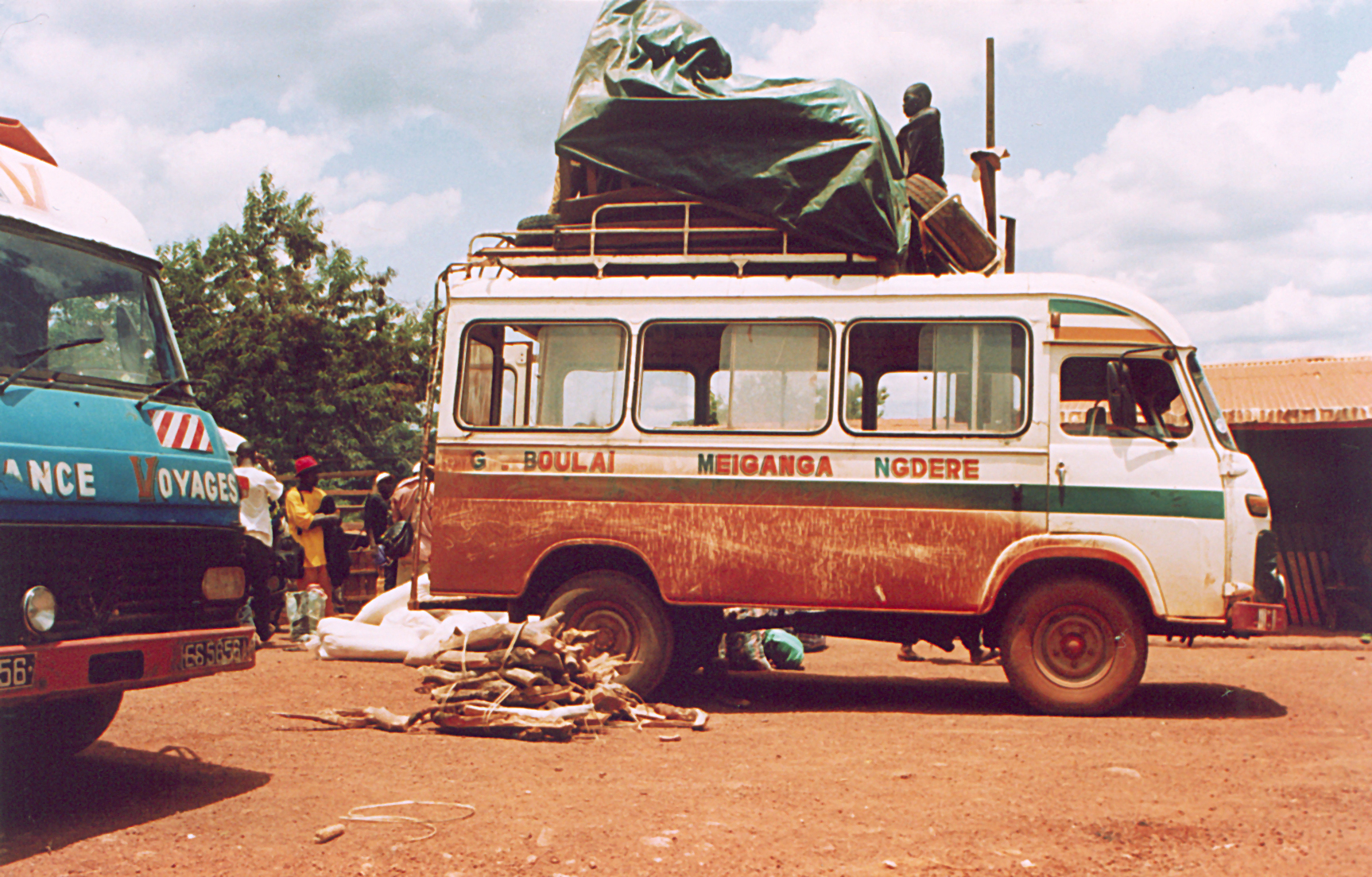
Bush taxi being loaded in Batouri, East Province

Tourists face several obstacles in Cameroon. Photography is difficult, since Cameroonians often resent foreigners taking photographs of things that outsiders may consider strange or that may cast Cameroon in a negative light. The government forbids all photography of government buildings and personnel, airports, bridges, and markets.

Treatment of tourists by Cameroonian officials has improved as the role of tourism as a source of revenue has been emphasised by the government. Tourists once faced long, thorough searches upon arrival in the country, but these have become rare. Still, police or gendarmes sometimes accuse foreign tourists of spying or carrying out mercenary activities. This is especially true for tourists who visit sites off the main tourist routes or who opt for cheap accommodation or public transport (e.g., mini-buses) over fancier hotels and rental cars. Police and gendarmes at roadblocks may harass foreign visitors for bribes.

== Tourist sites ==
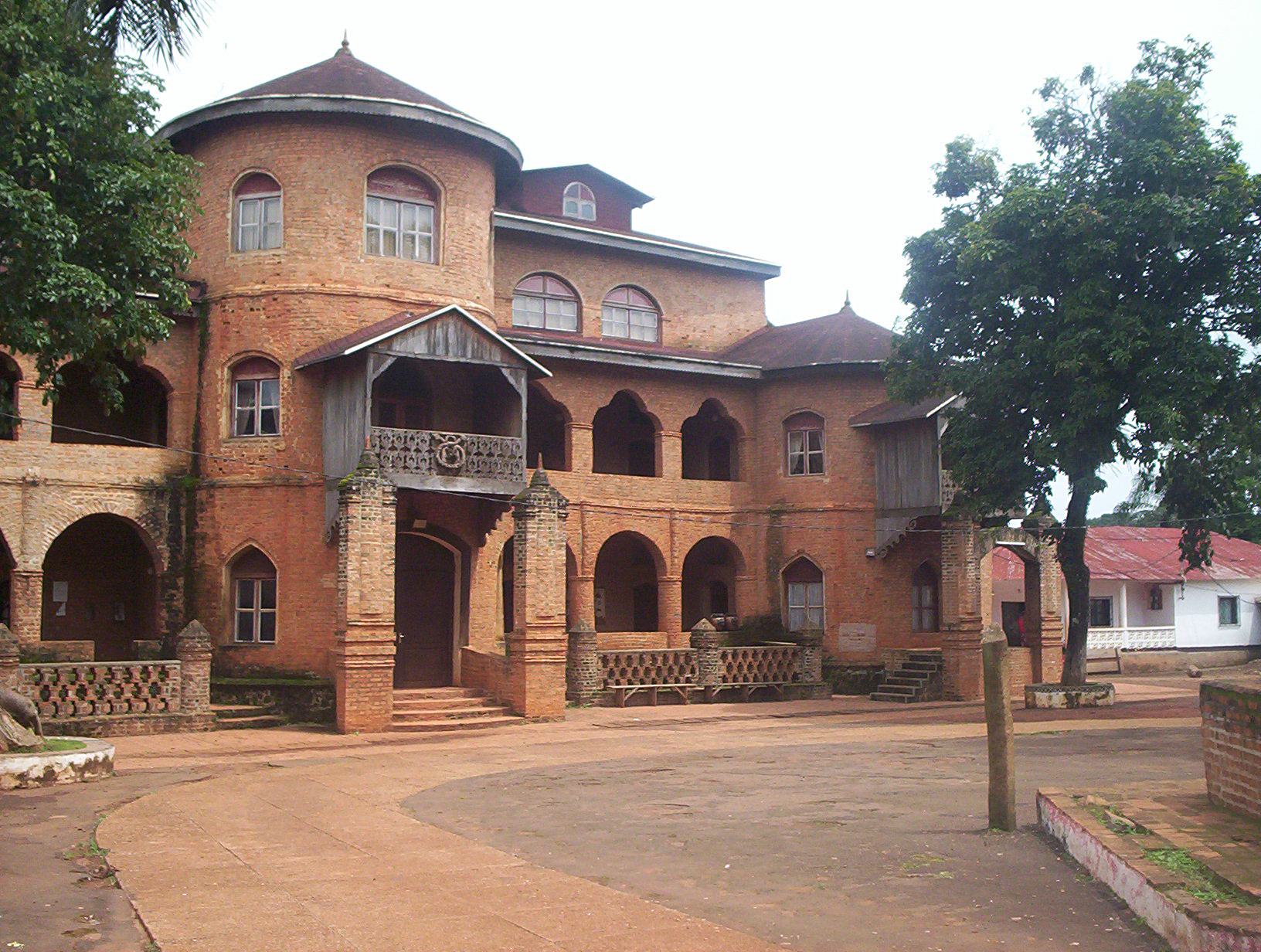
Palace of the sultan of the Bamum people in Foumban, West Province

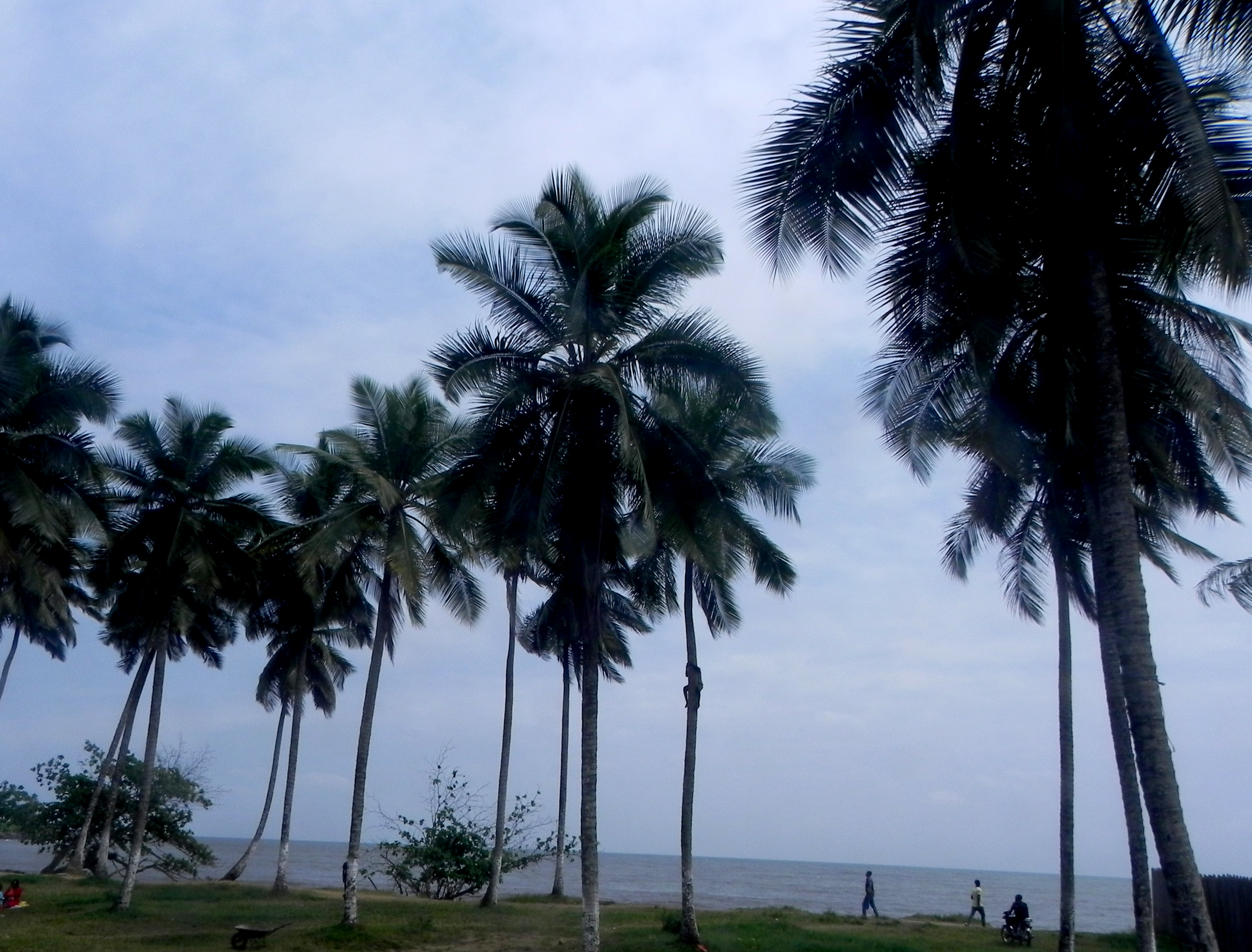
Kribi Beach

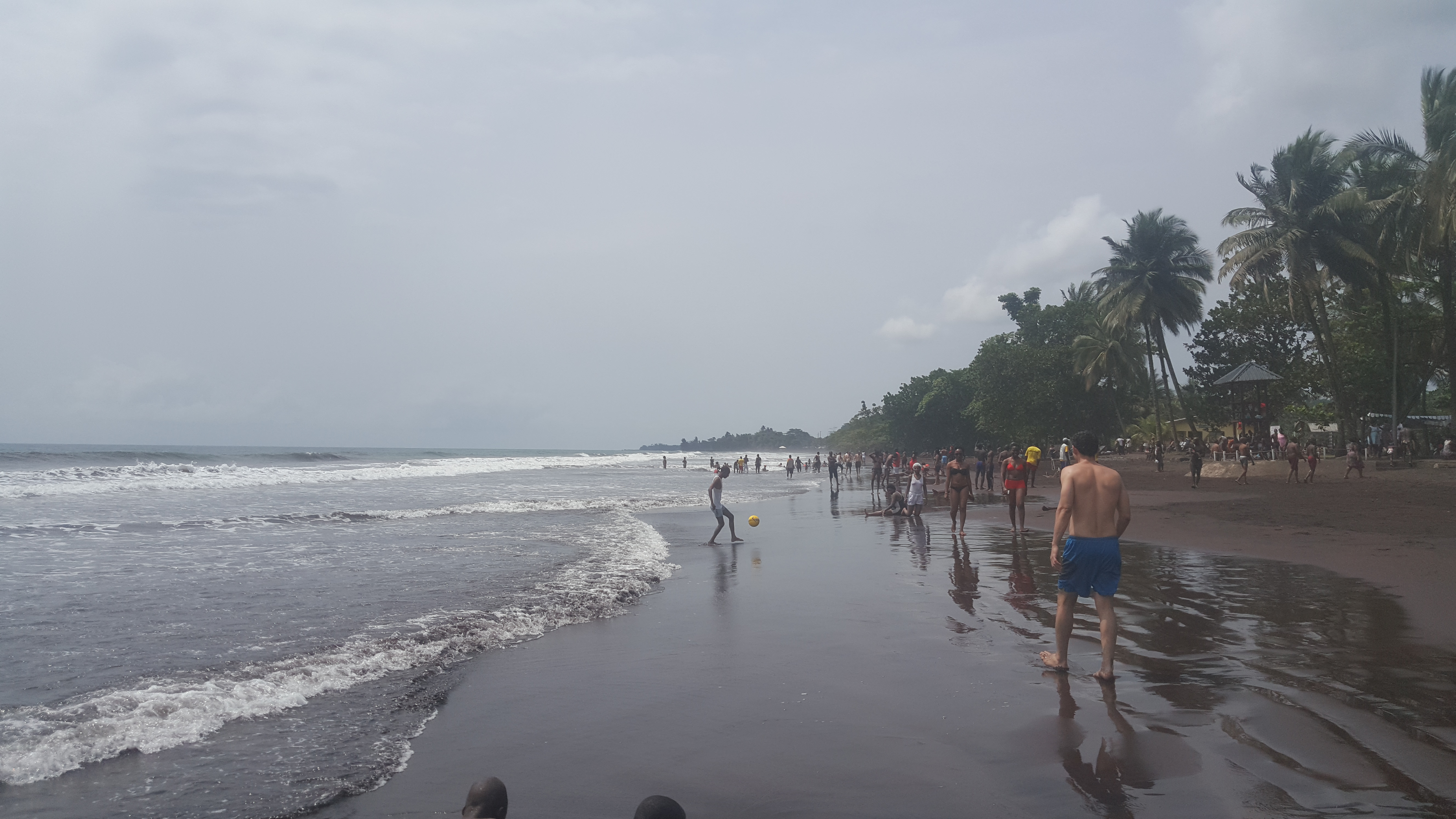
Limbe Beach with people engaging in various activities

The Cameroonian government promotes the country as "Africa in miniature", asserting that the country offers all the diversity of Africa—in climate, culture, and geography—within its borders. Other touristic phrases sometimes used include "the melting pot of Africa" and "Africa in microcosm". Cameroon's tourist destinations are in four general areas: the coast, the major cities, the Western highlands, and the north. The coast offers two major beach resort towns: Limbe is English-speaking with black, volcanic sand; and Kribi is a French-speaking city with white-sand beaches. Mount Cameroon on the coast is the highest mountain in Central and West Africa and draws hikers and climbers. The stepping-off point for climbing Mt. Cameroon is the city of Buea, where guides can be hired and equipment can be rented. There are several tin-roofed huts for hikers to sleep in during their trek up the mountain.

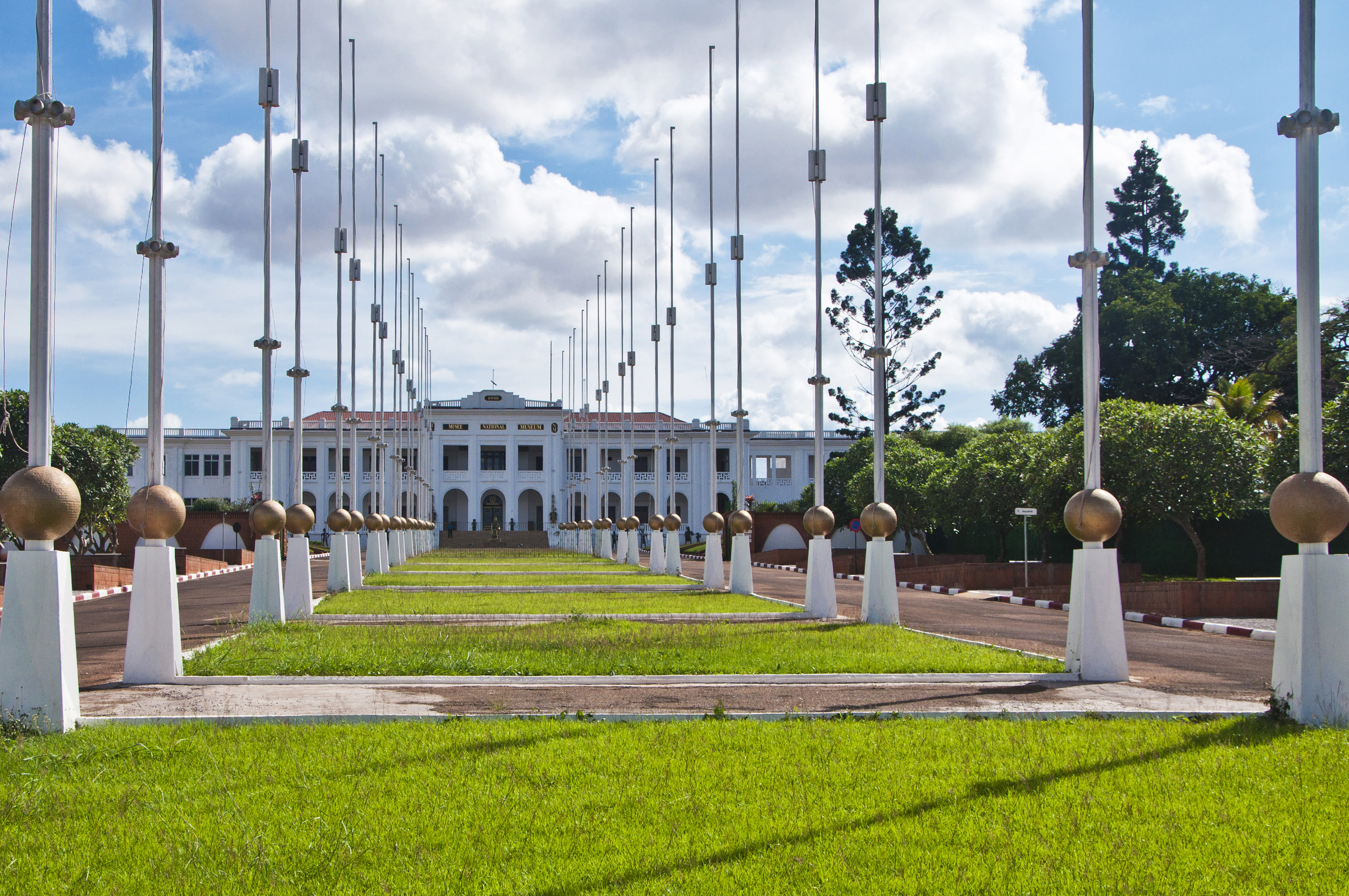
National Museum, Yaounde

Yaoundé is home to most of Cameroon's national monuments. It also has several museums. The Western highlands offer picturesque mountain scenery, waterfalls and lakes, and the altitude provides a cooler climate. Bamenda is the main city in the western highlands, and is the capital of the Northwest province. This area is known for its traditional culture and crafts. The city of Bafoussam is especially famous for its wood-carving culture and artifacts. In fact, the area produces more crafts than any other in Cameroon. The West is also home to traditional chiefdoms and fondoms, such as the sultanate of Foumban. Each chief typically has his own palace or compound which visitors may visit for a fee.

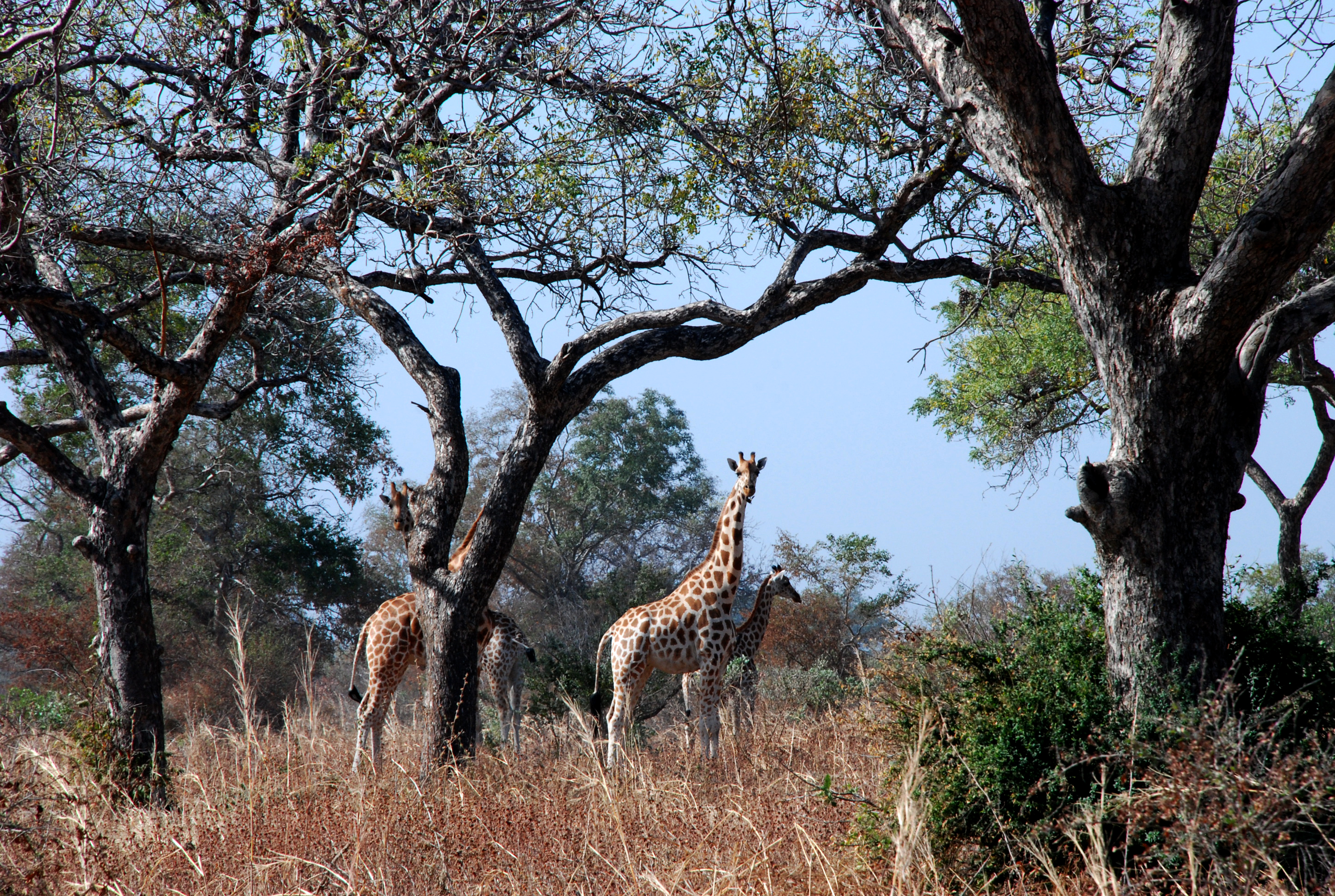
Giraffes in Waza National Park

Cameroon's north is the nation's primary tourist draw. The area has several wildlife reserves, including the largest and best-run in West Africa, Waza National Park. These parks offer both animal viewing and big-game hunting. Animals in this region include cheetahs, elephants, giraffes, hippopotami, and rhinoceroses. Maroua offers a large crafts market and museums.

The Adamawa, East, and South provinces offer a new front for expansion of the tourist industry, but poor transport conditions keep the industry small in these regions. Forest reserves in the south have little tourist-oriented infrastructure, but visitors there may see chimpanzees, elephants, gorillas, and other rainforest fauna.
