= Yaéré =

Savanna plain in Africa

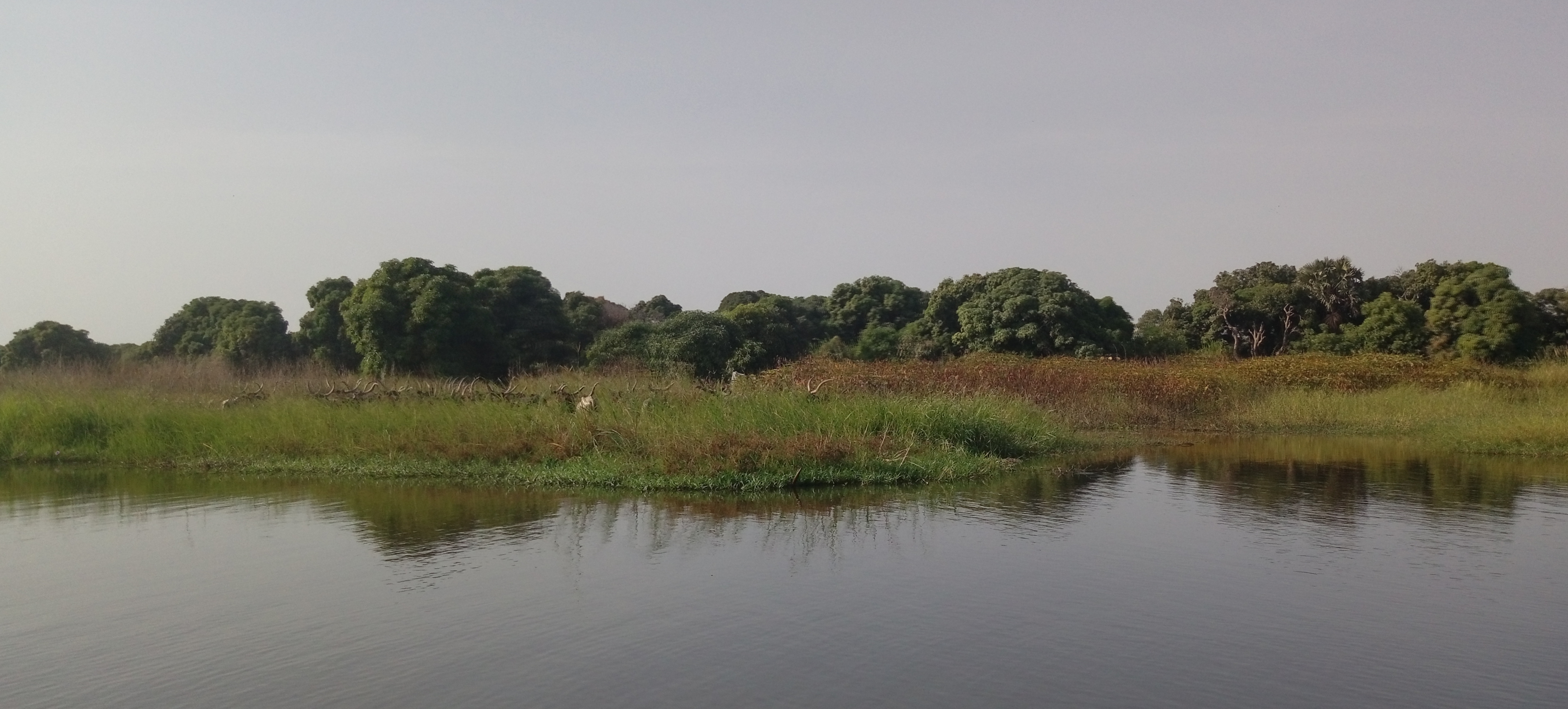
An evergreen lake chad shore (detilt)

The Yaéré, from Fula yaayre, is the name of a vast annually-flooded grassland and savanna, part of the extensive floodplains around the shallow and variable Lake Chad in Central Africa. The Yaéré is part of the Lake Chad flooded savanna ecoregion.

== Geography ==
The Yaéré covers areas of northeasternmost Nigeria, of Niger, of southern Chad and of the Far North Region of Cameroon. The Yaéré extends from the low hills at the base of the Mandara Mountains in the southwest to Lake Chad in the north. In the east it merges with the permanent wetlands bordering the Logone. At the beginning of the wet season the clays that compose the soil expand and form an impermeable pan over which the water collects.

It is connected to the more permanent wetlands along the Logone River, which flows into the endorheic Lake Chad and seasonally overflows into the surrounding Yaéré savanna. Torrential seasonal rains also drain from the Mandara Mountains, bringing a rich sediment to the floodplain. The ecological richness of the Yaéré derives from its particular conditions of wet-season flooding and dry season drought.

== Conservation ==
Drought years when rains fail, such as in the 1970s, are particularly harsh on this delicately balanced ecosystem, and on the local human population that depends on seasonal fishing.

Waza National Park of Cameroon lies in the southwest part of the Yaéré savanna.

== See also ==
- Lake Chad topics
- Freshwater ecoregions of Africa
