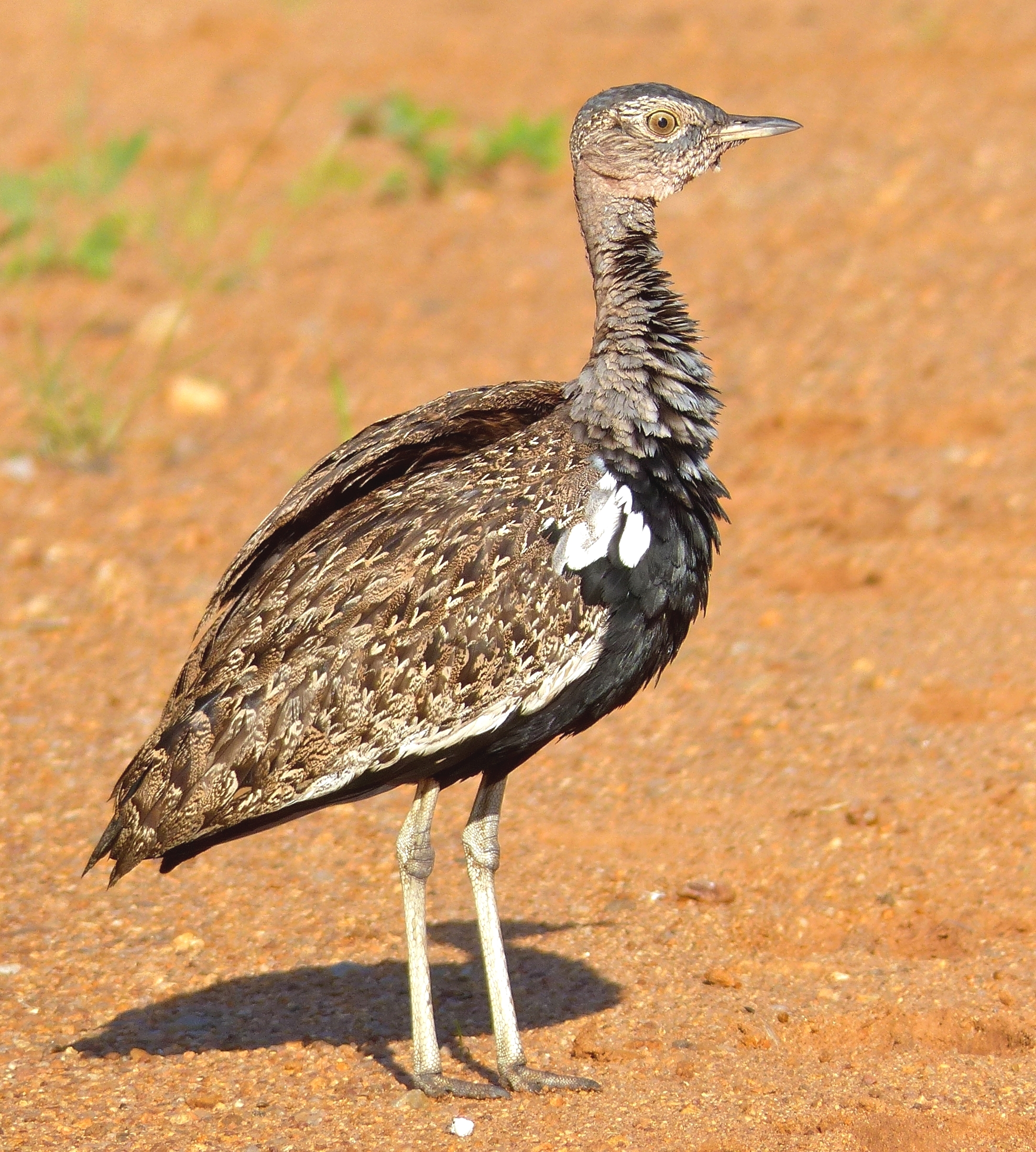

Conservation status
- Least Concern (IUCN 3.1)
- CITES Appendix II

Scientific classification
- Kingdom: Animalia
- Phylum: Chordata
- Class: Aves
- Order: Otidiformes
- Family: Otididae
- Genus: Lophotis
- Species: L. ruficrista

Binomial name
- Lophotis ruficrista (Smith, 1836)
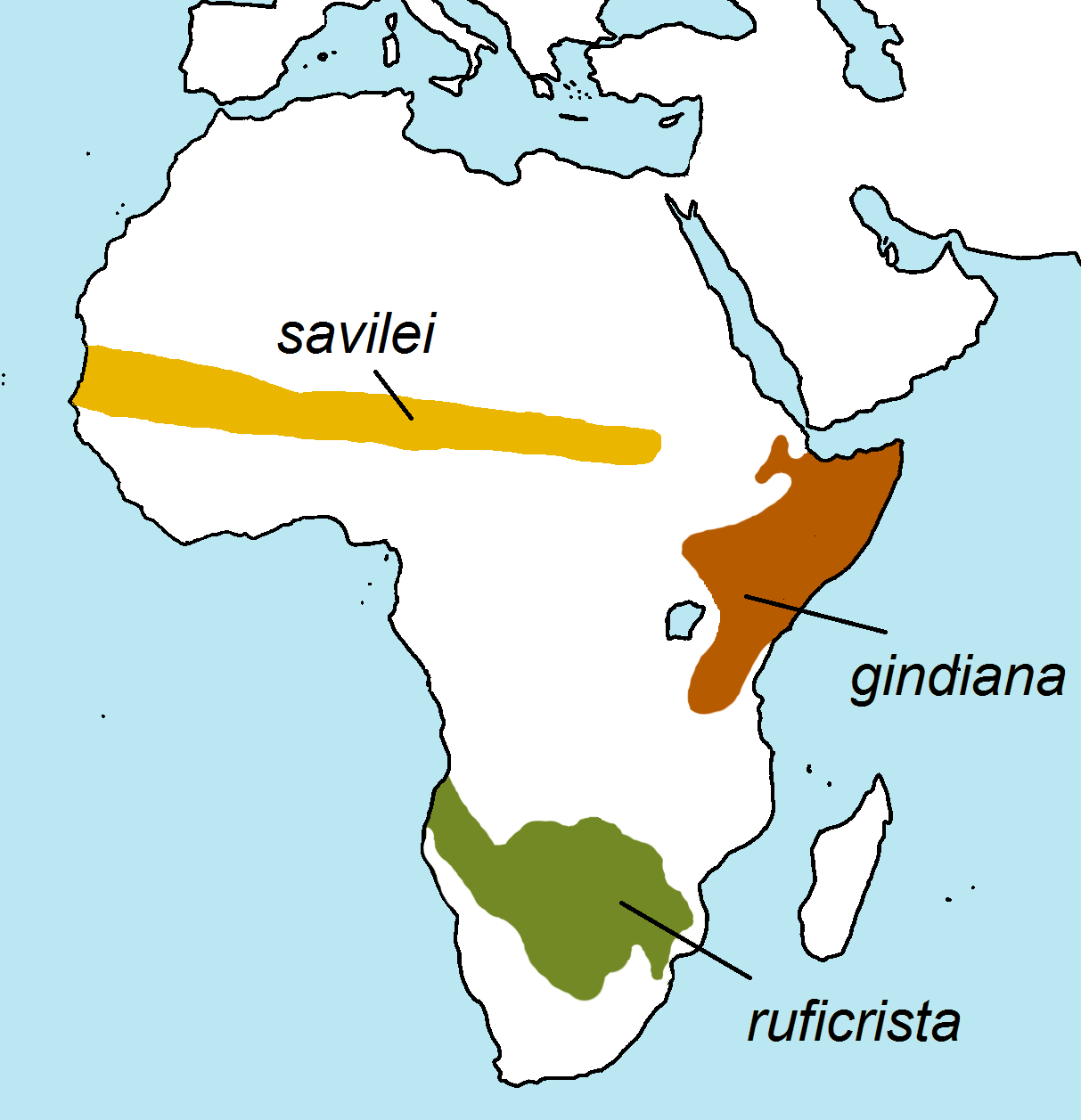
- Range of Lophotis ruficrista

= Red-crested korhaan =

Species of bird

The red-crested korhaan or red-crested bustard (Lophotis ruficrista) is a species of bird in the family Otididae. It is found in Angola, Botswana, Eswatini, Mozambique, Namibia, South Africa, Zambia, and Zimbabwe.

== Description ==
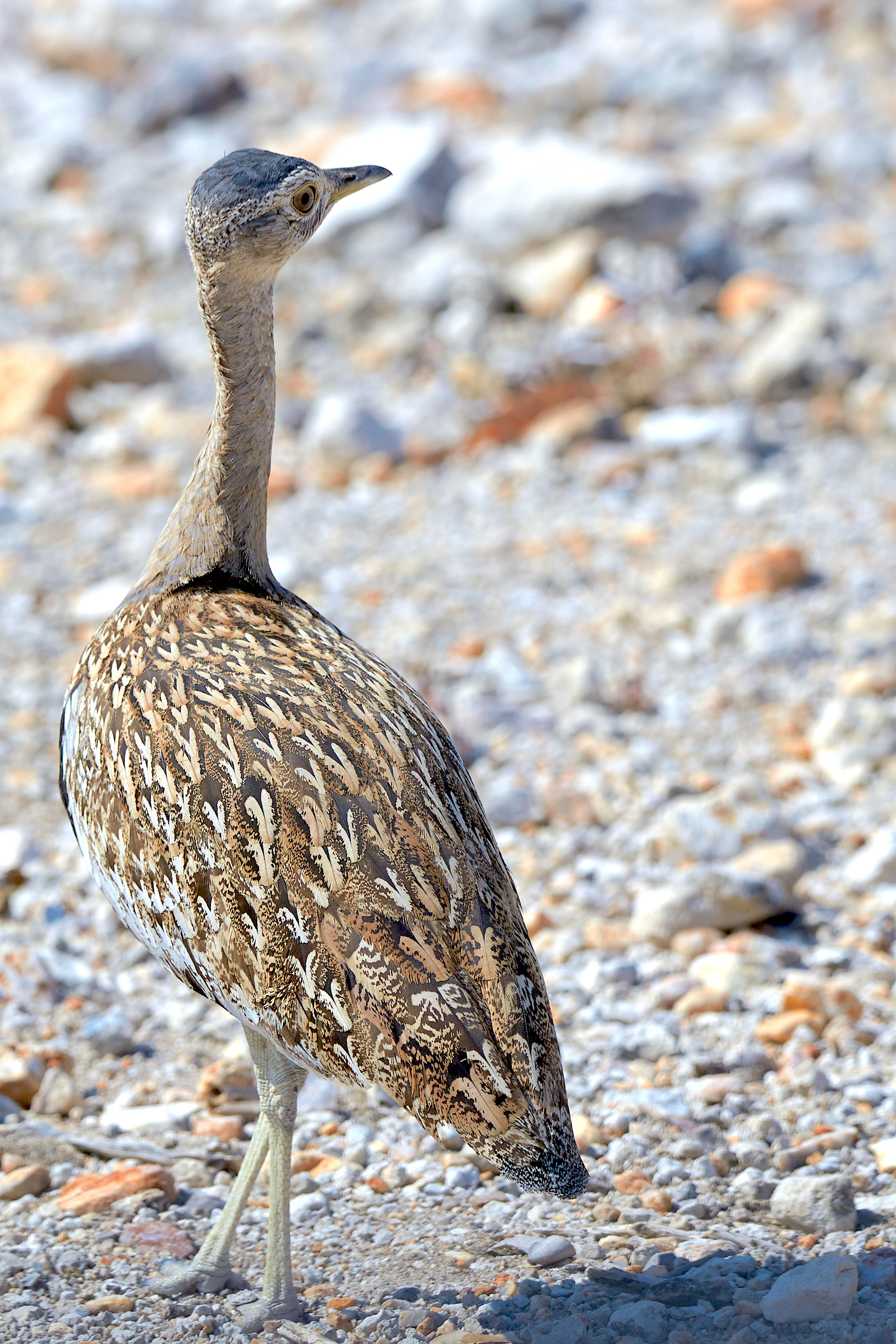
Male red-crested korhaan in Etosha National Park, Namibia

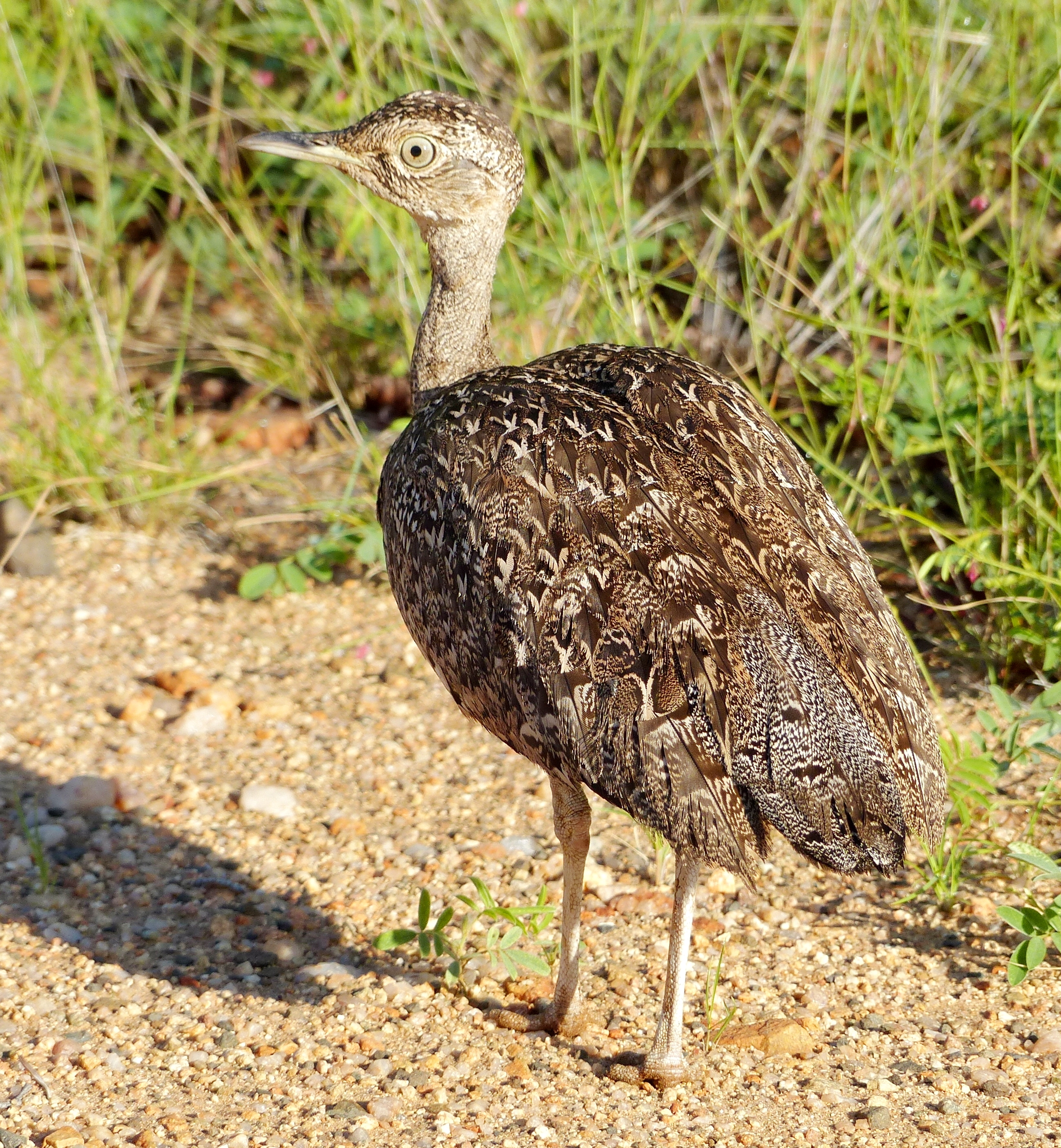
Female red-crested korhaan

The red-crested korhaan grows up to 50 cm (1.6 ft) in length with a maximal weight of 680 g (1.5 lb). The feathering of the wings folded on the back is marked by V-formed patterns of a light cream color with some white at the sides. Breast feathers are black. Legs are pale yellow and feet gray.

== Taxonomy ==
One syntype specimen of Otis ruficrista Smith (Rep. Exped. Centr. Afr., 1836, p.56.) is held in the collections of National Museums Liverpool at World Museum, with accession number D56 (male adult). The specimen was collected in the "Country between Latakoo and the Tropic of Capricorn", South Africa by Andrew Smith. The specimen was purchased at the sale of Smith's South Africa Museum (Lot 89, 6 June 1838) and came to the Liverpool national collection via the 13th Earl of Derby's collection which was bequeathed to the people of Liverpool in 1851. There is a further syntype specimen in the bird collection at the Natural History Museum at Tring.

== Sexual dimorphism ==
The male has gray-blue head feathering with an area of reddish feathers on the nape. When males attract females, the feathers of their vertex rise to form a crest and those of the throat and neck swell. The females and the immatures have brown rather than gray head feathers.

== Habitat ==
The red-crested korhaan inhabits diverse environments: dry savanna, bushveld, thorny scrubland, but sometimes also wet woodland. It is a sedentary rather than migratory bird.

== Call ==
The red-crested korhaan has a very distinct call. See The call of the red-crested korhaan.

== Reproduction ==
The male attracts females by flying high into the air and dropping down. This behavior has given the red-crested korhaan the nickname suicide bird. Females choose the male who gets closest to the ground without injury. Nests are placed on the ground sheltered by grass or bush. The brood comprises two eggs coloured from olive-brown to pink-beige with dark brown spots. Chicks leave the nest within a few days of hatching to follow the mother. Emancipation occurs after four to five weeks of breeding, but the young remain with their mother for several more months.

== Literature ==
- Josep del Hoyo, Andrew Elliot, Jordi Sargatal: Handbook of the Birds of the World. Band 3: Hoatzin to Auks. Lynx Edicions, Barcelona 1996, ISBN 8487334202.
