= Thysville Caves =

Cave complex near Mbanza-Ngungu in the DRC

The Thysville Caves are a cave complex in the Democratic Republic of the Congo, located near the town of Mbanza-Ngungu (formerly Thysville). The cave complex is fed by tributaries of the Lower Congo River, and extends across an area of 750 square kilometers.

Flowing water carries nutrients from the surface into the caves, which nourishes aquatic life adapted to the lightless environment. The caves are home to an endemic blind cyprinid fish, Caecobarbus geertsii, listed as vulnerable in the IUCN Red List. The caves are relatively unknown scientifically, and may be home to other endemic fish and invertebrate species.
