= Maga Dam =

Dam in Cameroon

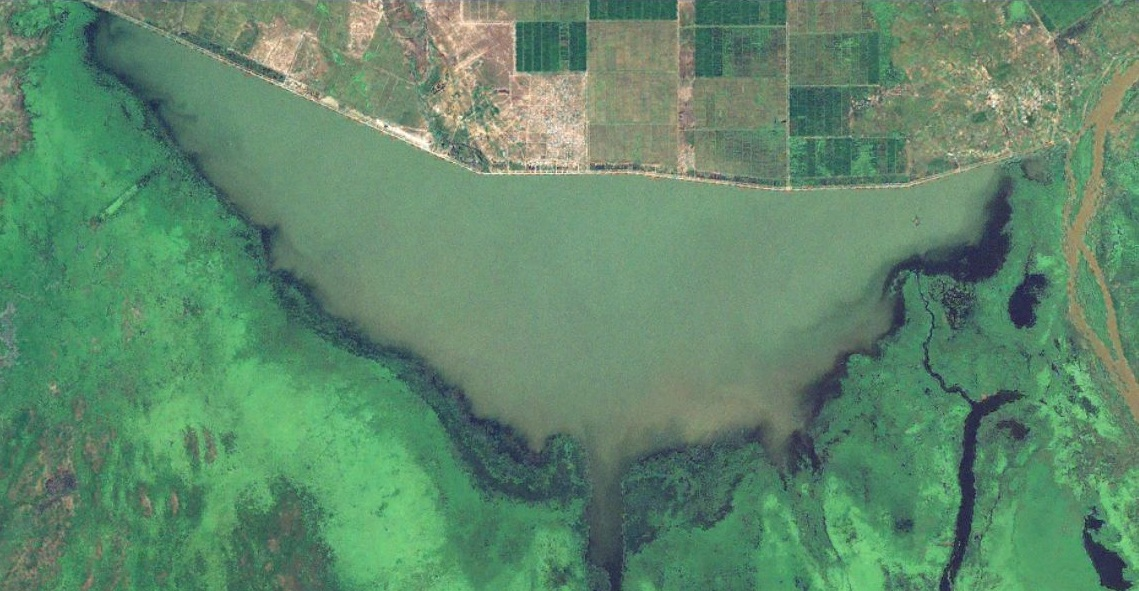
- The Maga dam

- Location within Cameroon
- Coordinates: 10.8277°N 15.0655°E
- Opening date: 1979

Maga Dam is a dam located south of Lake Chad in Cameroon, near the border with Chad.

== History ==
It was constructed in 1979. In 1994 a pilot program was started to drain some water back into the floodplain. The outcome of the dam diverting vast amounts of water has negatively impacted communities downstream. Maga Dam is the subject of ongoing environmental studies which implicate the diversion of water, which served as natural inflow to downstream regions, as the primary cause of Lake Chad shrinkage.
