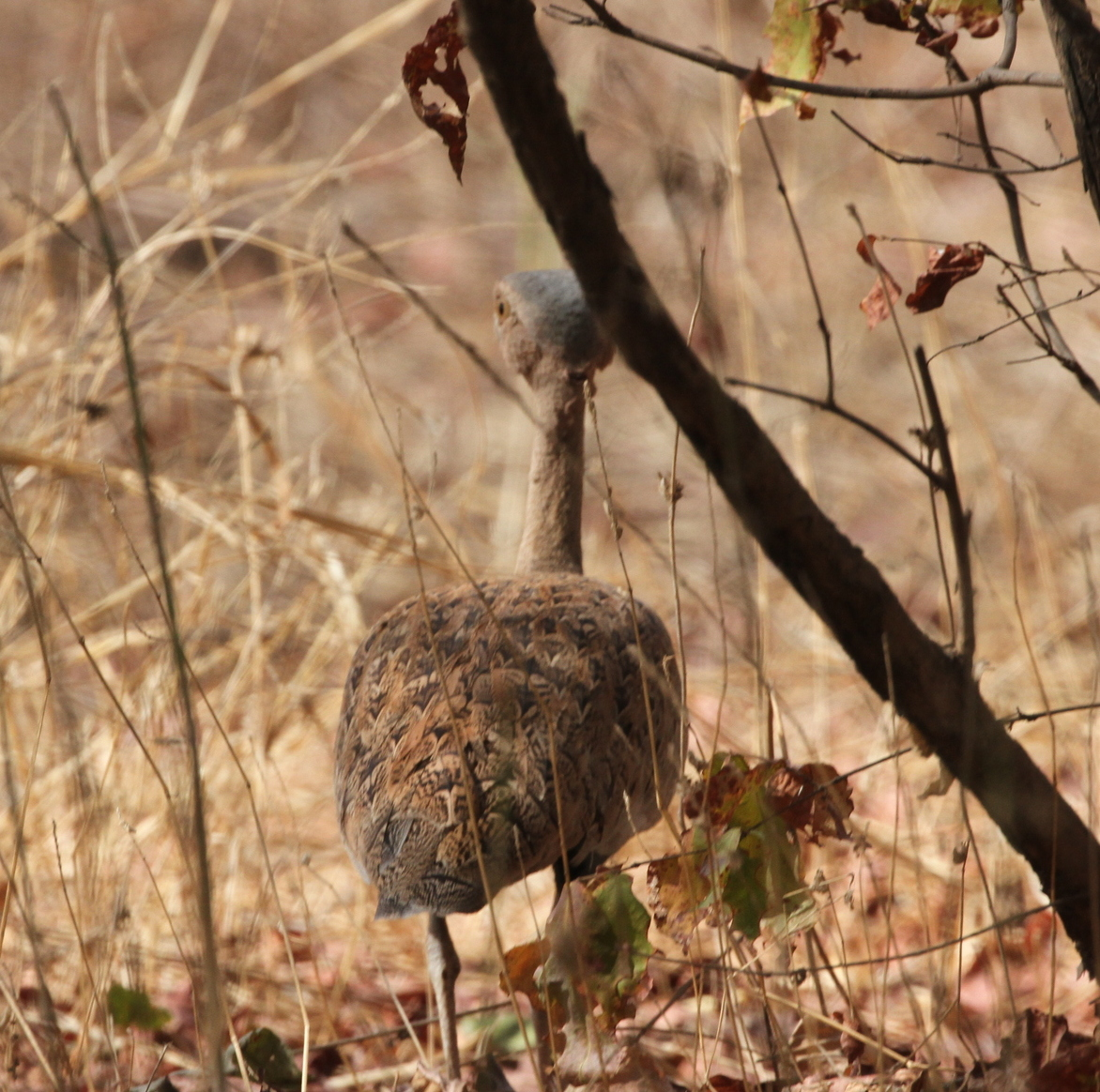

Conservation status
- Least Concern (IUCN 3.1)
- CITES Appendix II

Scientific classification
- Kingdom: Animalia
- Phylum: Chordata
- Class: Aves
- Order: Otidiformes
- Family: Otididae
- Genus: Lophotis
- Species: L. savilei

Binomial name
- Lophotis savilei Lynes, 1920
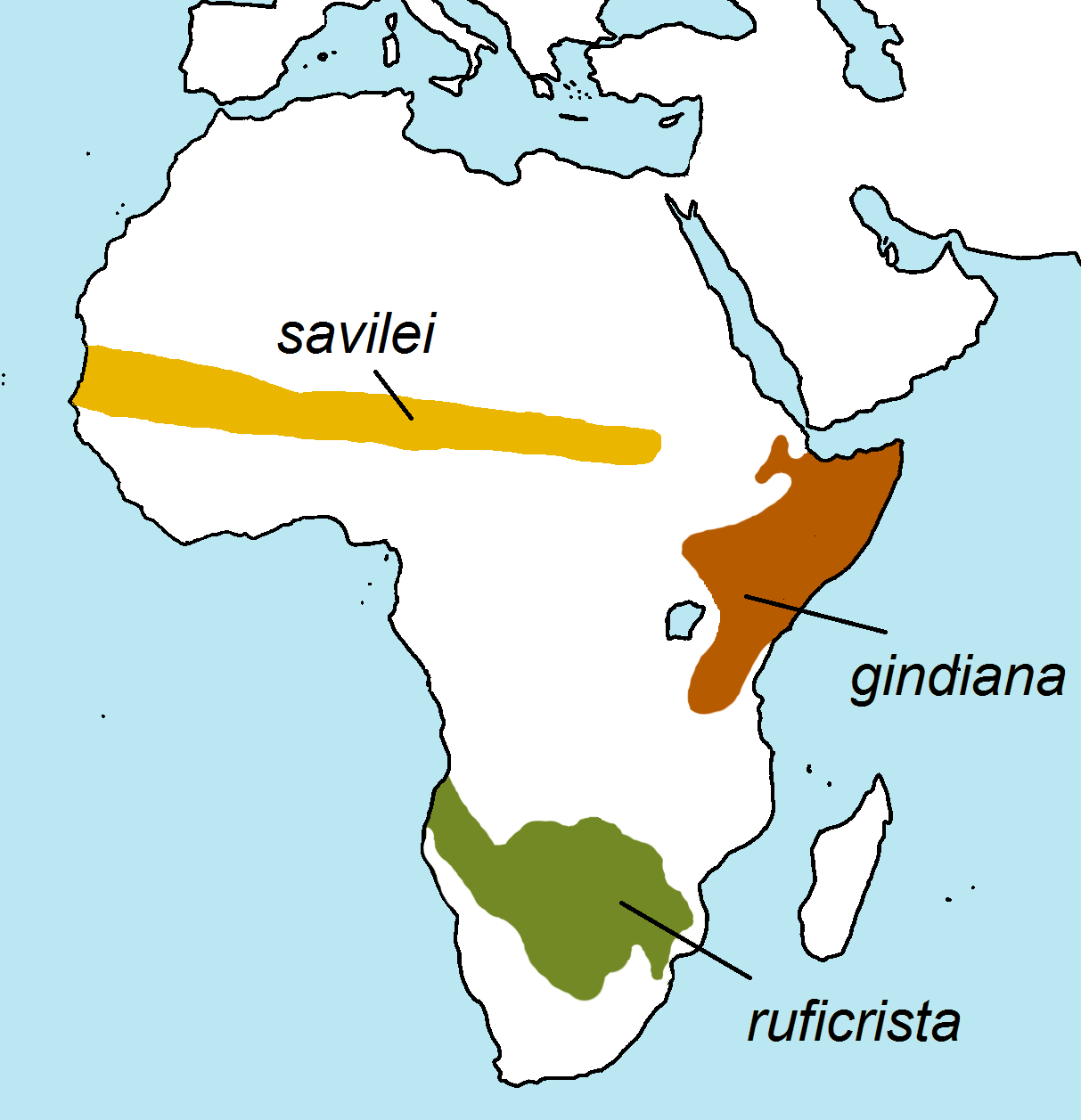
- Range of Lophotis savilei

= Savile's bustard =

Species of bird

Savile's bustard (Lophotis savilei) is a species of bird in the family Otididae. Otididae are an Old-World and understudied family of birds mostly found in Afro-Tropical regions. It is found in Burkina Faso, Cameroon, Chad, Ivory Coast, Gambia, Mali, Mauritania, Niger, Nigeria, Senegal, and Sudan.

== Description ==
Adults have short thin necks and legs, with a large head. The top of head and lower fore-neck are grey with a black streak centrally located on the chin and a small white shoulder strap on each side of the base neck. The upper parts of the bird are pale with black streaks and arrowhead markings. Bill is yellowish, the culmen brownish, the iris pale clayey specked with feet a yellowish clayey colour. Wings are 10 inches 10 inches (25 cm) and tail approximately 5 inches (13 cm). The terminal thirds of their feathers are pale beige which creates a visual distinction between their quills and the rest of the upper parts. Flight feathers are blackish with slender beige bars and the tips black. Males have completely black underparts and show a tuft of rufous feathers on their nape during display. Females look visually similar to males however, lack the blue-grey and black markings on their head. Females have a white throat and the black underparts restricted to the belly.

== Taxonomy ==
The evolutionary relationships within the Otididae family evolution are still speculated, making their taxonomic levels ranging from subspecies to genera have some uncertainties. The Savile's bustard belongs in the genus Lophotis, but was previously thought of belonging to the genus Eupodotis. The Lophotis family has high conflict for its phylogenetic affinity.

The Savile's bustard was discovered by Admiral Lynes and named after a former Governor of the Province of Darfur, Colonel R. V. Savile.

== Habitat and distribution ==
Found in the hotspots of the Bustard species which includes arid and semi-arid habitats. They live in bush and light woodland, near dried pools and clearings, and flat shrubs with Aristida grass and Acacia raddiana. This is similar to the rest of the family Otididae, which typically live in temperate and tropical lowland dry grassland habitats.

Found in SW Mauritania and Senegal E through Mali, Burkina Faso, SW Niger, NE Nigeria, and Chad to C Sudan. The Savile's bustard used to be thought as restricted to the Sahel biome but has now been seen to have expanded southwards.

== Behaviour ==
=== Vocalizations ===
Savile's bustard has a clear and distinctive call, sounding like a whistled 'tuit thit'. Males during display produce a short whistled note followed by a series of short whistles, which often accelerate, tuit! tutututututututut or thut thut-thut-thut-thutututututut. They can also produce a series of frog-like notes in the same rhythm.

=== Diet ===
Not much is known about this bustard's diet however it has been seen to be an important bird predator species to the grasshopper species, Senegalese Grasshopper in Senegal.

=== Mating ===
The family Otididae exhibit lekking behaviour, with most species using exploding leks as their main mating strategy. In exploding lekking, the males are further away from one another compared to traditionally in a classic lekking strategy. In a few species of Otididae that have been studied, there does not appear to be any male parental care and males are thought to be displaying solitary or in dispersed groups during the breeding seasons.

=== Movement ===
Savile's bustard is mostly a sedentary species however it has been noted that in the dry season (December–May) of the Park W in Niger they mov north out of Nigeria when it rains and in order to breed. When they do move it is individually or in pairs in arid and semi-arid habitats. They are relatively secretive and only fly infrequently and only for short distances. This bustard freezes still when they are avoiding being detected by predators.

== Conservation status ==
According to the IUCN Red List, the Savile's bustard is listed as least concern with their population trend being stable. Due to this species' large range, relatively high population densities, and no evidence of declines or substantial threats, it is not considered threatened. It appears to be fairly common in the Yankuri Game Reserve, Nigeria. The species was first recorded in N Cameroon in November 1995, in The Gambia in September 1996, and in N Benin in January 2005.

Despite this species having a stable population trend, many bustard species populations are at risk and declining due to agricultural changes, overgrazing, hunting, trapping, habitat loss, and droughts.
