= L. sibirica =

L. sibirica may refer to:

- Larix sibirica, the Siberian or Russian larch, a frost-hardy tree species native to western Russia
- Ligularia sibirica, a perennial herbaceous plant species native to fens and damp grassy meadows in Siberia, Central and Eastern Europe

== See also ==
- Sibirica
