= Eduard Rüppell =

German naturalist and explorer (1794–1884)

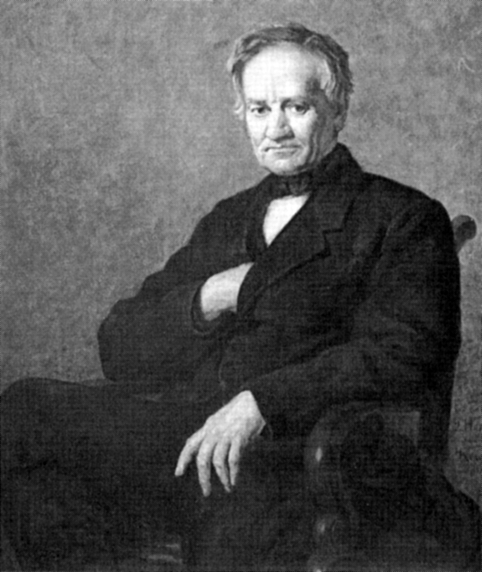
- Eduard Rüppell
- Born: 20 November 1794; Frankfurt am Main
- Died: 10 December 1884 (aged 90)
- Education: University of Pavia
- Scientific career
- Fields: naturalist
- Author abbrev. (zoology): Rüppell

Wilhelm Peter Eduard Simon Rüppell, also spelled Rueppell (20 November 1794 – 10 December 1884) was a German naturalist and explorer, best known for his collections and descriptions of plants and animals from Africa and Arabia.

== Biography ==
Rüppell was born in Frankfurt am Main, the son of a prosperous banker, who was a partner in 'Rüppell und Harnier’s Bank'. He was originally destined to be a merchant, but after a visit to Sinai in 1817, where he met Henry Salt and the Swiss-German traveller Ludwig Burckhardt. He explored Giza and the Pyramids with Salt. In 1818, he developed an interest in natural history, and became elected member of the Senckenbergische Naturforschende Gesellschaft. He attended lectures at the University of Pavia and University of Genoa in botany and zoology.

Rüppell set off on his first expedition in 1821, accompanied by surgeon Michael Hey as his assistant. They travelled through the Sinai desert, and in 1822, were the first European explorers to reach the Gulf of Aqaba. They then proceeded to Alexandria via Mount Sinai. In 1823, they travelled up the Nile to Nubia, collecting specimens in the area south of Ambukol, returning to Cairo in July 1825. A planned journey through Ethiopia only reached as far as Massawa, where the party suffered ill health.

Rüppell returned to Europe in 1827, after battling pirates who had occupied his ship for 2 weeks. During his absence, Philipp Jakob Cretzschmar had used specimens sent back by Rüppell to produce the Atlas zu der Reise im nordlichen Afrika (Atlas of Travels in northern Africa) (1826). In Frankfurt, he published scientific accounts with descriptions of the various animals had encountered.

In 1830, Rüppell returned to Africa, and became the first naturalist to traverse Ethiopia (or Abyssinia as it was known then). He had been sent by the Senckenberg Nature Research Society (Senckenberg Naturforschende Gesellschaft), a learned association based in Frankfurt. He was one of the first collectors of old Abyssinian manuscripts. He climbed Mount Sinai. Then in 1831, his team was based at Massawa for 6 months, while he collected plants and animals from the Red Sea, on excursions to the Dahlac Islands and also inland to Arkeko. He meet an Abyssinian trader 'Genata Mariam' from Gondar, who had 49 camels and 40 mules and donkeys in his caravan. They travelled to Adigrat in the Tigray Region and then through the valley of the Tacazze River to the Semien Mountains. He studied the Gelada Baboon, the Walia Ibex and the Giant Lobelia (Lobelia rhynchopetalum). In Gondar, Rüppell received an audience with the local Emperor Aito Saglu Denghe. He then collected various specimens near Lake Tana and along the uppermost part of the Blue Nile. In 1833, he left Gondar and then travelled to Kiratza and its monastery. In July 1833, the party and his collection sailed from Massawa via Jidda to Egypt, and Rüppell continued to Marseilles and back to Frankfurt. A Russian ship with some of his collection sank off the French coast.

Around 100 new plant species were described in the years 1837-45, due to his collection. The herbarium contains more than 200 specimens and more than 25 species of vascular plants have been named after Rüppell.

He and a number of collaborators described the vertebrates in a series of general publications and later books on birds appeared. From all his journeys in North East Africa and Arabia, it is estimated that Rüppell himself described 32 new genera and 450 species of animals, including the Semien Wolf (Canis simensis Rüppell 1840), the Walia Ibex (Capra walie Rüppell 1835), and the Gelada Baboon (Theropithecus gelada Rüppell 1835).

Rüppell also published accounts of his travels:

- Travels in Abyssinia.
- Rüppell, Eduard (1829). Reisen in Nubien, Kordofan und dem peträischen Arabien, vorzüglich in geographisch-statistischer Hinsicht: mit acht Kupfern und vier Karten. Wilmans.

== Eponymy ==
Species bearing his name include:

- Rüppell's agama, Agama rueppelli
- Rüppell's black chat, Myrmecocichla melaena
- Rüppell's broad-nosed bat, Scoteanax rueppellii
- Rüppell's bustard, Eupodotis rueppellii
- Rueppell's clover, Trifolium rueppellianum
- Rüppell's desert chameleon, Trioceros affinis
- Rüppell's dotted border, Mylothris rueppellii
- Rüppell's fox, Vulpes rueppellii
- Rüppell's horseshoe bat, Rhinolophus fumigatus
- Rüppell's parrot, Poicephalus rueppellii
- Rüppell's pipistrelle, Pipistrellus rueppellii
- Rüppell's robin-chat, Cossypha semirufa
- Rüppell's snake-eyed skink, Ablepharus rueppellii
- Rüppell's starling, Lamprotornis purpuroptera
- Rüppell's vulture, Gyps rueppelli
- Rüppell's warbler, Curruca ruppeli
- Rüppell's weaver, Ploceus galbula

Also named in his honor:

- Gutenbergia rueppellii
- Nemacheilus rueppelli
- Thalassoma rueppelii

== See also ==
- Category:Taxa named by Eduard Rüppell

== Sources ==
- Barbara and Richard Mearns. Biographies for Birdwatchers. ISBN 0-12-487422-3
- Obituary. Proceedings of the Royal Geographical Society and Monthly Record of Geography, New Monthly Series, Vol. 8, No. 10 (Oct., 1886), pp. 654.
