= L. dentata =

L. dentata may refer to:

- Lavandula dentata, the French lavender. a plant species native to Spain
- Ligularia dentata, the summer ragwort, a plant species
- Liophryne dentata, a frog species endemic to Papua New Guinea
- Litoria dentata, the bleating tree frog or Keferstein's tree frog, a tree frog species native to Australia

== See also ==
- Dentata (disambiguation)
