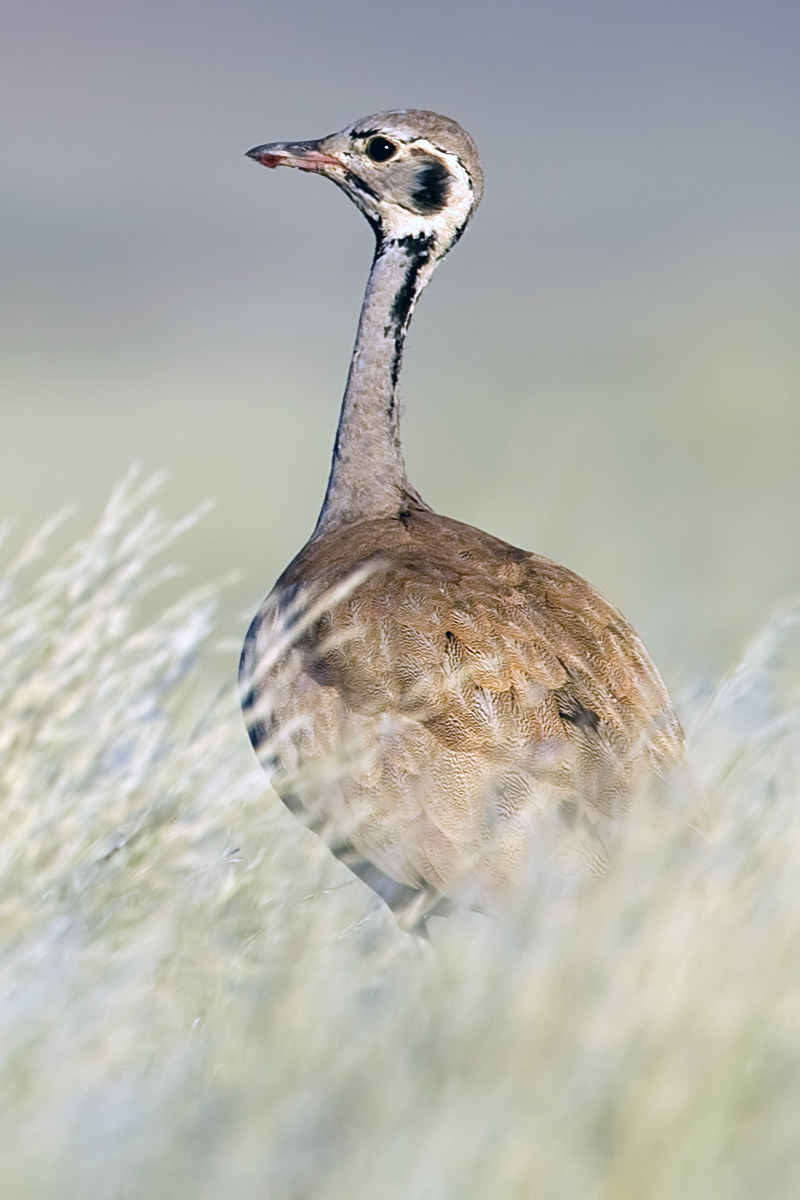
- From Namib-Naukluft National Park

Conservation status
- Least Concern (IUCN 3.1)
- CITES Appendix II

Scientific classification
- Kingdom: Animalia
- Phylum: Chordata
- Class: Aves
- Order: Otidiformes
- Family: Otididae
- Genus: Heterotetrax
- Species: H. rueppelii

Binomial name
- Heterotetrax rueppelii (Wahlberg, 1856)
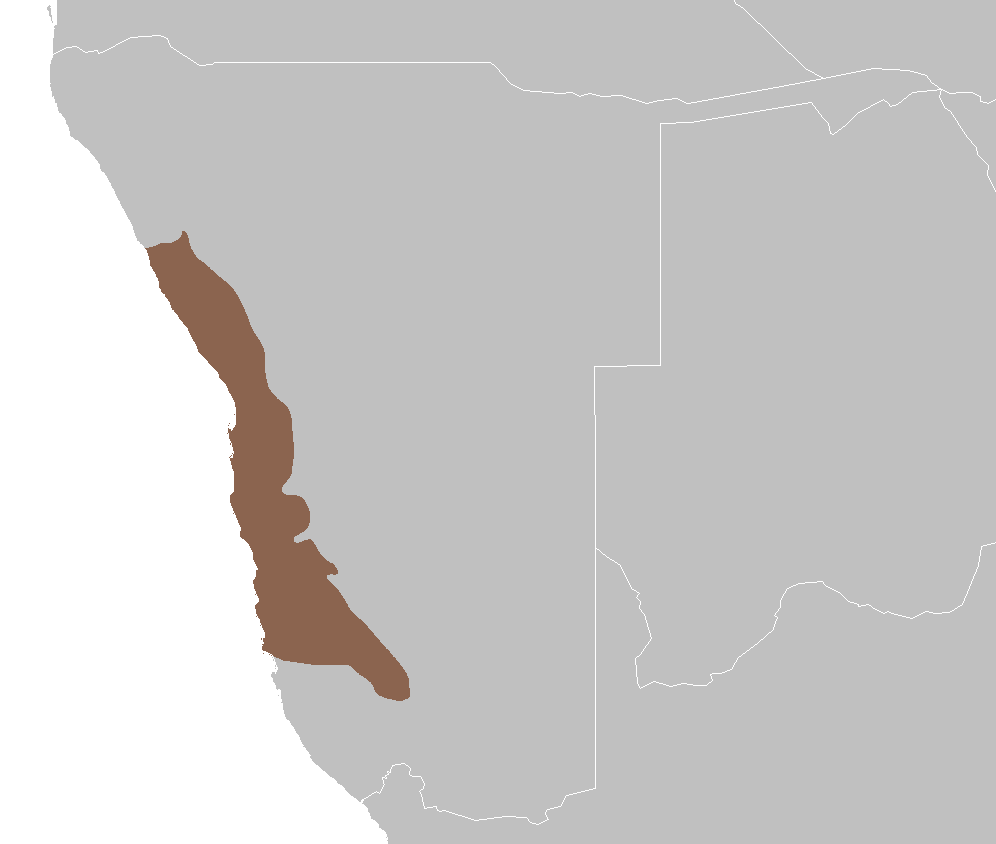
- general range: the Namib desert

Synonyms
- Eupodotis rueppellii

= Rüppell's korhaan =

Species of bird

Rüppell's korhaan (Heterotetrax rueppelii), also known as Rüppell's bustard, is a species of bird in the family Otididae. It is named to recognize Wilhelm Rüppell, a German explorer, collector, and naturalist.

== Description ==
Rüppell's korhaan is a small bustard, only 60 cm (24 in) long. The head and neck are grey, with black stripes down the throat (less marked in females), through the eye, and on the sides of the neck, and with white cheeks. The body is sandy brown above, and white below. The legs are sandy yellow-brown.

== Habitat ==
Rüppell's korhaan is native to southwestern Africa in Angola and Namibia. It is one of thirteen native bird species found in the western part of Namibia. The bird's habitat is areas with low rainfall such as deserts, plains, and savannahs, where its exceptionally well developed senses play a major role in its survival and safety. It is commonly found in the Namibrand Nature Reserve, at Mirabib and Ganab in the Namib-Naukluft Park, at Bloedkoppie, and in the Spitzkoppe surroundings.

== Behaviour ==
Rüppell's korhaan is usually monogamous but sometimes breeds in large family groups. It lays eggs all year round with a peak season from February to May. Nests are made among rocks and stone with some occasional plant coverage. It can lay 1–3 eggs in one breeding cycle and these are incubated solely by the female. Rüppell's korhaan is omnivorous, having a diet of mostly invertebrates such as small reptiles and termites, though it also eats leaves and seeds. Eating is usually done while pecking at the ground as it walks.

== Conservation ==
Bustards are highly susceptible to the loss or modification of habitat, nearly always as a result of increasing pressures from agriculture, hunting, poaching for sport and food - especially during breeding season. As a result of their elusiveness, natural shyness, large home ranges, combined with their camouflage, they are one of the most difficult groups on which to obtain any sufficient biological, population, or mortality data.

A study focused on 10 bird species in Nambia whose range is poorly known, including Rüppel's korhaan, in order to predict population density and distribution. The information from this study can assist further assist conservation of birds that are otherwise difficult to observe.

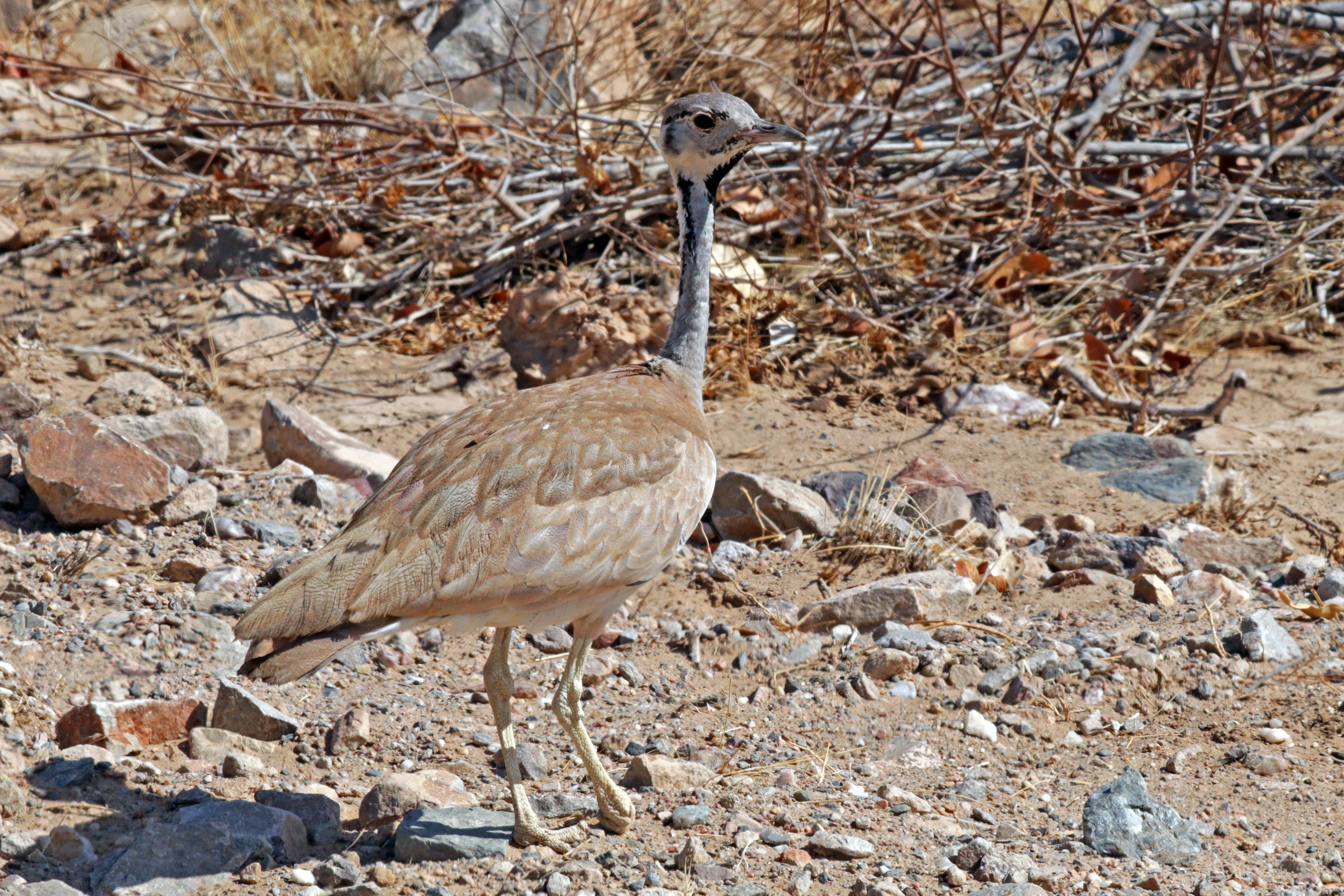
Adult male

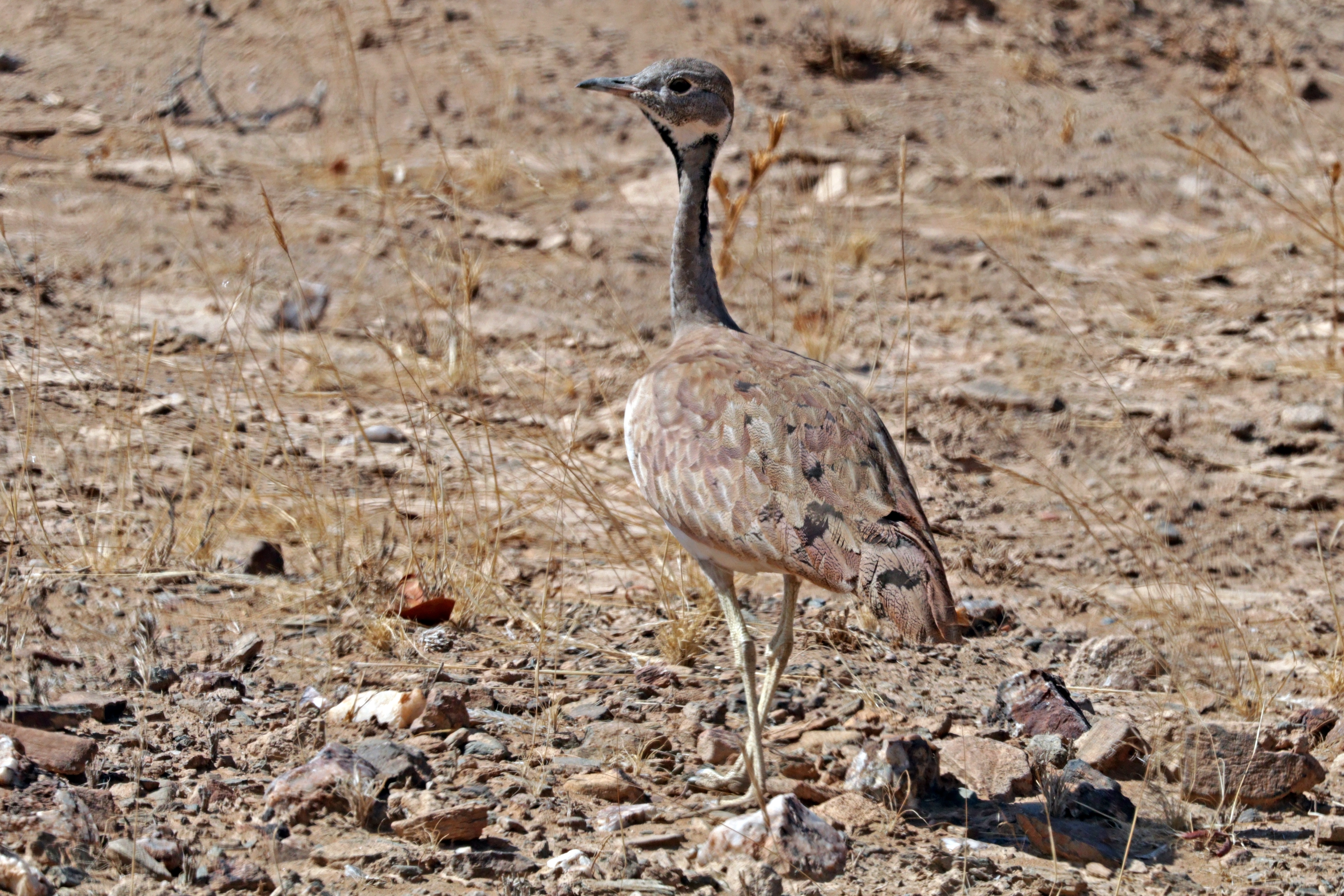
Juvenile male
