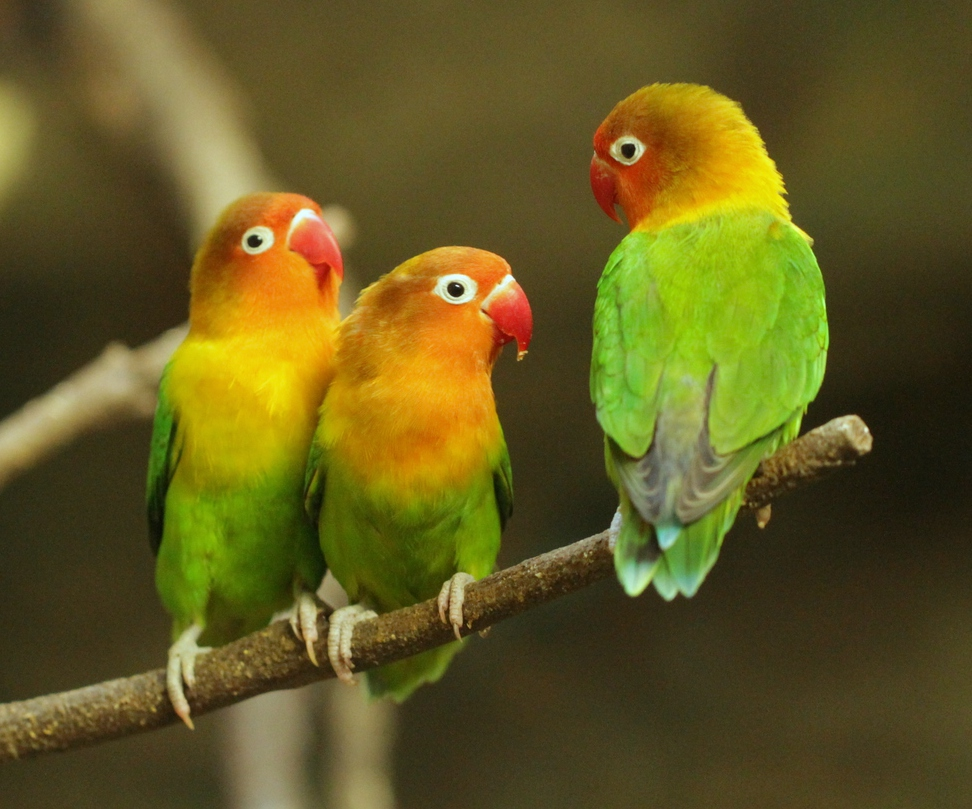
- At Ueno Zoo, Japan

Conservation status
- Near Threatened (IUCN 3.1)
- CITES Appendix II

Scientific classification
- Kingdom: Animalia
- Phylum: Chordata
- Class: Aves
- Order: Psittaciformes
- Family: Psittaculidae
- Genus: Agapornis
- Species: A. fischeri

Binomial name
- Agapornis fischeri Reichenow, 1887
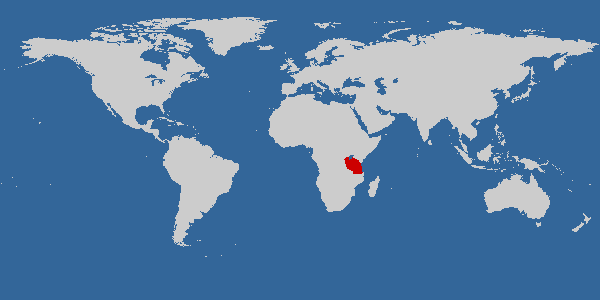

Synonyms
- Agapornis personata fischeri

= Fischer's lovebird =

Species of bird

Fischer's lovebird (Agapornis fischeri) is a small parrot species of the genus Agapornis. They were originally discovered in the late 19th century. They are named after the 19th century German explorer of East Africa Gustav Fischer.

== Description ==
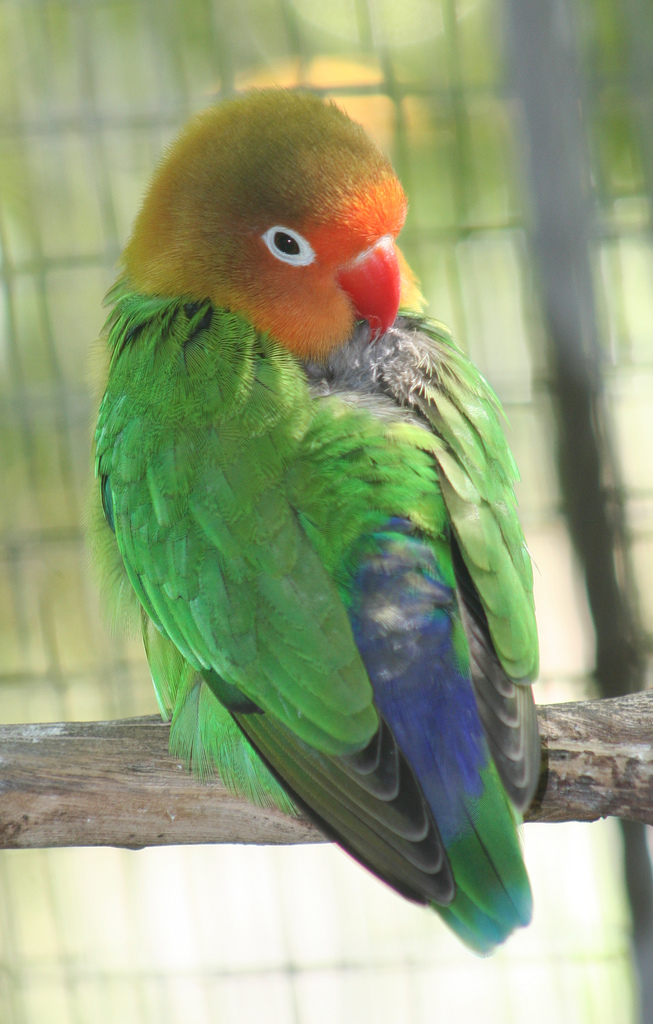
Green back and blue rump

The Fischer's lovebird has a green back, chest, and wings. Their necks are a golden yellow and as it progresses upward it becomes darker orange. The top of the head is olive green, and the beak is bright red. The upper surface of the tail has some purple or blue feathers. It has a white circle of bare skin (eye-ring) around its eyes. Young birds are very similar to the adults, except for the fact that they are duller and the base of their mandible has brown markings. They are one of the smaller lovebirds, about 14 cm (5.5 in) in length and 43-58g weight.

While most Fischer's lovebirds are green, several color variations have been bred. The blue variation is predominant; lacking yellow, it has a bright blue back, tail, and chest, a white neck, a pale grey head and a pale pink beak. This mutation was first bred by R. Horsham in South Africa in 1957. There is a yellow lutino mutation, which first appeared in France. These birds are typically pale yellow with an orange face and a red beak. Further mutations are pied, black or dark eyed white, cinnamon, white, and albino mutations that have also been bred.

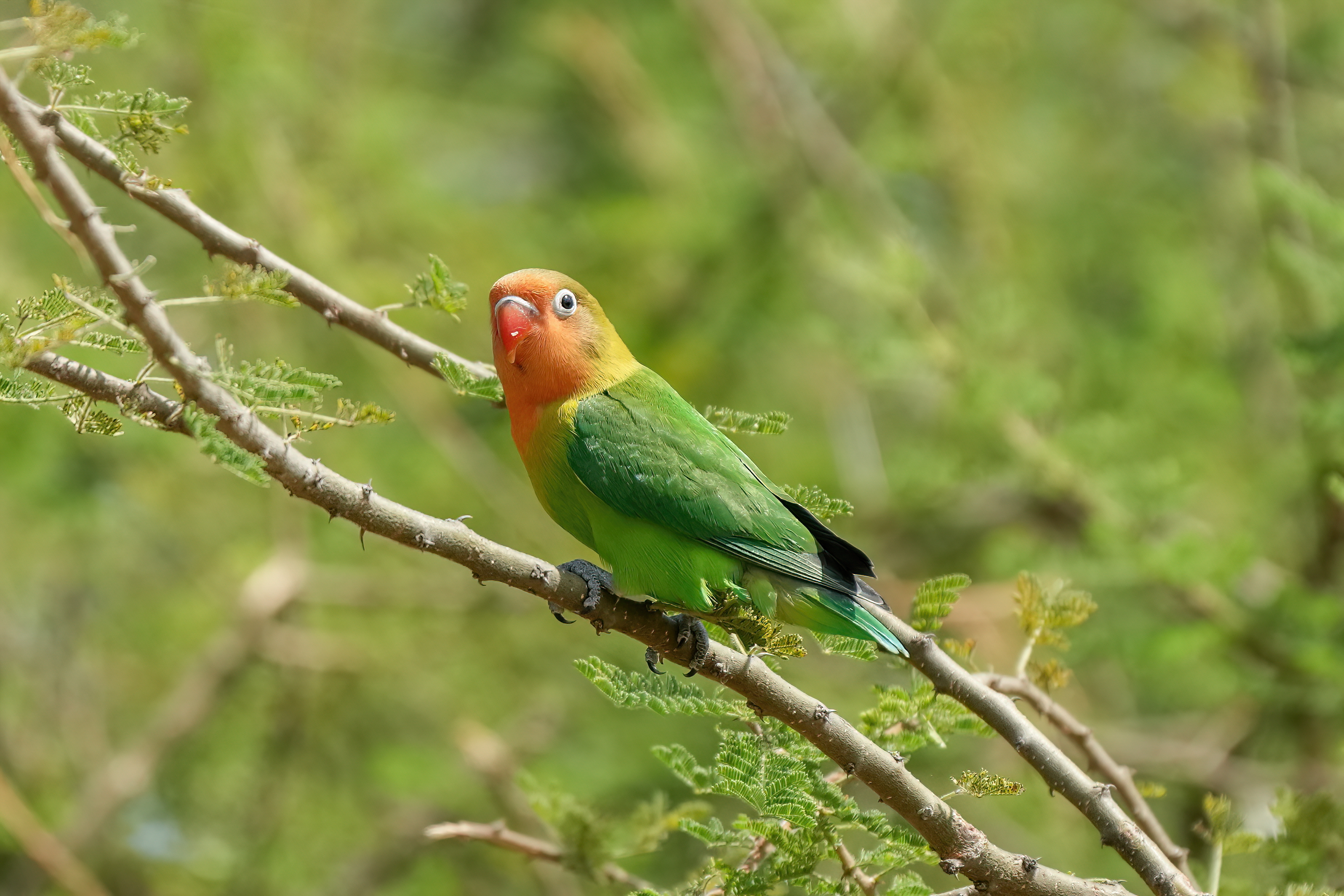
Fischer's lovebird in the Serengeti National Park, Tanzania

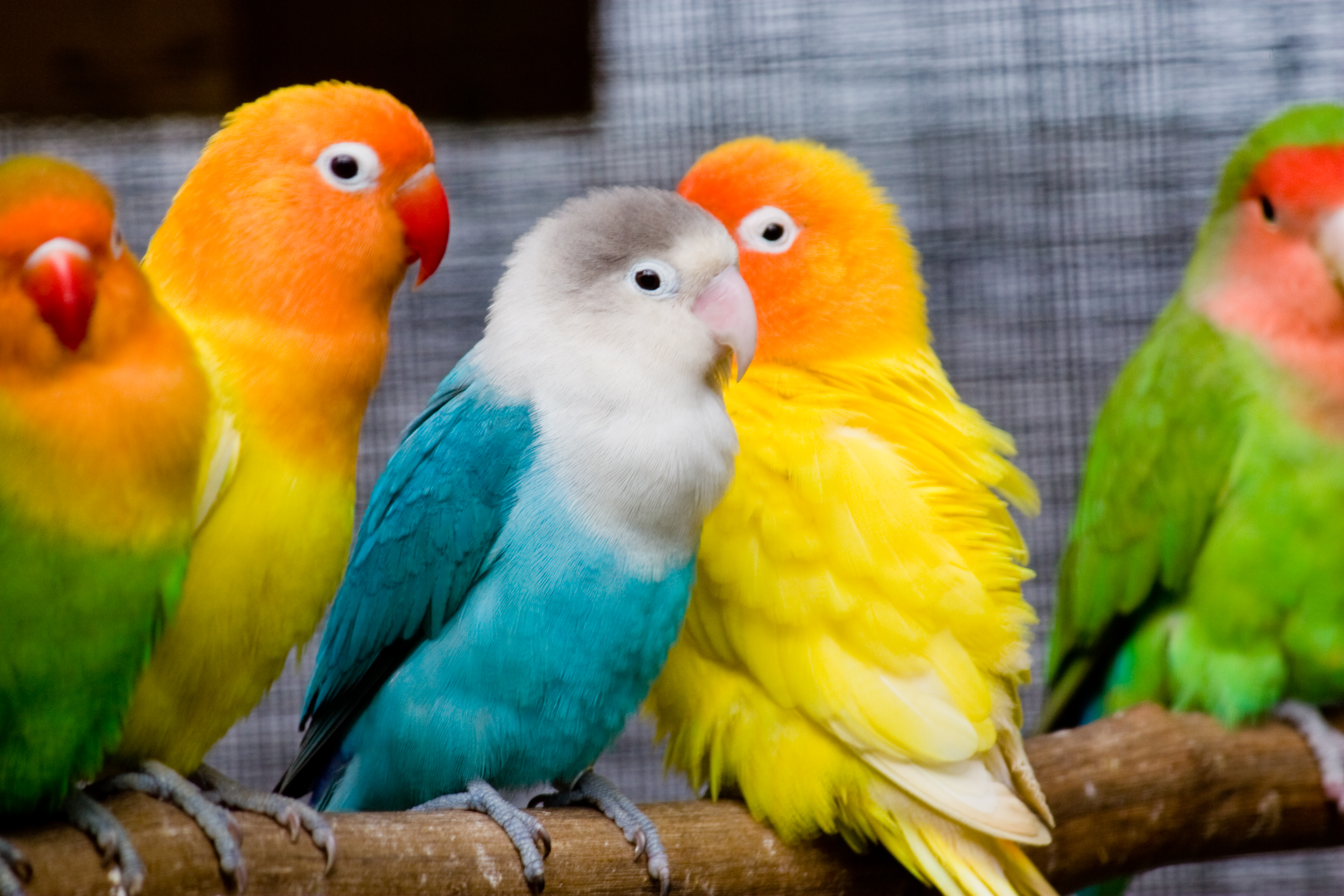
Lutino (yellow/orange) and Blue mutation

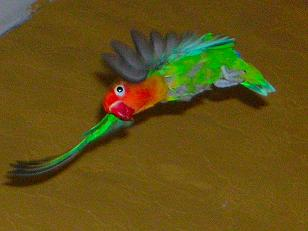
A Fischer's lovebird in flight

== Sexual morphism ==
Fischer's lovebirds show no sexual dimorphism; therefore, it is impossible to tell whether an individual is male or female through plumage alone.

The sexes of Agapornis fischeri appear the same, and are distinguished with certainty through DNA testing, and less certainly by their habits in perching. Generally, females sit with their legs farther apart than males because the female pelvis is wider.

== Distribution and habitat ==
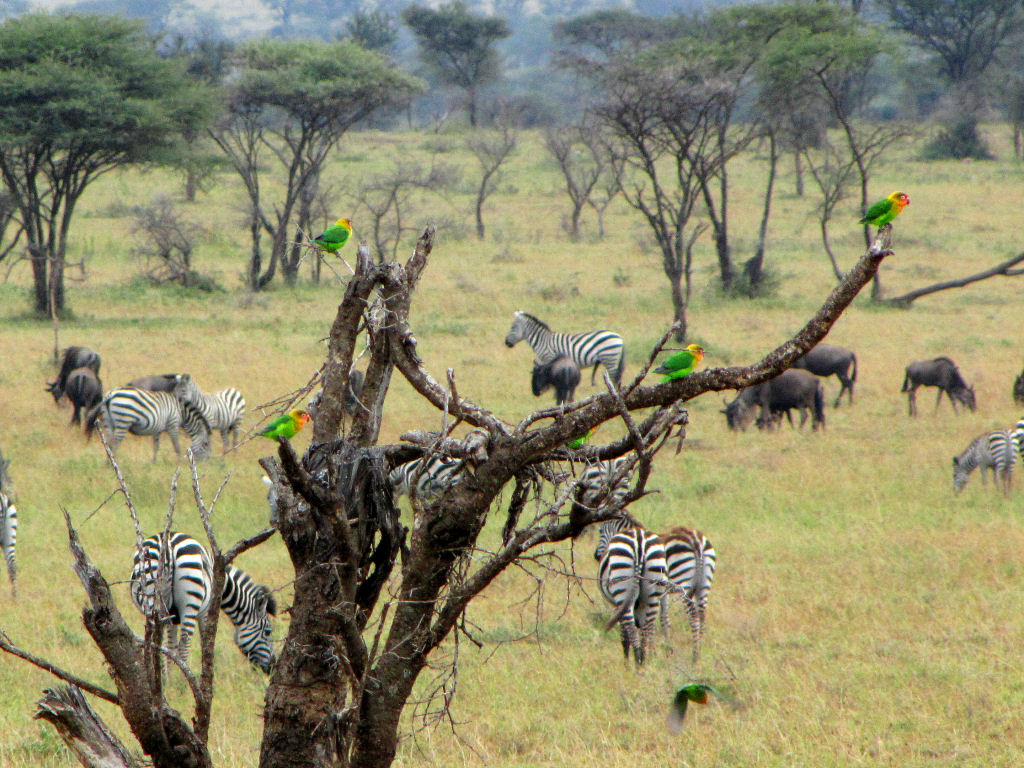
Flock in tree in Serengeti, Tanzania

Fischer's lovebird are native to a small area of east-central Africa, south and southeast of Lake Victoria in northern Tanzania. In drought years, some birds move west into Rwanda and Burundi seeking moister conditions. They live at elevations of 1,100-2,200m (3,600-7,200 ft) in small flocks. They live in isolated clumps of trees with grass plains between them. The population is estimated to be between 290,000 and 1,000,000, with low densities outside of protected areas due to capture for the pet trade; export licenses were suspended in 1992 to halt any further decline in the species. Although they have been observed in the wild in Puerto Rico and Florida, they are probably the result of escaped pets, and no reproduction has been recorded. Around 100 mating pairs can be found in the wild between Porches and Armacao de Pera and Lagoa area in the Algarve region of Portugal. They have also been observed in the U.S. Virgin Islands.

== Behaviour ==
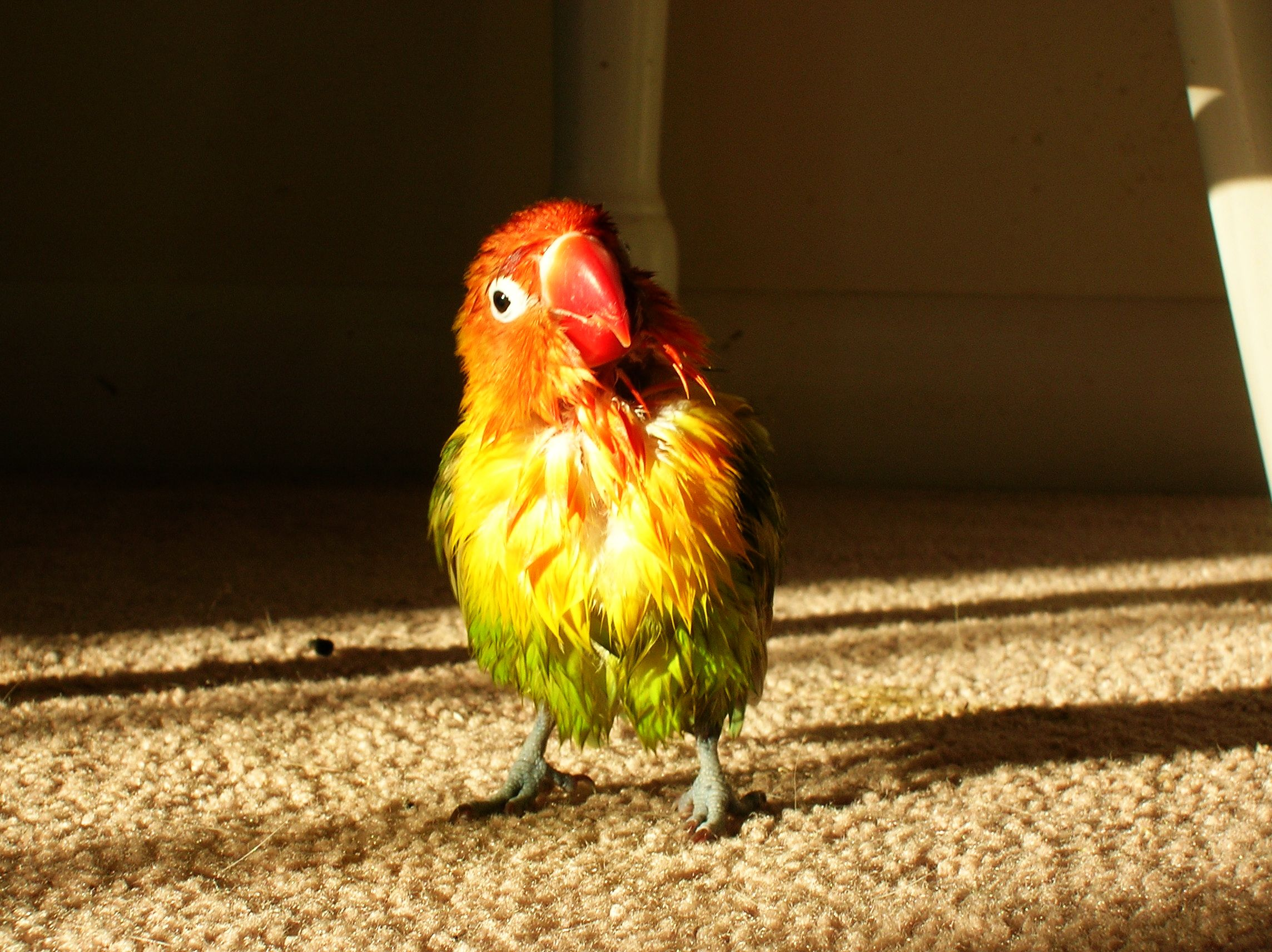
After a bath, they like to sun themselves.

Fischer's lovebirds can fly fast, and the sound of their wings flapping as they fly can be heard. Like all Lovebirds, they are very vocal and when they do make noise they have a high-pitched chirp.

=== Food and feeding ===
Fischer's lovebirds eat a wide variety of foods, including seeds and fruit. They sometimes are pests to farmers, as they eat their crops such as maize and millet.

=== Breeding ===
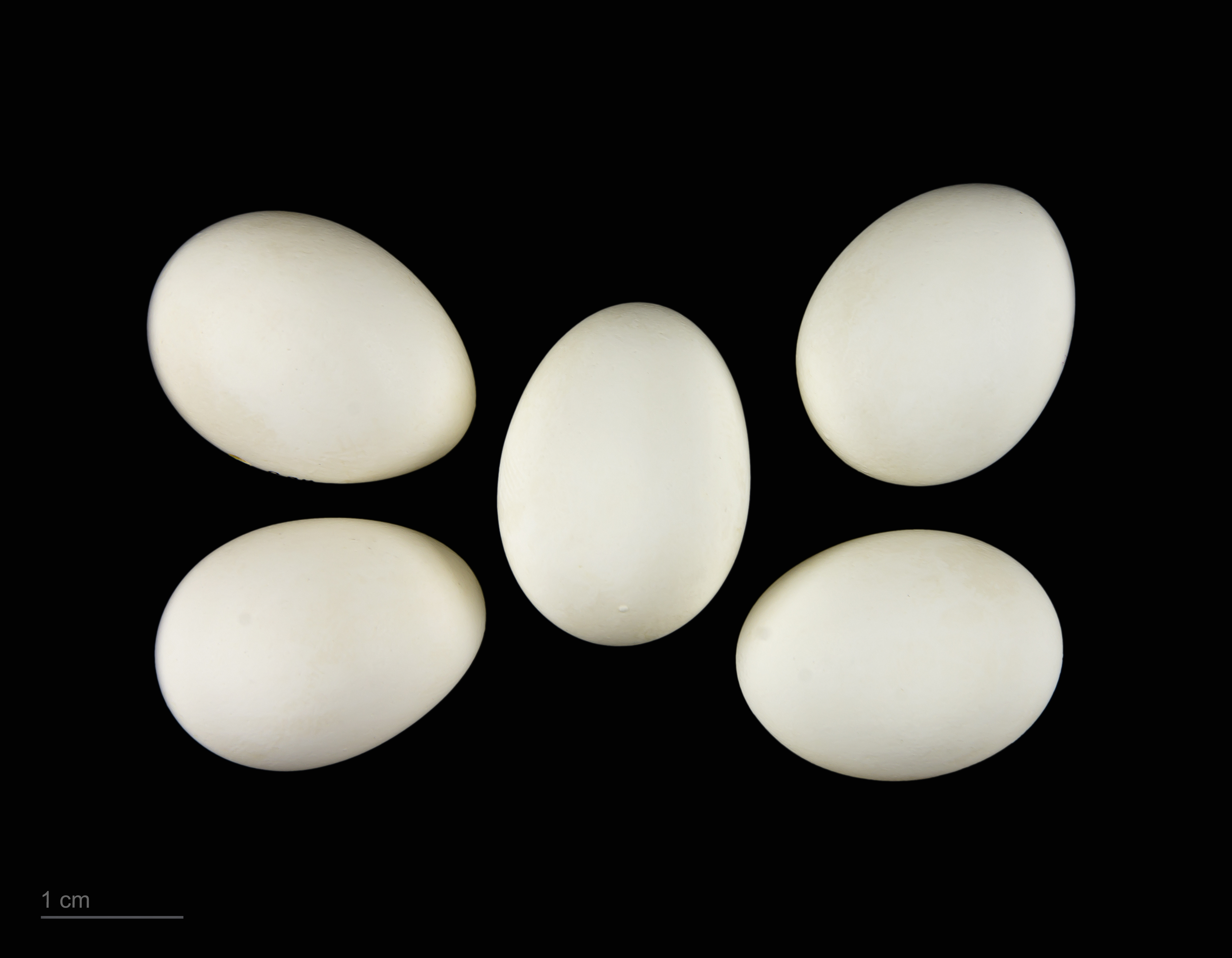
Agapornis fischeri - MHNT

Fischer's lovebirds, like other lovebirds in the genus Agapornis, mate for life. The term lovebird arose from the strong bonds that mates make with one another. When separated, the physical health of each individual will suffer. Mates like to be in physical contact as much as possible. The breeding season is January through April and June through July. The nest is in a hole in a tree 2 to 15 metres above the ground. The eggs are white and there are usually four or five in a clutch, but there could be as few as three or as many as eight. The female incubates the eggs for 23 days, and the chicks fledge from the nest about 38–42 days after hatching.

== Aviculture ==
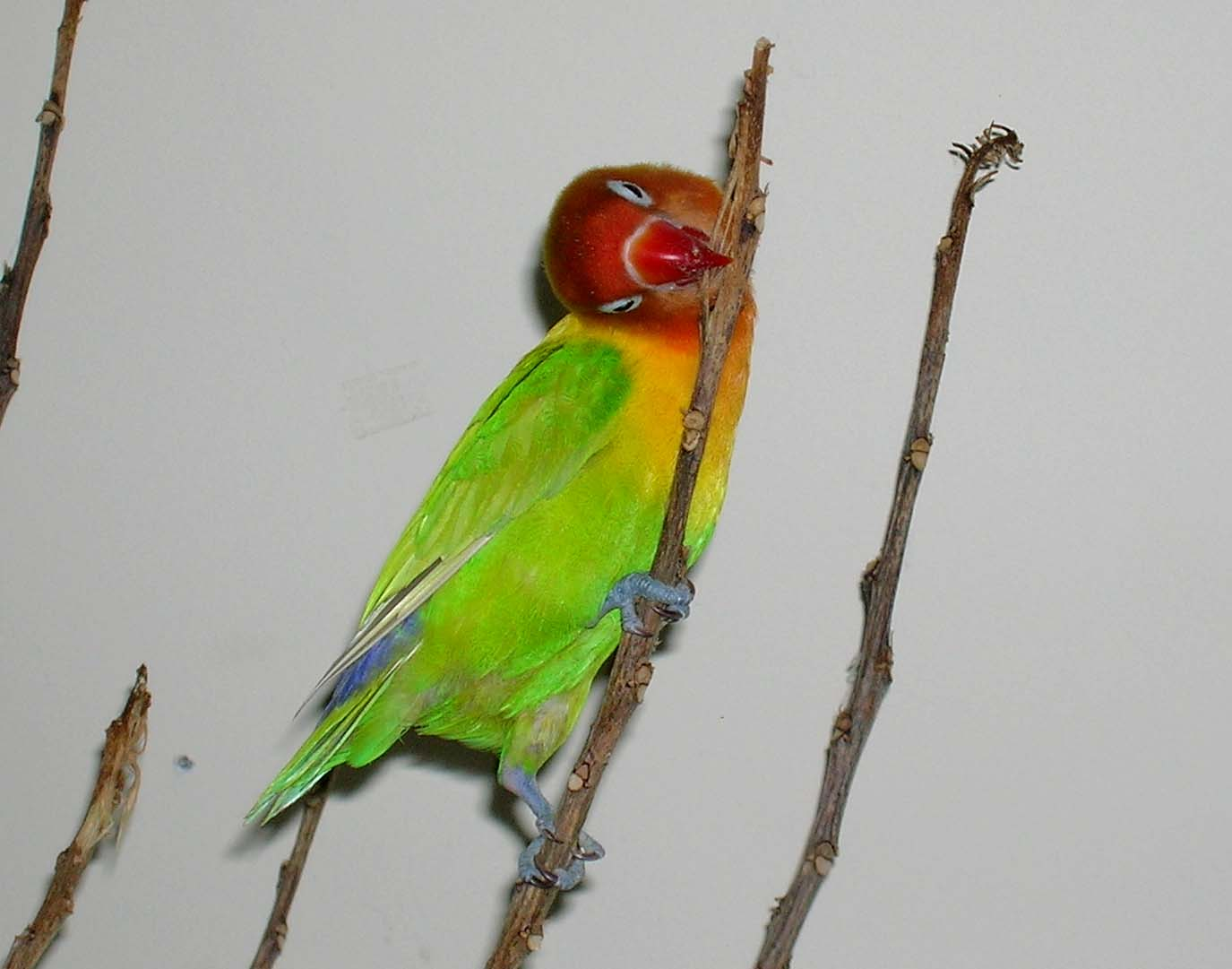
Lovebirds are active and commonly chew items in their surroundings.

Fischer's lovebirds are difficult birds to keep healthy in captivity. They are active birds that need a lot of room. When confined to a cage their health tends to suffer.

=== Personality ===
Though they're not considered as docile as many other parrots, they enjoy spending time with their owners, and require regular interaction.

As with many parrots, lovebirds are intelligent and inquisitive birds. In captivity, they like to investigate, and have been known to figure out ways to escape from their cages, and to find hiding places where they may get stuck, and where it may be difficult to locate them.

Lovebirds are avid chewers, with strong beaks. They can enjoy "preening" the hair and clothing of their owners, and chewing on clothing, buttons, watches, and jewelry.

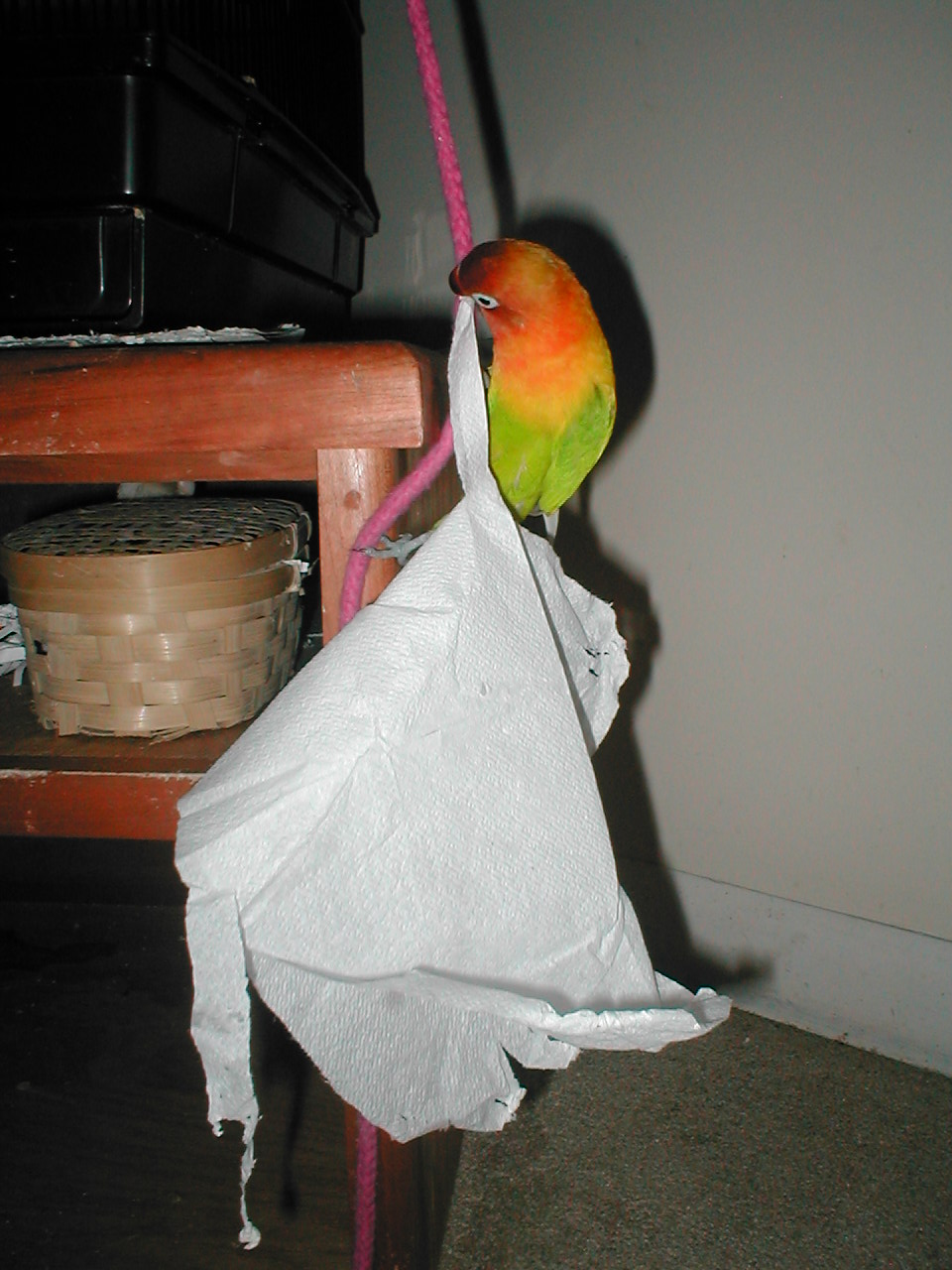
Lovebirds are very active.

Female lovebirds are supposedly more aggressive than the males but both can make fine pets with patience and correct training.

Lovebirds (in general) are not known for their talking ability, although there are some lovebirds that do learn words - the females are usually the ones that do this. As is the case when many smaller parrots, the "voice" of lovebirds is high-pitched and raspy and it may be difficult to understand their speech.

Lovebirds are very vocal birds, making loud, high-pitched noises that can be a nuisance to neighbors. They make noise all day, but especially at certain times of day. However, Fischer's are not quite as loud as some other lovebird varieties, and while they cheep frequently, they do not scream like the larger parrots. Their noise level increases substantially when they are engaged in pre-mating rituals.

=== Health problems ===
Fischer's lovebirds, like many captive birds, can suffer from feather-plucking and infections as a result of their obsessive biting of feathers and feet due to high levels of stress. This is more likely to occur with single lovebirds than those kept in pairs or groups. One hypothesis is that they suffer from hormonal problems caused by changing light levels and the inability to perform things Fischer's lovebirds in the wild would naturally perform, such as building a nest, socializing in groups, flying high and foraging. Another hypothesis is that it is caused by a pathogen. Treatments usually involve antibiotics for the wounds, some way to stop them from continuing the biting of the area and a change of environment. The Elizabeth collar may also be used, though wearing them is extremely stressful both to the bird wearing the collar and to the birds around it, and some lovebirds may start feather-plucking as a result of the stress.

Lovebirds require a varied daily diet. Female lovebirds may suffer from egg-binding due to mineral imbalance, an often fatal condition in which an eggshell does not harden and gets caught in the reproductive tract.
