= Gutenbergia rueppellii =

Scientific classification
- Kingdom: Plantae
- Clade: Tracheophytes
- Clade: Angiosperms
- Clade: Eudicots
- Clade: Asterids
- Order: Asterales
- Family: Asteraceae
- Genus: Gutenbergia
- Species: G. rueppellii

Binomial name
- Gutenbergia rueppellii Sch.Bip., 1840

Synonyms
- Ethulia rueppellii Hochst. ex A.Rich.; Gutenbergia abyssinica Sch.Bip.; Gutenbergia arenarioides Muschl.; Gutenbergia elgonensis R.E.Fr.; Gutenbergia oppositifolia O.Hoffm. & Muschl.

Species of flowering plant

Gutenbergia rueppellii is an African species of flowering plant in the family Asteraceae.

== Description ==
Annual or perennial herb, 3–75 cm tall, sometimes rather woody and often densely tufted; stems erect or rarely decumbent or spreading. Leaves alternate or the proximal opposite, linear to narrowly ovate, (narrowly) elliptic or oblanceolate, 0.4–10 cm long, 0.1-1.4 cm wide, base cuneate to +/- expanded-auriculate, margins sub-entire, apex obtuse to acute, apiculate, green and sparsely pubescent to silvery- grey above, white tomentose beneath. Capitula rather few to very numerous in small to lax and diffuse terminal and upper axillary corymbiform cymes; stalks of individual capitula shortly white-hairy, involucre obconic-turbinate to campanulate- hemispherical 2–6 mm in diameter at flowering time; phyllaries 3-4 seriate, ovate to ovate-oblong, the inner 3.5–7 mm long, acute, pungent, straight or recurving at the apex, darker green and often purple-tinged at the centre towards the apex, densely pubescent to glabrescent, scarious and shortly pectinate-fimbriate at the margins. Corolla 3.3–7 mm long, purple or violet, rarely white, lobes white hairy with appressed hairs, 1.3–3 mm long. Achenes obconic-cylindrical or ellipsoid-cylindrical, slightly constricted towards the apex, often slightly curved, 1.2-2.2 mm long (7 or 10) ribbed, with slightly more prominent ribs alternating with slightly less prominent ribs, sparsely ascending hairy or glabrous, pappus absent.

== Taxonomy ==
It is named after the German naturalist Eduard Rüppell, who had travelled in Abyssinia in 1830.

It was found in Abyssinia, and then first published and described by Carl Heinrich 'Bipontinus' Schultz in 'Gedenkb'. IV (edited by Jubelf. Buchdr.) on page 120 and table4 in 1840.

== Distribution ==
The species is native to an area of central East Africa. Countries and regions that is occurs in are: Zaïre; Tanzania; Burundi; Kenya; Uganda; Somalia; South Sudan; Ethiopia; Sudan?; and Eritrea.

It is listed as a threatened plant of the forests of Cherangani hills, Kenya.

== Habitat ==
It grows on wooded savannas and on the edges of cornfields, at 850–800 m (2,790–2,620 ft) m above sea level.

It also grows on Dry bushland, open woodland or thickets and in grassland, on shallow soils over rock or on black cotton soils (Vertisol).

== Uses ==
In Ethiopia, it is commonly known as Bututtu iluu and the leaves of the plant are used as fodder for cattle, sheep and goats.

== Variety ==
It has one known variety; Gutenbergia rueppellii var. fischeri (R.E.Fr.) C.Jeffrey. with its own synonym Gutenbergia fischeri R.E.Fr. The variety is named after the late 19th century German explorer of East Africa Gustav Fischer. It is native to Kenya and Tanzania, and was published by Charles Jeffrey (1934-) based on an earlier description by Robert Elias Fries in Kew Bull. Vol.43 on page 254 in 1988. It differs from the main form, in habit, leaf-shape, size of capitula (flower head) and achene (fruit).
