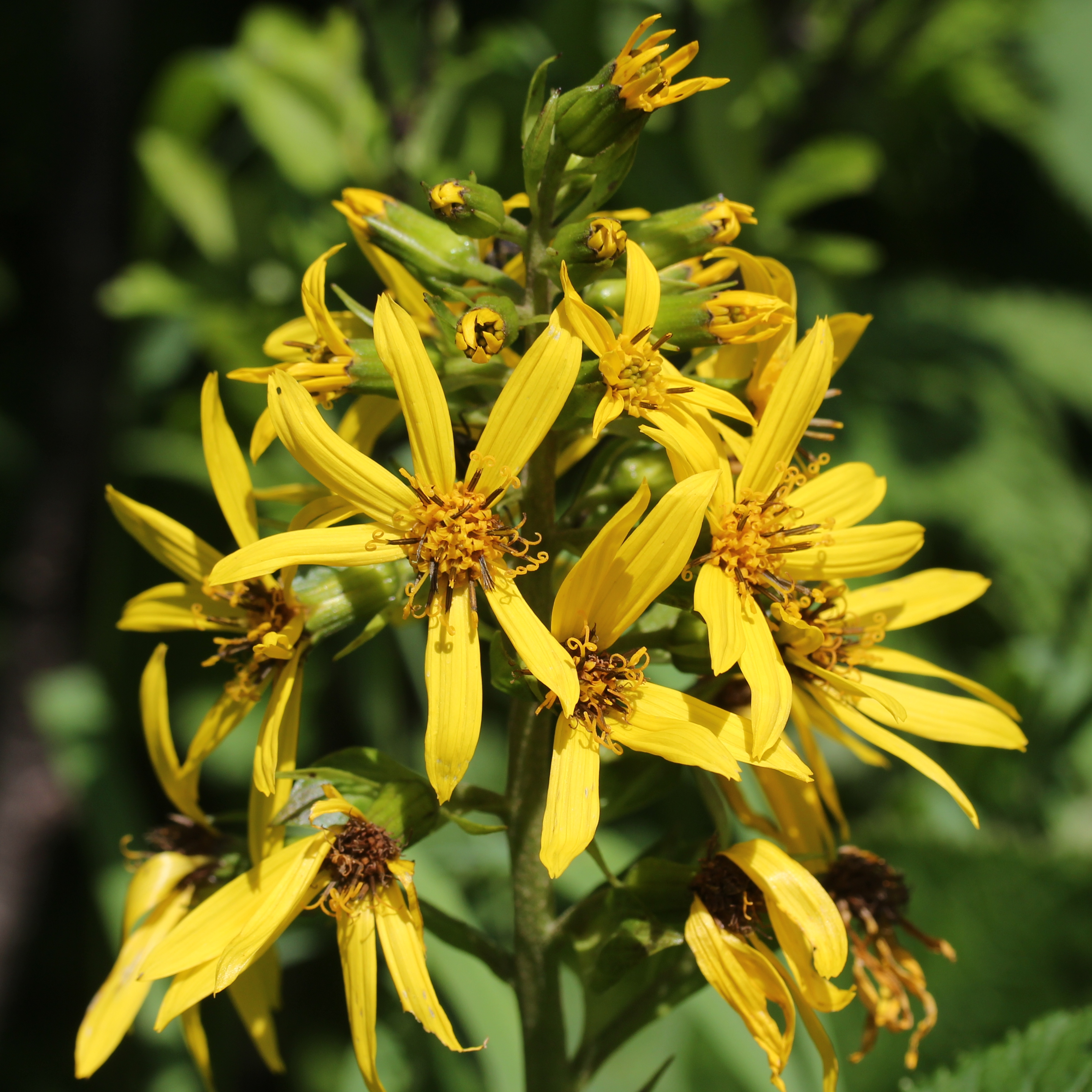

Scientific classification
- Kingdom: Plantae
- Clade: Tracheophytes
- Clade: Angiosperms
- Clade: Eudicots
- Clade: Asterids
- Order: Asterales
- Family: Asteraceae
- Genus: Ligularia
- Species: L. fischeri

Binomial name
- Ligularia fischeri (Ledeb.) Turcz.

Synonyms
- Synonyms: Cineraria elata Steud.; Cineraria fischeri Ledeb.; Cineraria speciosa Fisch. ex Turcz.; Cineraria speciosa Schrad. ex Link; Hoppea speciosa (Schrad. ex Link) Rchb.; Ligularia fischeri f. fischeri; Ligularia glabrescens Vorosch.; Ligularia racemosa DC.; Ligularia sibirica var. longibracteata Kitam.; Ligularia sibirica var. racemosa (DC.) Kitam.; Ligularia sibirica var. speciosa (Schrad. ex Link) DC.; Ligularia speciosa (Schrad. ex Link) Fisch. & C.A.Mey.; Senecio ligularia var. atkinsonii (C.B.Clarke) Hook.f.; Senecio ligularia var. ligularia; Senecio racemosus Wall. [Invalid]; Senecio splendens H.Lév. & Vaniot

= Ligularia fischeri =

Species of flowering plant

Ligularia fischeri, known as gomchwi, Fischer's ragwort, or Fischer's leopard plant, is a species in the genus Ligularia (family Asteraceae). It is native to east Asia. Part of the plant's name commemorates the late 19th century German explorer of East Africa Gustav Fischer.

== Description ==
Ligularia fischeri is a clump-forming herbaceous perennial and can grow up to 2 m (6 ft 7 in) tall. It has coarsely toothed, kidney-shaped light green basal leaves, up to 40 cm (16 in) across, on long stalks, the stem leaves smaller and on shorter stalks. The in midsummer, it has racemes of up to 75 cm (30 in) long of yellow flowerheads, 5 cm (2 in) across. Later after it has bloomed, it produces a seed capsule, with seeds with downy hairs which are tinged brown or purple.

== Culinary use ==
=== Korea ===
In Korean cuisine, the leaves of gomchwi along with other chwinamul varieties are often used as the main ingredient of herbal side dishes called namul. Gomchwi can be eaten pickled as jangajji or kimchi, and eaten fresh as a ssam (wrap) vegetable.

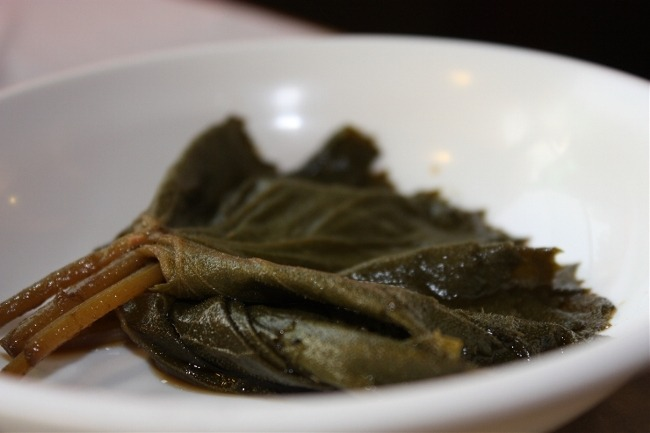
Gomchwi-jangajji (pickled gomchwi)
