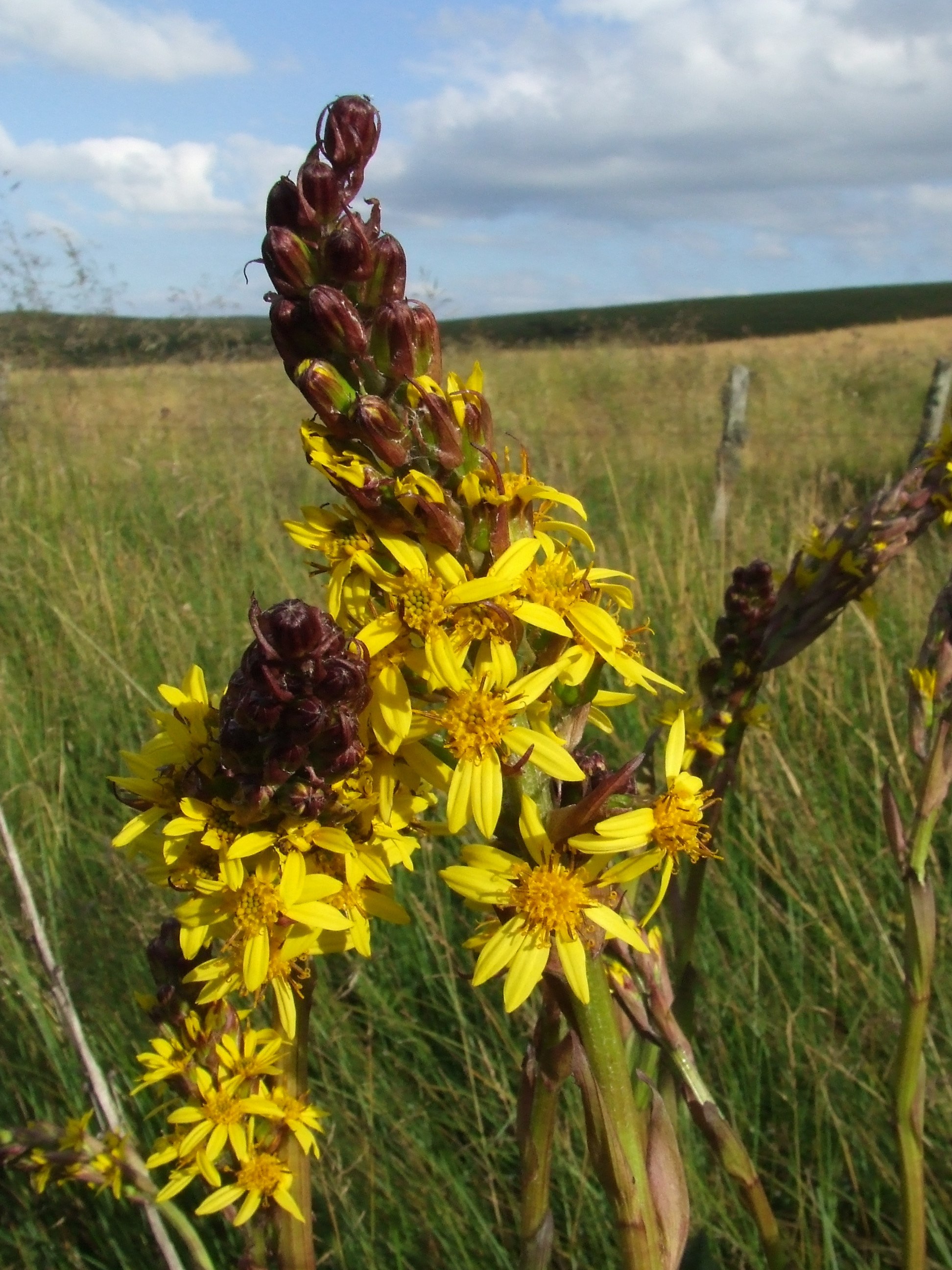
- Ligularia sibirica

Scientific classification
- Kingdom: Plantae
- Clade: Tracheophytes
- Clade: Angiosperms
- Clade: Eudicots
- Clade: Asterids
- Order: Asterales
- Family: Asteraceae
- Subfamily: Asteroideae
- Tribe: Senecioneae
- Genus: Ligularia; Cass. 1816, conserved name, not Duval 1809 (Saxifragaceae)

Type species
- L. sibirica

Synonyms
- Erythrochaete Siebold & Zucc.; Cyathocephalum Nakai; Senecillis Gaertn.

= Ligularia =

Genus of flowering plants

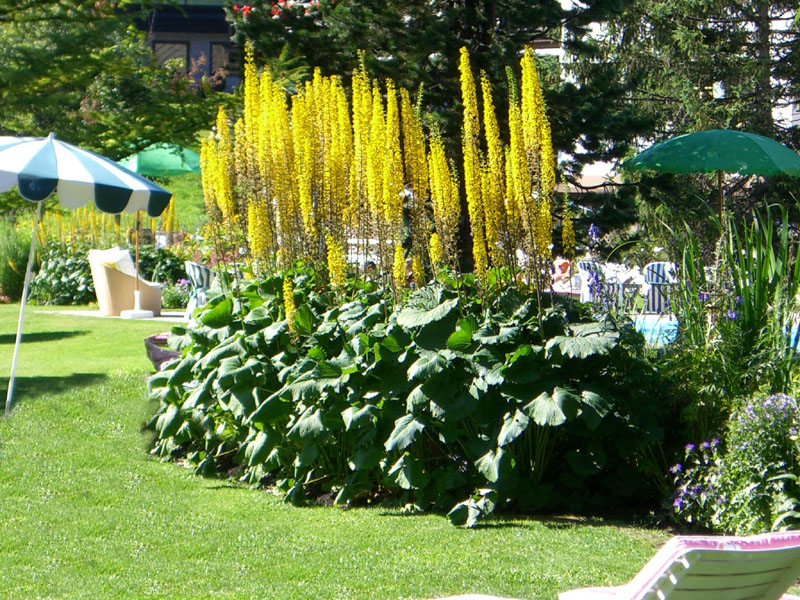
’The Rocket’ (L. stenocephala)

Ligularia (leopard plant) is a genus of Old World herbaceous perennial plants in the groundsel tribe within the sunflower family. They have yellow or orange composite flower heads with brown or yellow central disc florets, and are native to damp habitats mostly in central and eastern Asia, with a few species from Europe. There are about 120 to 140 species in the genus, and over half are endemic to China. The name Ligularia, from the Latin for "strap", refers to the shape of the ray florets.

Some species and cultivars are cultivated as ornamentals. Ligularia dentata ‘Britt Marie Crawford’ Ligularia x hessei (Ligularia dentata x Ligularia wilsoniana) 'Gregynog Gold' and Ligularia przewalskii 'The Rocket' have gained the Royal Horticultural Society's Award of Garden Merit. They are best grown in fertile, moist soil and full sun, with some shade at midday.

Species

- Ligularia abakanica
- Ligularia achyrotricha
- Ligularia afghanica
- Ligularia alatipes
- Ligularia alpigena
- Ligularia altaica
- Ligularia alticola
- Ligularia altissima
- Ligularia amplexicaulis
- Ligularia angusta
- Ligularia anoleuca
- Ligularia atkinsonii
- Ligularia atroviolacea
- Ligularia biceps
- Ligularia botryodes
- Ligularia brassicoides
- Ligularia bucovinensis
- Ligularia cacaliiformis
- Ligularia caloxantha
- Ligularia calthifolia
- Ligularia carpatica
- Ligularia chalybea
- Ligularia chekiangensis
- Ligularia chimiliensis
- Ligularia confertiflora
- Ligularia coreana
- Ligularia cremanthodioides
- Ligularia cuneata
- Ligularia curvisquama
- Ligularia cyathiceps
- Ligularia cymbulifera
- Ligularia cymosa
- Ligularia dentata
- Ligularia dictyoneura
- Ligularia discoidea
- Ligularia dolichobotrys
- Ligularia duciformis
- Ligularia dux
- Ligularia eriocaulis
- Ligularia euryphylla
- Ligularia fangiana
- Ligularia fargesii
- Ligularia fauriei
- Ligularia fischeri
- Ligularia franchetiana
- Ligularia ghatsukupa
- Ligularia glauca
- Ligularia heterophylla
- Ligularia hodgsonii
- Ligularia hookeri
- Ligularia hopeiensis
- Ligularia ianthochaeta
- Ligularia intermedia
- Ligularia jacquemontiana
- Ligularia jaluensis
- Ligularia jamesii
- Ligularia japonica
- Ligularia kaialpina
- Ligularia kanaitzensis
- Ligularia kangtingensis
- Ligularia karataviensis
- Ligularia kareliniana
- Ligularia kingiana
- Ligularia knorringiana
- Ligularia kojimae
- Ligularia konkalingensis
- Ligularia lamarum
- Ligularia lanipes
- Ligularia lankongensis
- Ligularia lapathifolia
- Ligularia latihastata
- Ligularia latipes
- Ligularia leveillei
- Ligularia liatroides
- Ligularia lidjiangensis
- Ligularia limprichtii
- Ligularia lingiana
- Ligularia longifolia
- Ligularia longihastata
- Ligularia macrodonta
- Ligularia macrophylla
- Ligularia melanocephala
- Ligularia melanothyrsa
- Ligularia microcardia
- Ligularia microcephala
- Ligularia mongolica
- Ligularia muliensis
- Ligularia myriocephala
- Ligularia nanchuanica
- Ligularia narynensis
- Ligularia nelumbifolia
- Ligularia nyingchiensis
- Ligularia odontomanes
- Ligularia oligonema
- Ligularia pachycarpa
- Ligularia palmatifida
- Ligularia paradoxa
- Ligularia parvifolia
- Ligularia pavlovii
- Ligularia persica
- Ligularia petelotii
- Ligularia petiolaris
- Ligularia phoenicochaeta
- Ligularia phyllocolea
- Ligularia platyglossa
- Ligularia pleurocaulis
- Ligularia potaninii
- Ligularia przewalskii
- Ligularia pterodonta
- Ligularia purdomii
- Ligularia pyrifolia
- Ligularia retusa
- Ligularia robusta
- Ligularia rockiana
- Ligularia ruficoma
- Ligularia rumicifolia
- Ligularia sachalinensis
- Ligularia sagitta
- Ligularia schizopetala
- Ligularia schmidtii
- Ligularia sibirica
- Ligularia sichotensis
- Ligularia songarica
- Ligularia splendens
- Ligularia stenocephala
- Ligularia stenoglossa
- Ligularia subsagittata
- Ligularia subspicata
- Ligularia talassica
- Ligularia tenuicaulis
- Ligularia tenuipes
- Ligularia thomsonii
- Ligularia thyrsoidea
- Ligularia tissulaginea
- Ligularia tongkyukensis
- Ligularia tongolensis
- Ligularia transversifolia
- Ligularia trichocephala
- Ligularia tsangchanensis
- Ligularia veitchiana
- Ligularia vellerea
- Ligularia villosa
- Ligularia virgaurea
- Ligularia vorobievii
- Ligularia wilsoniana
- Ligularia xanthotricha
- Ligularia yoshizoeana
- Ligularia yunnanensis
- Ligularia zhouquensis

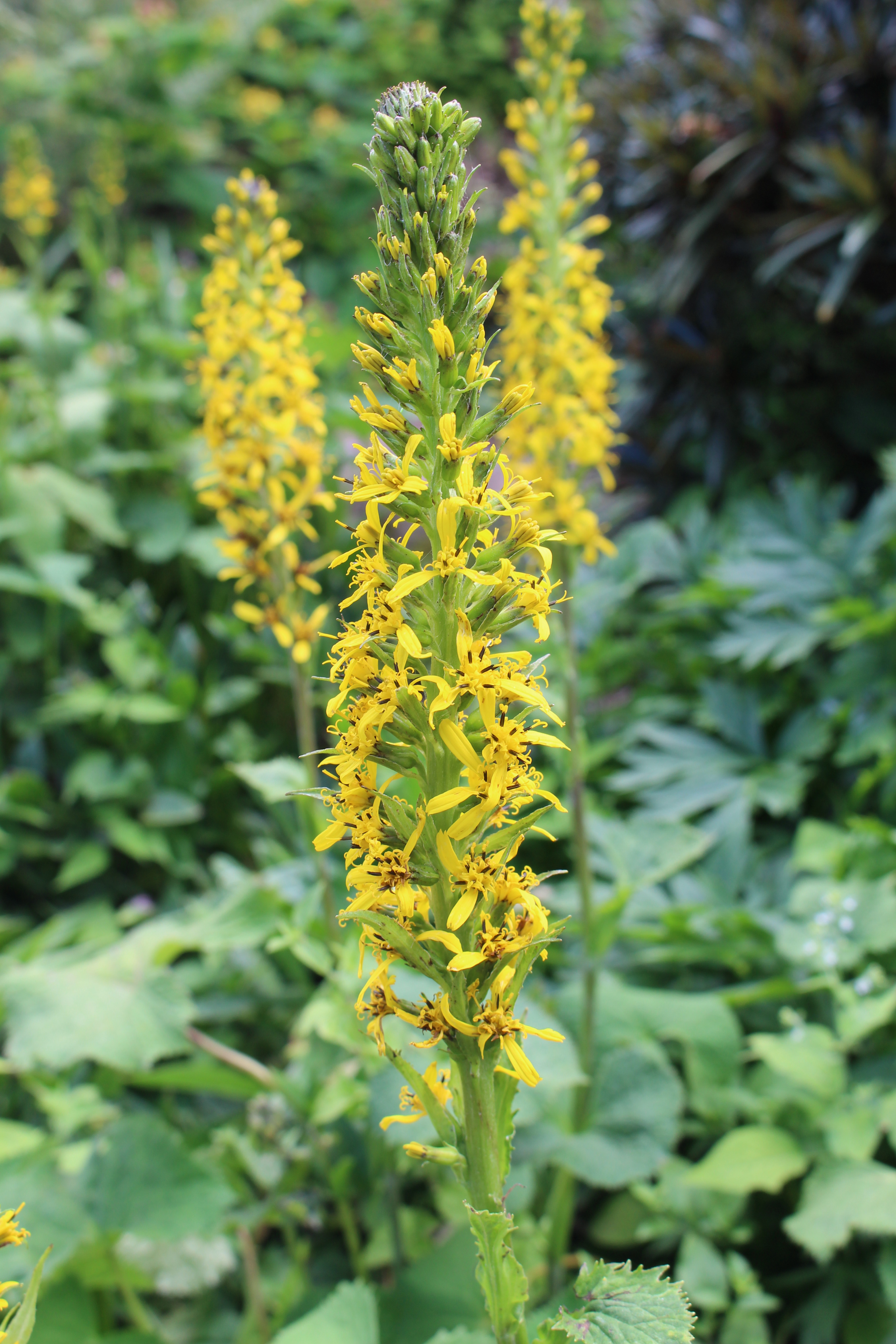
Ligularia alatipes
