= Gustav Fischer (explorer) =

German explorer (1848–1886)

Gustav Adolf Fischer
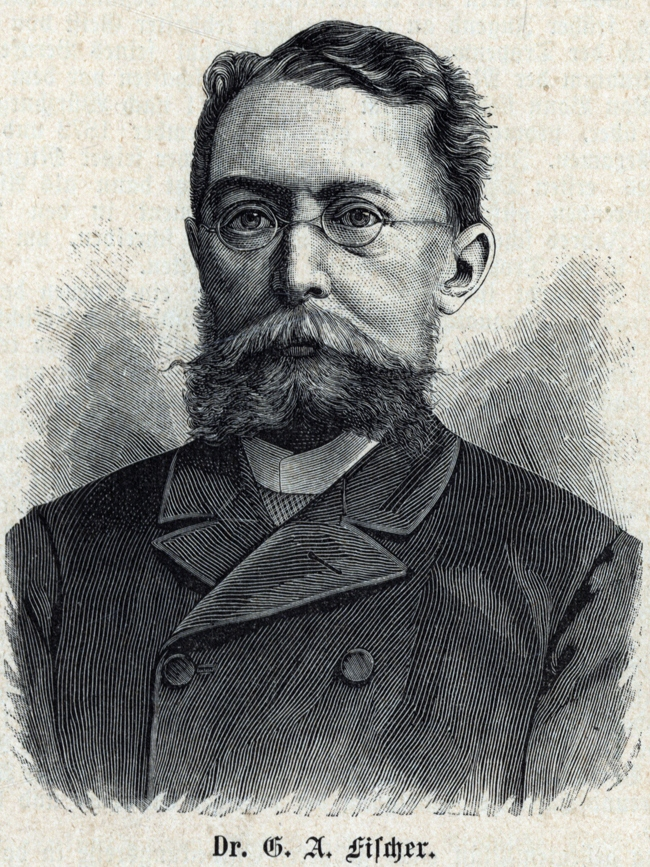
- Born: 3 March 1848; Barmen, North Rhine-Westphalia, German Confederation
- Died: 11 November 1886 (aged 38); Berlin, Kingdom of Prussia, German Empire

Gustav Adolf Fischer (3 March 1848 – 11 November 1886) was a German explorer of East Africa.

== Biography ==
Gustav Adolf Fischer was born in Barmen (now part of the city of Wuppertal) in Germany on 3 March 1848. He attended high school, first in his home town and then in Cologne. On leaving school in 1869 he studied medicine and natural sciences in Bonn, Berlin and then Würzburg where he obtained a doctorate. In 1874 he joined the 1st Garde Dragoon Regiment as a doctor and was assigned to the East Frisian Infantry Regiment garrisoned in Emden.

In 1876 he accompanied Clemens Denhardt's expedition to Zanzibar, where he settled and worked as a medical doctor. In the following year he explored Wituland and the southern Oromo country. In 1878 he continued his journey in Kenya along the Tana River to Masabubu.

With the support of the Geographic Society in Hamburg he visited the Maasai country in 1882 and penetrated from the mouth of the Pangani River to Lake Naivasha. The Maasai prevented him from advancing further. Equipped with funds by the brother of Wilhelm Junker, an explorer, who with Emin Pasha and Gaetano Casati had been lost in the equatorial provinces, he organized a relief expedition which, however, was compelled to return after reaching Lake Victoria. Shortly after his return to Germany in 1886 he died of a bilious fever contracted during his journey.

During the ten years that he spent in Africa, Fischer collected many bird specimens. The descriptions of new species were usually published together with Anton Reichenow who worked at the Natural History Museum of Berlin.

He is commemorated in the names of a number of birds, including Fischer's turaco (Tauraco fischeri), Fischer's lovebird, (Agapornis fischeri), Fischer's greenbul (Phyllastrephus fischeri) and Fischer's starling (Lamprotornis fischeri). He is also commemorated in the names of several plants, including Gutenbergia rueppellii var. fischeri and Ligularia fischeri (Fischer's ragwort). He is also commemorated by Fischer's Tower, a volcanic plug in Hell's Gate National Park by the shores of Lake Naivasha.

== Works ==
- Fischer, G.A. (1884). "Dr. Fischer's journey in the Masai Country". Proceedings of the Royal Geographical Society. 6 (2): 76–83. doi:10.2307/1800440. JSTOR 1800440.
- Fischer, G.A. (1885). Mehr Licht im dunklen Weltteil. Betrachtungen über die Kolonisation des tropischen Afrika unter besonderer Berücksichtigung des Sansibar-Gebiets (in German). Hamburg: L. Friederichsen.
- Fischer, G.A. (1885). "Bericht Über die im Auftrage der Geographischen Gesellschaft in Hamburg unternommene Reise in das Massai-Land. I. Allgemeiner Bericht". Mitteilungen der Geographischen Gesellschaft in Hamburg. 5: 36–99.
- Fischer, G.A. (1885). "Bericht Über die im Auftrage der Geographischen Gesellschaft in Hamburg unternommene Reise in das Massai-Land. II Begleitworte zur Original- Routenkarte Tafel VII". Mitteilungen der Geographischen Gesellschaft in Hamburg. 5: 189–237.

He also wrote many articles that were published in the Journal für Ornithologie.
