= Gutenbergia =

Scientific classification
- Kingdom: Plantae
- Clade: Tracheophytes
- Clade: Angiosperms
- Clade: Eudicots
- Clade: Asterids
- Order: Asterales
- Family: Asteraceae
- Subfamily: Cichorioideae
- Tribe: Vernonieae
- Genus: Gutenbergia; Sch.Bip. 1840 not Wald., 1848 (Rubiaceae)

Type species
- Gutenbergia rueppellii Sch.Bip.

Synonyms
- Erlangea sect. Platylepis S.Moore

Genus of flowering plants

Gutenbergia is a genus of African flowering plants in the family Asteraceae.

Species

- Gutenbergia abyssinica Sch.Bip.
- Gutenbergia adenocarpa Wech.
- Gutenbergia babatiensis C.Jeffrey
- Gutenbergia benguelensis Muschl.
- Gutenbergia boranensis (S.Moore) M.G.Gilbert
- Gutenbergia cordifolia Benth. ex Oliv.
- Gutenbergia eylesii (S.Moore) Wild & G.V.Pope
- Gutenbergia fruticosa (O.Hoffm.) C.Jeffrey
- Gutenbergia gilbertii C.Jeffrey
- Gutenbergia gossweileri S.Moore
- Gutenbergia kassneri S.Moore
- Gutenbergia leiocarpa O.Hoffm.
- Gutenbergia longipedicellata Wech.
- Gutenbergia mweroensis Wild & G.V.Pope
- Gutenbergia nivea Hutch. & B.L.Burtt
- Gutenbergia oppositifolia O.Hoffm. & Muschl.
- Gutenbergia pembensis S.Moore
- Gutenbergia petersii Steetz
- Gutenbergia polycephala Oliv. & Hiern
- Gutenbergia polytrichotoma Wech.
- Gutenbergia pubescens (S.Moore) C.Jeffrey
- Gutenbergia pumila Chiov.
- Gutenbergia rueppellii Sch.Bip.
- Gutenbergia somalensis (O.Hoffm.) M.G.Gilbert
- Gutenbergia spermacoceoides Wild & G.V.Pope
- Gutenbergia trifolia Wild & G.V.Pope
- Gutenbergia westii (Wild) Wild & G.V.Pope
