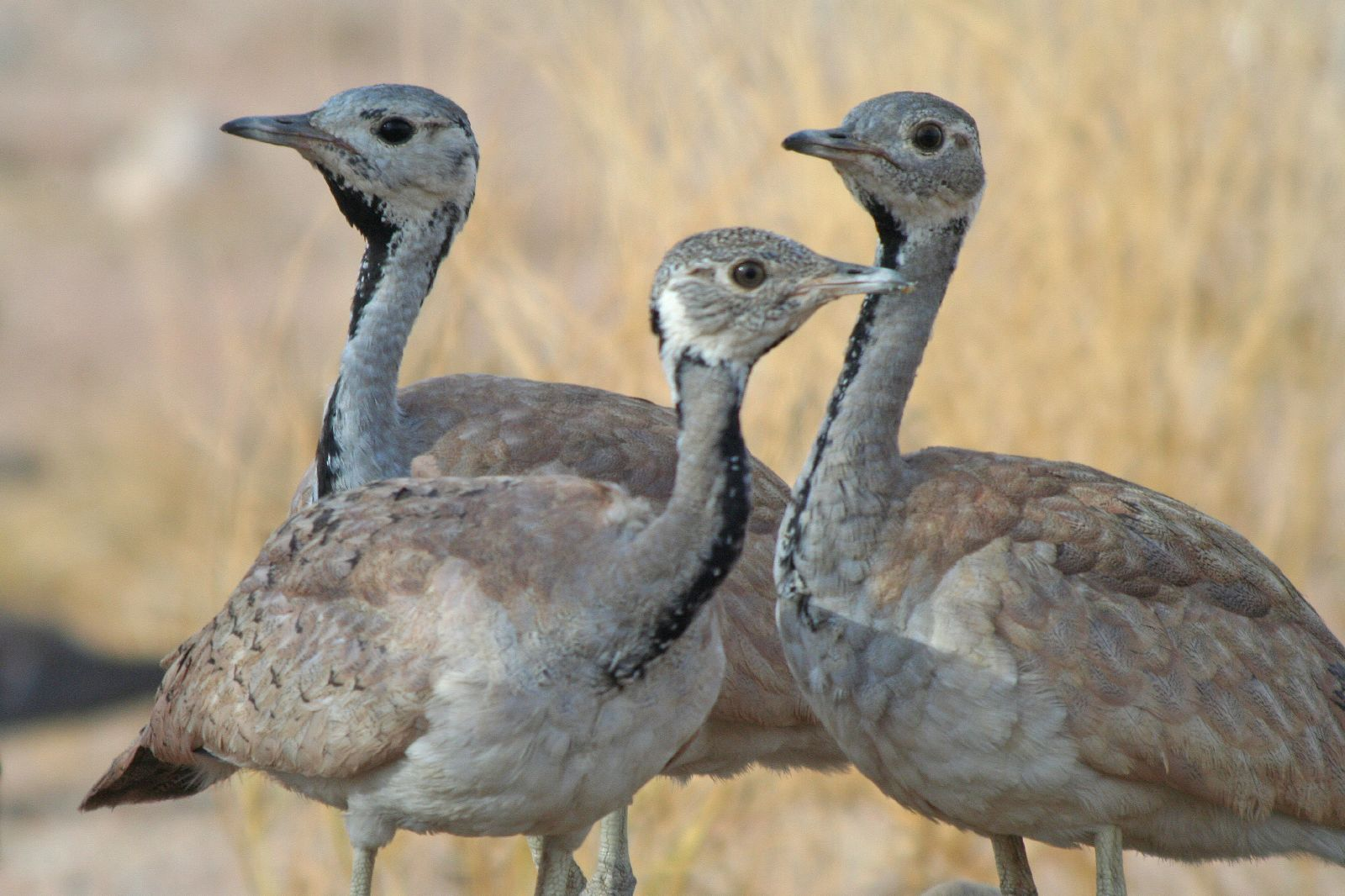
- A group of Rüppell's bustards

Scientific classification
- Domain: Eukaryota
- Kingdom: Animalia
- Phylum: Chordata
- Class: Aves
- Order: Otidiformes
- Family: Otididae
- Genus: Heterotetrax; Sharpe, 1894

= Heterotetrax =

Genus of birds

Heterotetrax is a genus of bird in the bustard family Otididae. It contains the three species, all restricted to Africa.

== Species ==
Genus Heterotetrax – Sharpe, 1894 – three species
Common name	Scientific name and subspecies	Range	Size and ecology	IUCN status and estimated population
Karoo korhaan	Heterotetrax vigorsii (Smith, 1831) Two subspecies: H. v. vigorsii; H. v. namaqua (Roberts, 1932)	Southern Africa.	Size: Habitat: Diet:	LC
Rüppell's korhaan	Heterotetrax rueppelii (Wahlberg, 1856)	Namibia	Size: Habitat: Diet:	LC
Little brown bustard	Heterotetrax humilis (Blyth, 1855)	Ethiopia and Somalia	Size: Habitat: Diet:	NT
