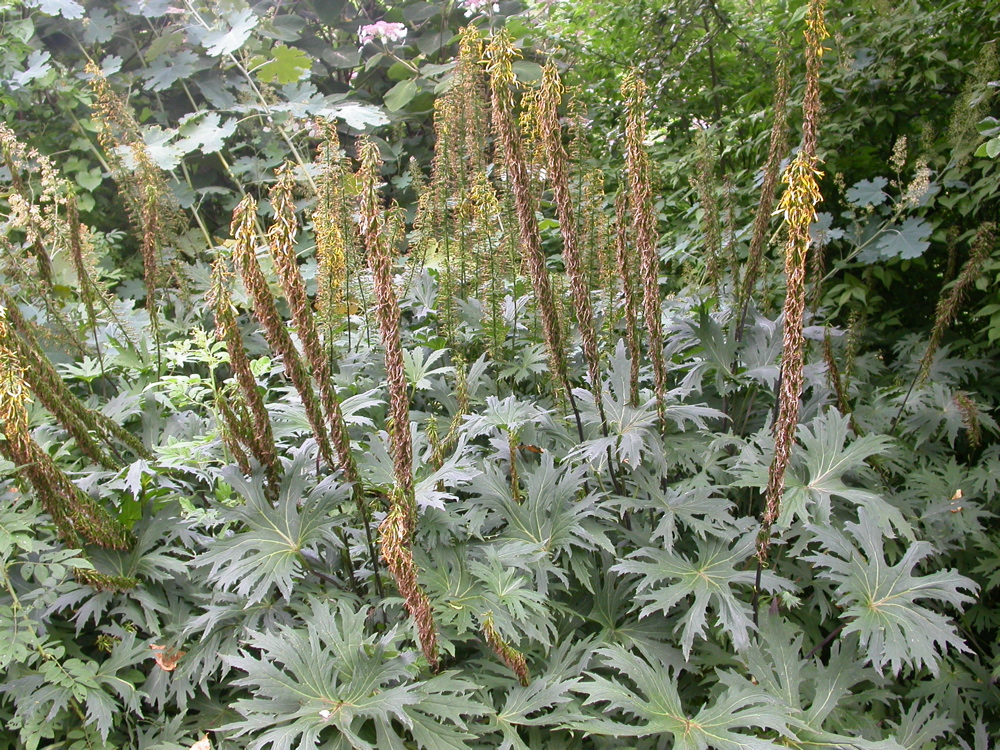

Scientific classification
- Kingdom: Plantae
- Clade: Tracheophytes
- Clade: Angiosperms
- Clade: Eudicots
- Clade: Asterids
- Order: Asterales
- Family: Asteraceae
- Genus: Ligularia
- Species: L. przewalskii

Binomial name
- Ligularia przewalskii (Maxim.) Diels

Synonyms
- Senecio przewalskii Maxim.

= Ligularia przewalskii =

Species of flowering plant

Ligularia przewalskii, also called Przewalski's leopardplant and Przewalski's golden ray, is a species of perennial herbaceous plant in the genus Ligularia and the family Asteraceae, native to damp places in Mongolia and Northern China. Named after the Russian explorer Nikolai Przhevalsky, it used to be called Senecio przewalskii Maxim.

Growing to a height of 1.5–2 m (4.9–6.6 ft), Przewalski's ligularia is a popular ornamental plant cultivated for its large, deeply cut foliage and tall spike-like inflorescences with bright yellow composite flowers. It blooms in summer, from July to August.

In China, Ligularia przewalskii is known as a medicinal plant. Its roots contain thirteen compounds, some with antibacterial activity.

== Cultivation ==
Plants grow best under cool, moist conditions, and resent hot sunny locations where they wilt extensively. They are propagated from seed or by cutting up the crowns.

The cultivar 'The Rocket' is a recipient of the Royal Horticultural Society's Award of Garden Merit.
