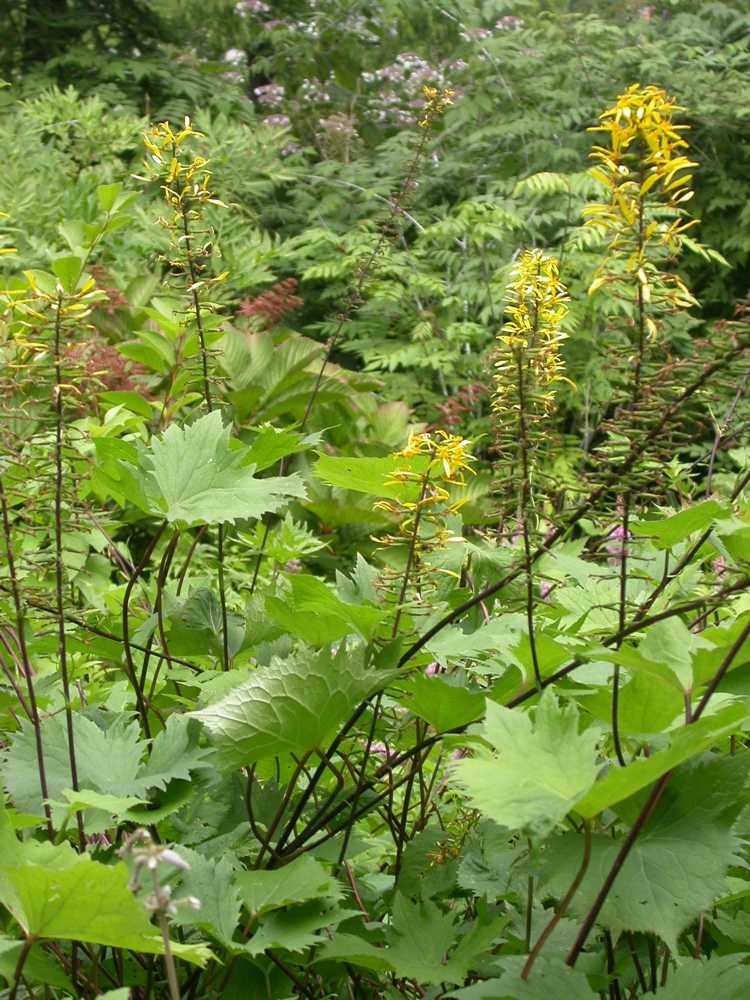

Scientific classification
- Kingdom: Plantae
- Clade: Tracheophytes
- Clade: Angiosperms
- Clade: Eudicots
- Clade: Asterids
- Order: Asterales
- Family: Asteraceae
- Genus: Ligularia
- Species: L. stenocephala

Binomial name
- Ligularia stenocephala (Maxim.) Matsum. & Koidz.

Synonyms
- Senecio stenocephalus Maxim.

= Ligularia stenocephala =

Species of flowering plant

Ligularia stenocephala is a species of the genus Ligularia and the family Asteraceae. It used to be Senecio.
