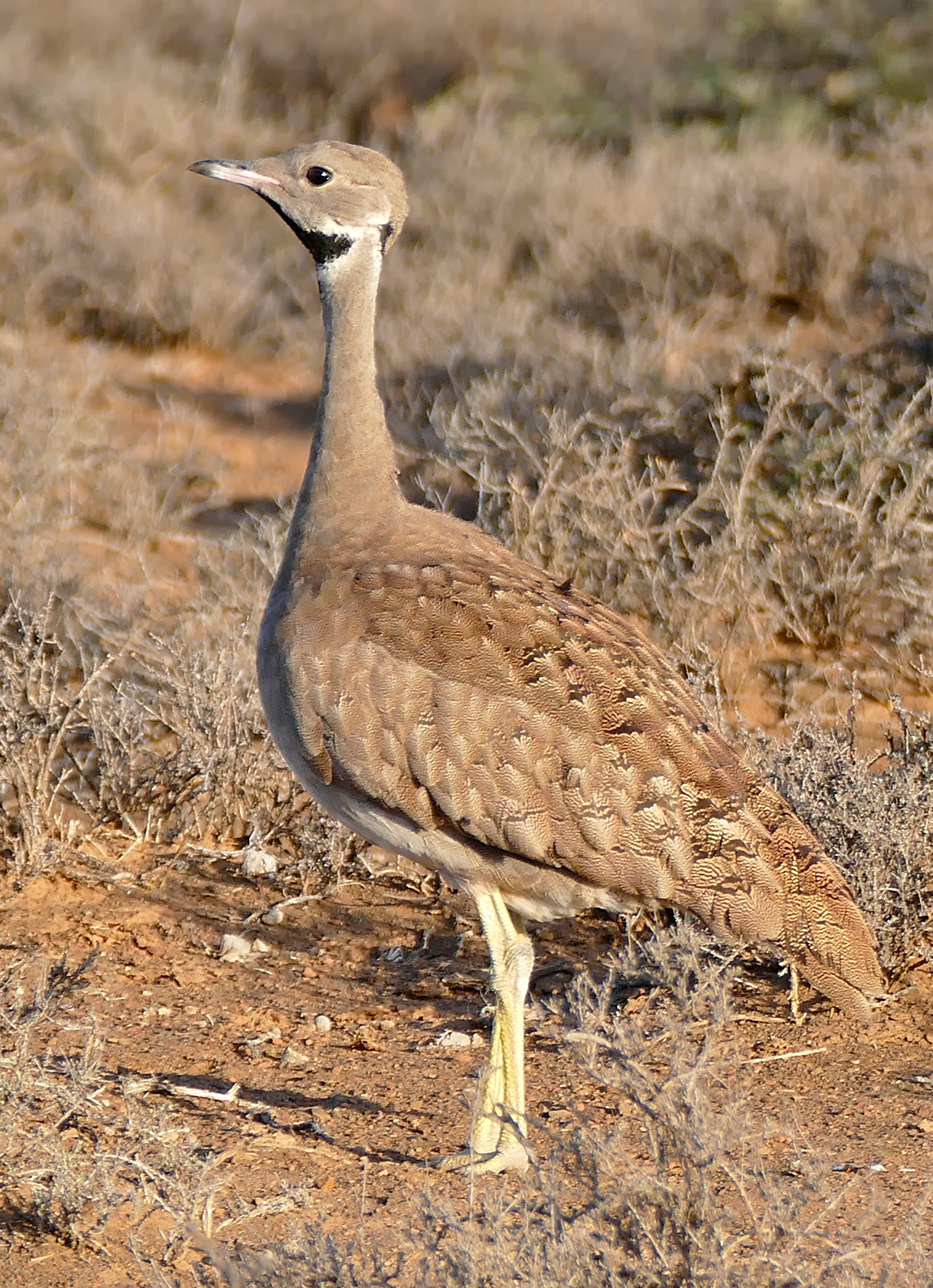
- Adult bird at Camdeboo National Park

Conservation status
- Least Concern (IUCN 3.1)
- CITES Appendix II

Scientific classification
- Kingdom: Animalia
- Phylum: Chordata
- Class: Aves
- Order: Otidiformes
- Family: Otididae
- Genus: Heterotetrax
- Species: H. vigorsii

Binomial name
- Heterotetrax vigorsii (Smith, 1831)
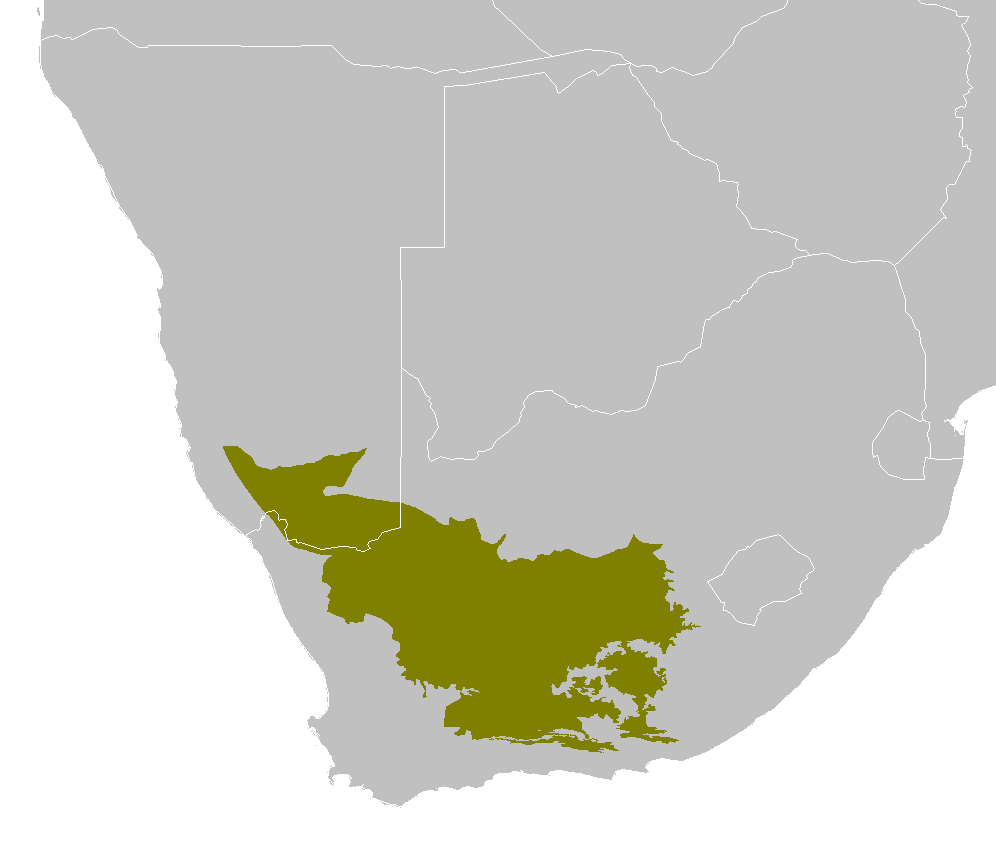
- general range, the Nama Karoo

Synonyms
- Eupodotis vigorsii

= Karoo korhaan =

Species of bird

The karoo korhaan (Heterotetrax vigorsii), also known as karoo bustard, is a species of bird in the bustard family, Otididae, from Southern Africa. There are two subspecies, the nominate race, from south-eastern South Africa, and H. v. namaqua (Roberts, 1932), from north-western South Africa and southern Namibia.

The karoo korhaan lives in a range of arid habitats associated with the karoo and other arid scrubland habitats found in western South Africa and Namibia. It is also found in slightly denser scrubland, preferring habitat with cover ranging from 10 to 50 cm (3.9–20 in) off the ground. A small population can also be found in karoo-like fynbos habitat in the Western Cape province.

The karoo korhaan is a small bustard, 60 cm (24 in). Males are larger and heavier, weighing 1,600 g (56 oz) compared to the female's 1,350 g (48 oz). The head, neck and breast of the nominate subspecies is grey-brown, with a black chin and throat edged in white. The belly is pinkish white, and the wings are brown. The female is similar to the male but has less black on the throat. The neck and breast of the subspecies E. v. namaqua is greyer compared to the nominate subspecies.

Karoo korhaans are omnivorous, but plant material is dominant in their diet. Flowers, fruit, leaves and corms all being taken. In particular, flowers from Asteraceae, Brassicaceae and Mesembryanthemaceae are all seasonally important.

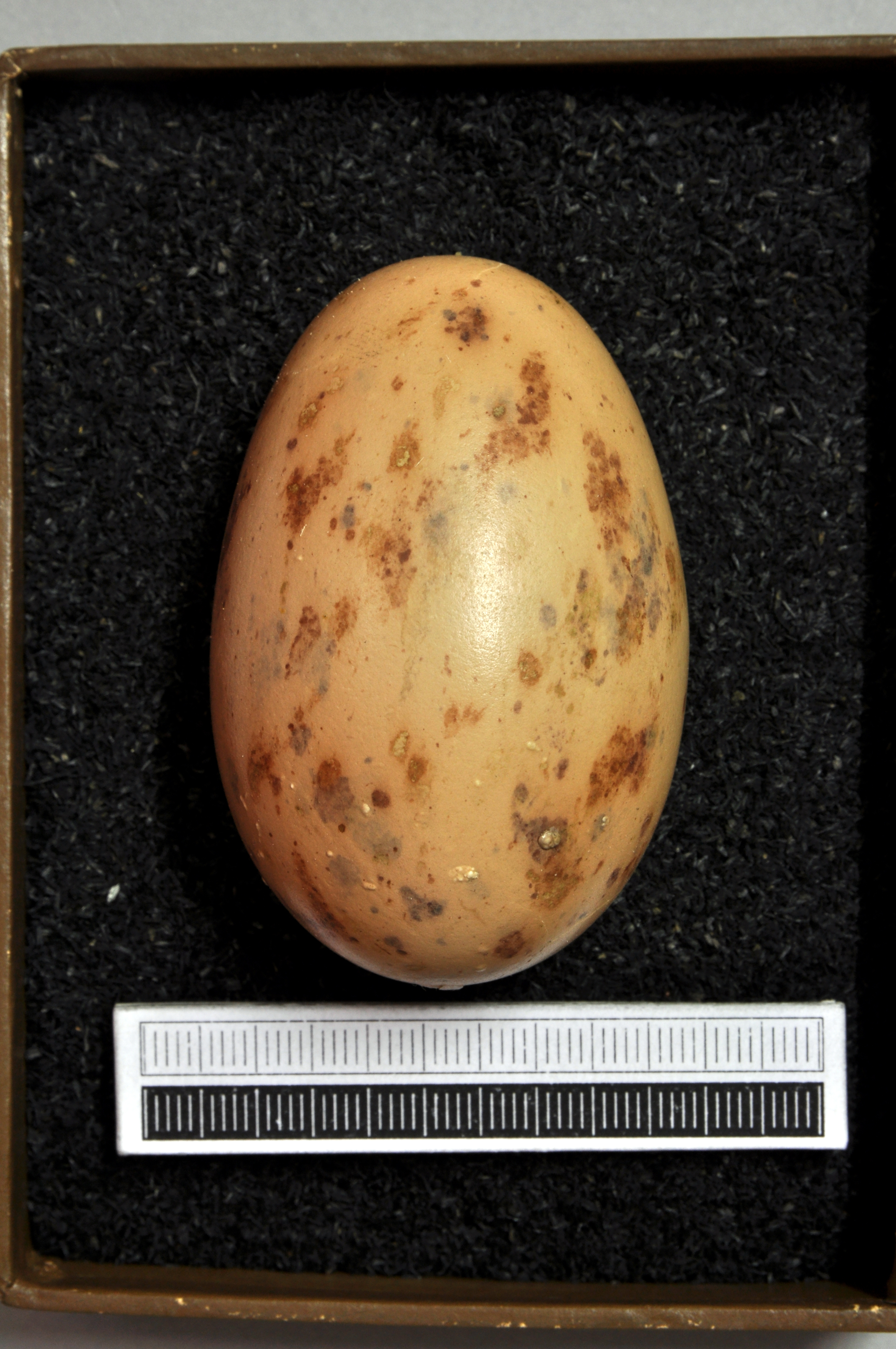
Egg, Collection Museum Wiesbaden

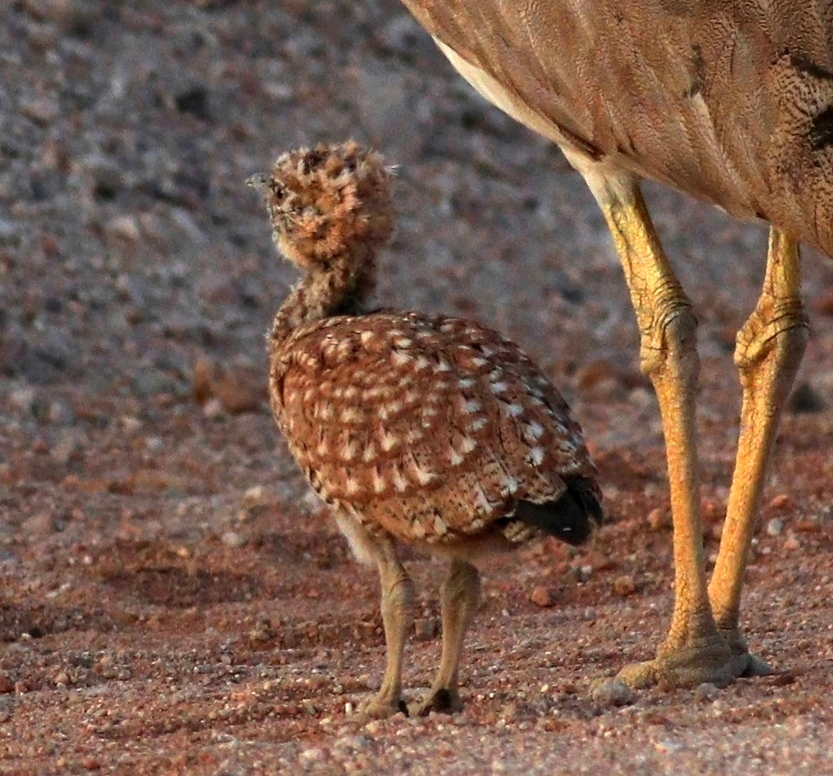
Chick accompanied by adult in Karas Region, southern Namibia
