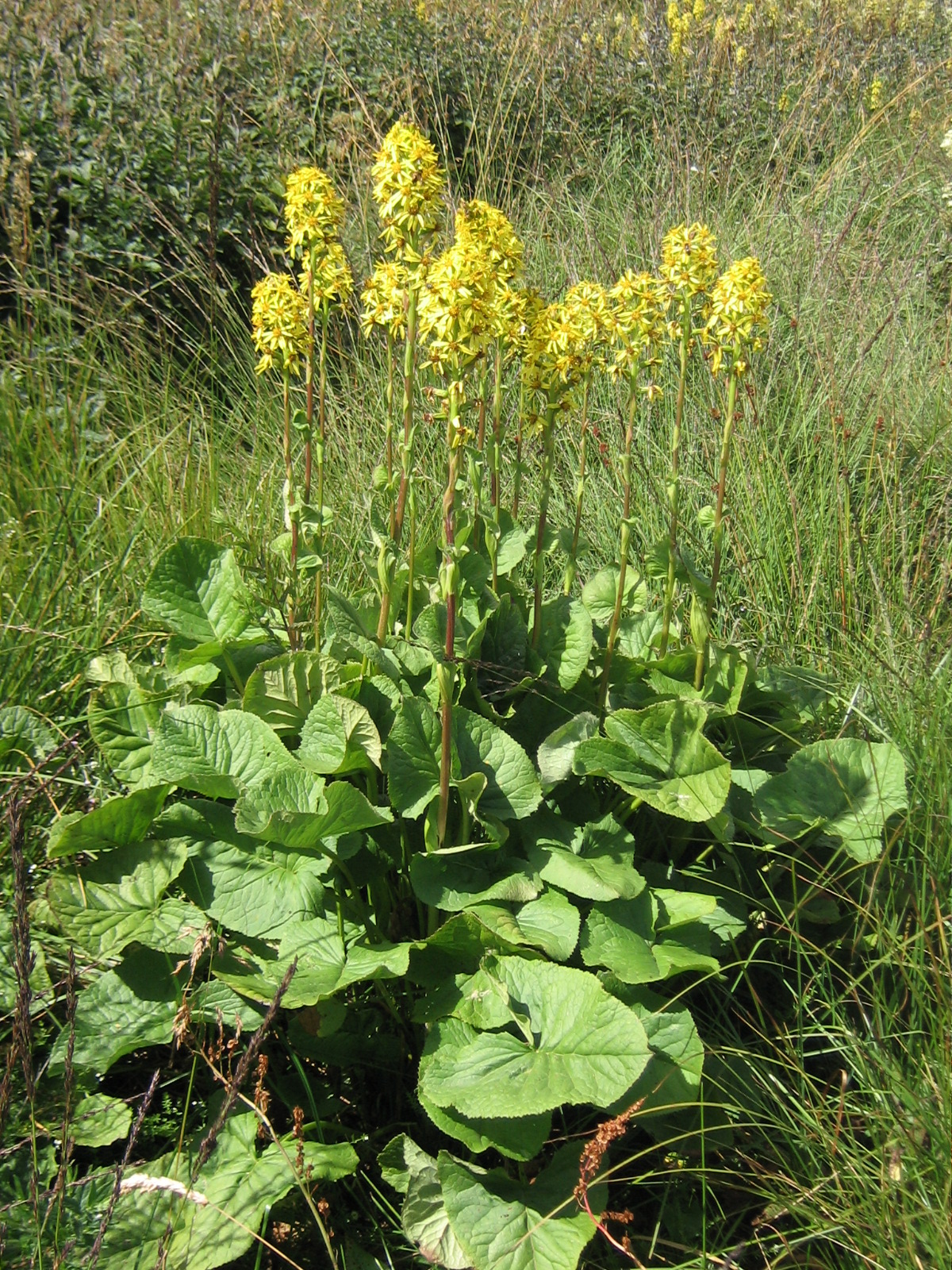

Scientific classification
- Kingdom: Plantae
- Clade: Tracheophytes
- Clade: Angiosperms
- Clade: Eudicots
- Clade: Asterids
- Order: Asterales
- Family: Asteraceae
- Genus: Ligularia
- Species: L. sibirica

Binomial name
- Ligularia sibirica (L.) Cass.

Synonyms
- Cineraria sibirica (L.) L. Senecio ligularia Hook. f. Senecio sibiricus (L.) L. f. Senecio cacaliifolius Sch. Bip.

= Ligularia sibirica =

Species of flowering plant

Ligularia sibirica is the type species for the genus Ligularia. It is a 0.3-1.3 m tall perennial herbaceous plant, native to fens and damp grassy meadows in Siberia, Central and Eastern Europe. Once fairly common, it has disappeared from many places in Europe, owing to drainage of wetlands and competition from other plants invading its natural habitats; when growing in shade plants do not flower or set seed very well and seed germination is greatly reduced. This species is sometimes grown in gardens for its large leaves and tall spike like arrangement of yellow daisy like flowers.
