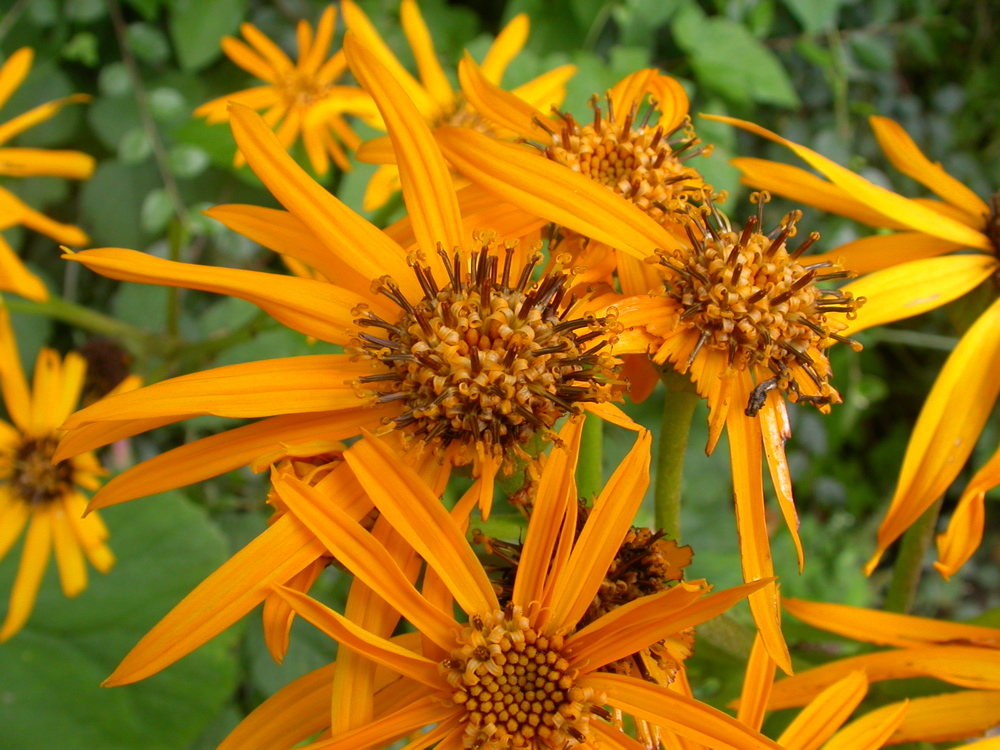

Scientific classification
- Kingdom: Plantae
- Clade: Tracheophytes
- Clade: Angiosperms
- Clade: Eudicots
- Clade: Asterids
- Order: Asterales
- Family: Asteraceae
- Genus: Ligularia
- Species: L. dentata

Binomial name
- Ligularia dentata (A.Gray) H.Hara

Synonyms BMG
- Senecio clivorum Maxim.; Erythrochaete dentata A. Gray; Ligularia clivorum Maxim.

= Ligularia dentata =

Species of flowering plant

Ligularia dentata, the summer ragwort or leopardplant, is a species of flowering plant in the genus Ligularia and the family Asteraceae, native to China and Japan.

== Description ==
It is a robust herbaceous perennial growing to 1–1.5 m (3–5 ft) tall by 1 m (3 ft) wide. The dark green leaves are large, long-stalked, leathery, cordate-based, and very rounded, with serrated edges (hence the Latin dentata meaning "toothed") . Orange-yellow daisy-like composite flowers bloom on thick red, mostly leafless stalks, rising above the foliage in early summer.

== Cultivation ==
Ligularia dentata is grown as an ornamental plant, chosen as much for its bold foliage as its flowers. It is used as a round-leaved accent plant or massed planting in moist sun and partial shade garden settings, and in containers. Cultivars include 'Desdemona' and 'Othello'. Selections with cream coloured spotted foliage (polka dots) are also grown.

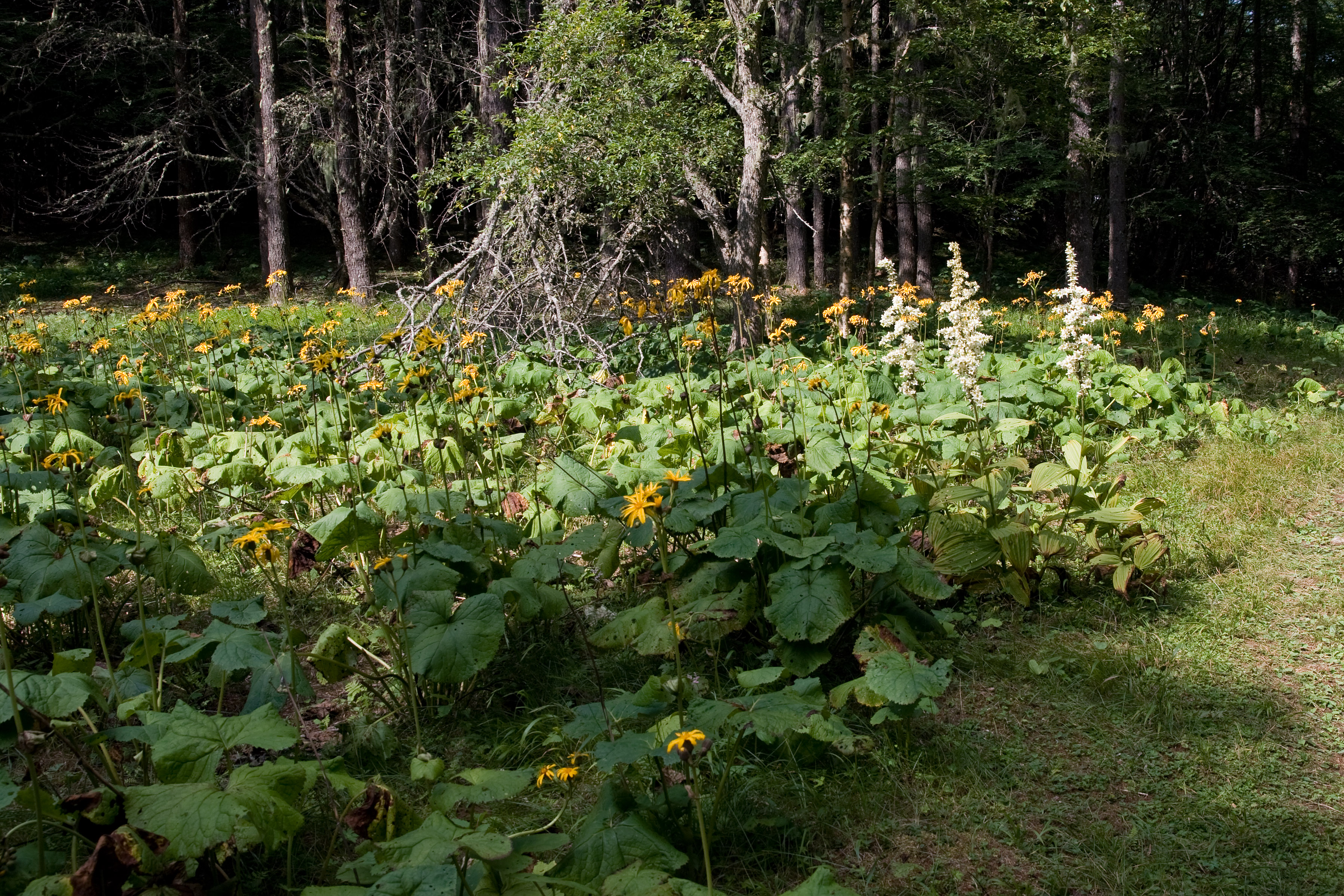

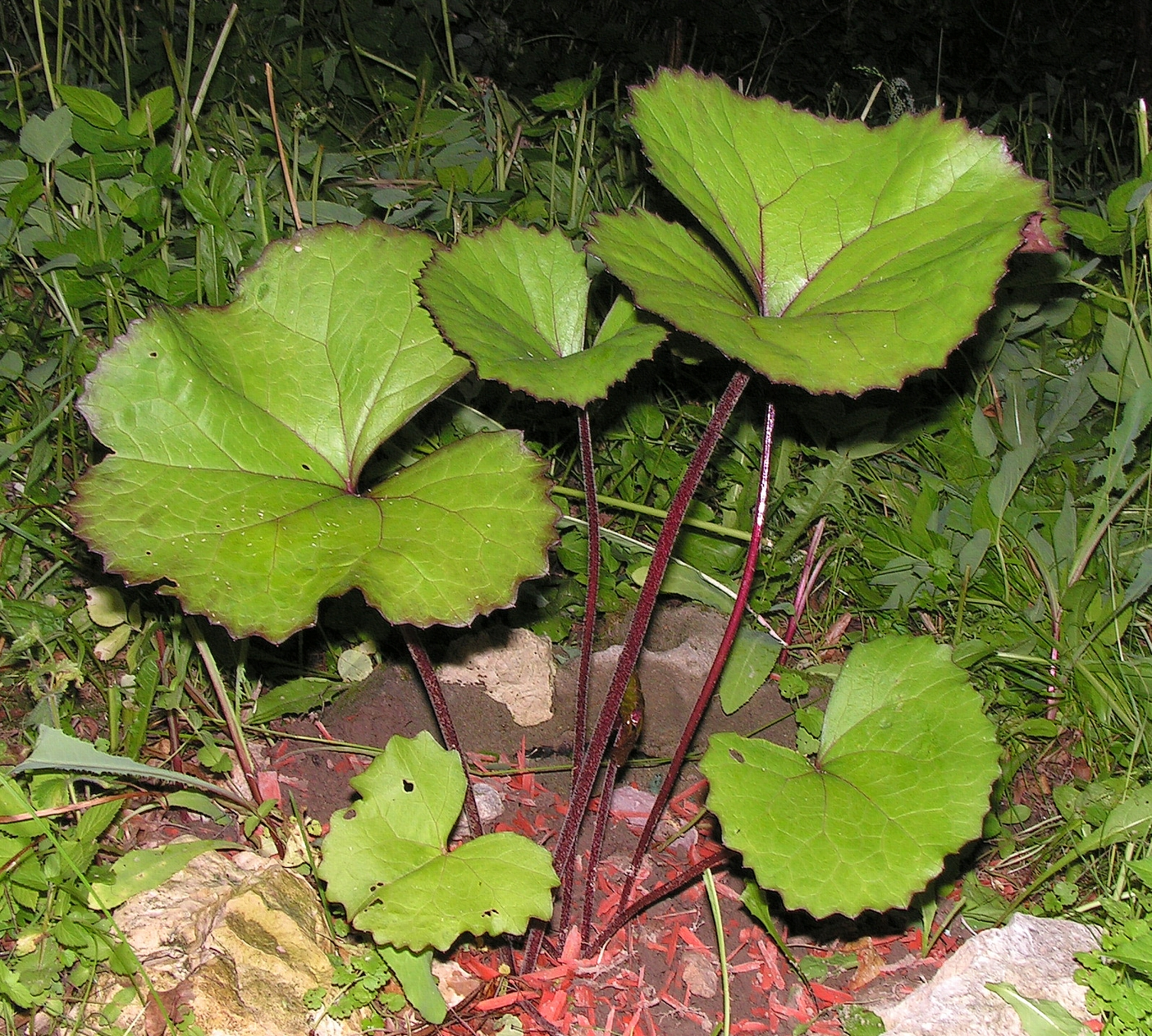
'Desdemona'

== See also ==
- Farfugium japonicum
