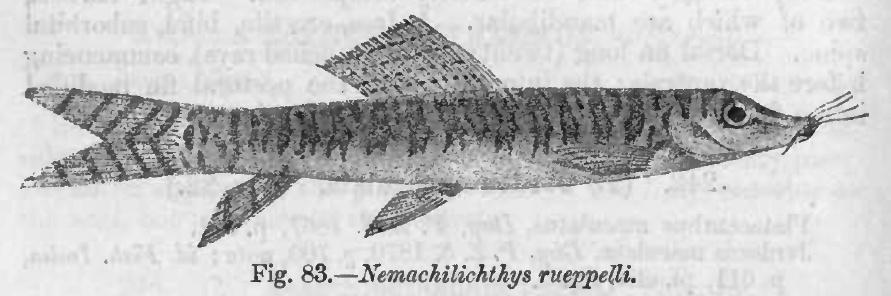

Conservation status
- Least Concern (IUCN 3.1)

Scientific classification
- Kingdom: Animalia
- Phylum: Chordata
- Class: Actinopterygii
- Order: Cypriniformes
- Family: Nemacheilidae
- Genus: Nemachilichthys; Day, 1878
- Species: N. rueppelli

Binomial name
- Nemachilichthys rueppelli (Sykes, 1839)

Synonyms
- Cobitis rueppelli Sykes, 1839; Nemacheilus rueppelli (Sykes, 1839); Mesonoemacheilus rueppelli (Sykes, 1839); Noemacheilus rueppelli (Sykes, 1839); Nemachilichthys shimogensis Narayan Rao, 1920; Nemacheilus shimogensis (Narayan Rao, 1920)

= Nemachilichthys =

Genus of fishes

Nemachilichthys is a monospecific genus of freshwater ray-finned fish belonging to the family Nemacheilidae, the stone loaches. The only species in the genus is Nemachilichthys rueppelli, the mongoose loach or Shimoga loach, a species endemic to the Western Ghats in Karnataka and Maharashtra.

== Taxonomy ==
Nemachilichthys was first proposed as a monospecific genus in 1878 by the British ichthyologist Francis Day with Cobitis rueppelli. Cobitis ruepelli was first formally described in 1839 by the English naturalist William Henry Sykes with its type locality given as Deccan in India. In 1920 C. R. Narayan Rao described a new species, Nemachilichthys shimogensis with its type locality given as the Thunga River at Shimoga Town in Mysore, India. Recent evidence shows that there is only a marginal raw mitochondrial genetic distance between Nemachilichthys shimogensis and N. ruppelli. Although morphometric difference occur at the population level, Keskar et al. conclude that there are no significant differences separating the two species. Therefore they treat N. shimogensis as a synonym of N. ruppelli. The Eschmeyer's Catalog of Fishes follows this treatment. This taxon is included in the family Nemacheilidae which is within the suborder Cobitoidei of the order Cypriniformes.

== Distribution and habitat ==
Nemachilichthys has been reported from the Krishna River system in the Western Ghats, India. Specimen where found in the following rivers: Thunga, Mula-Mutha, Krishna River, Indrayani, Hiranyakeshi, Nira River and Koyna. It lives in moderate to fast-flowing rivers, usually on the bed. N. ruppelli prefers mud, small rocks, silt and pebbles. It frequently occurs in association with submerged roots of riparian plants and aquatic vegetation.
