= 2026–27 ES Sétif season =

ES Sétif
2026–27 season
- Owner: Sonelgaz
- Head coach: Hamada Sedki (from 1 July 2026) (until 26 October 2026); Lassaad Chabbi (from 17 November 2026)
- Stadium: 8 May 1945 Stadium
- Ligue 1: 10th
- Algerian Cup: Round of 64

The 2026–27 season, is ES Sétif's 56th and the club's 25th consecutive season in the top flight of Algerian football. In addition to the domestic league, ES Sétif are participating in this season's editions of the Algerian Cup.

== Squad list ==
Players and squad numbers last updated on 31 August 2026.
Note: Flags indicate national team as has been defined under FIFA eligibility rules. Players may hold more than one non-FIFA nationality.

No.	Nat.	Name	Position	Date of Birth (Age)	Signed from
Goalkeepers
1	(Algeria)	Alexandre Oukidja	GK	19 July 1988 (aged 38)	(Algeria) Free agent
16	(Algeria)	Zakaria Saidi	GK	5 August 1996 (aged 30)	(Algeria) JS Saoura
30	(Algeria)	Zakaria Trad	GK	19 May 2006 (aged 20)	(Algeria) Youth team
Defenders
3	(Algeria)	Issam Naim	CB	21 December 2005 (aged 20)	(Algeria) CR Belouizdad
4	(Jordan)	Hadi Al-Hourani	CB	14 March 2000 (aged 26)	(Jordan) Al-Faisaly SC
5	(Algeria)	Aïssa Boudechicha	LB	13 April 2000 (aged 26)	(Algeria) MC El Bayadh
12	(Algeria)	Chemseddine Lakehal	CB	29 February 2000 (aged 26)	(Algeria) ES Ben Aknoun
13	(Gabon)	Mick Omfia	CB	10 December 2000 (aged 25)	(Guinea) Hafia FC
19	(Algeria)	Anis Khemaissia	LB	27 January 1999 (aged 27)	(Libya) Al Hilal SC
21	(Algeria)	Amine Zenadji	RB	24 July 1997 (aged 29)	(Luxembourg) FC UNA Strassen
23	(Algeria)	Slimane Bouteldja	CB	30 March 1995 (aged 31)	(Algeria) Olympique Akbou
27	(Algeria)	Kamel Hamidi	RB	1 May 1996 (aged 30)	(Algeria) MC Alger
Midfielders
6	(Algeria)	Idris Messahel	DM	24 February 2006 (aged 20)	(Algeria) Youth team
8	(Algeria)	Mohamed Hamek	CM	28 April 1998 (aged 28)	(France) Aubagne
10	(Algeria)	Larbi Tabti	AM	23 April 1993 (aged 33)	(Algeria) MC Alger
15	(Algeria)	Abderrahmane Boungab	AM	25 May 2006 (aged 20)	(Algeria) Youth team
22	(Algeria)	Dalil Hassen Khodja	CM	3 April 1999 (aged 27)	(Algeria) ASO Chlef
25	(Algeria)	Salim Akkal	DM	17 February 2000 (aged 26)	(France) Le Puy FC
26	(Algeria)	Mohamed Reda Boumechra	AM	3 June 1997 (aged 29)	(Algeria) USM Khenchela
29	(Ghana)	Salifu Mudasiru	DM	1 April 1997 (aged 29)	(Uzbekistan) FC Mash'al
Forwards
7	(Algeria)	Mohamed Islam Belkhir	LW	16 March 2001 (aged 25)	(Algeria) CR Belouizdad
9	(Algeria)	Riad Benayad	ST	2 November 1996 (aged 29)	(Algeria) USM Alger
11	(Jordan)	Yousef Abu Jalboush	RW	15 June 1998 (aged 28)	(Jordan) Al-Hussein
17	(Algeria)	Mohamed Boukerma	RW	5 August 2001 (aged 25)	(Algeria) Paradou AC
18	(Algeria)	Zakaria Benchaâ	ST	12 June 1997 (aged 29)	(Kuwait) Al-Fahaheel SC
20	(Algeria)	Merouane Zerrouki	ST	25 January 2001 (aged 26)	(Algeria) CR Belouizdad
24	(Algeria)	Imadeddine Bouchagoura	LW	24 October 2006 (aged 19)	(Algeria) Youth team

== Transfers ==
=== In ===
==== Summer ====
Date	Pos	Player	Moving from	Fee	Source
15 June 2026	AM	(Algeria) Larbi Tabti	MC Alger	Free transfer	
15 June 2026	AM	(Algeria) Mohamed Reda Boumechra	USM Khenchela	Free transfer	
15 June 2026	LW	(Algeria) Mohamed Islam Belkhir	CR Belouizdad	Free transfer	
15 June 2026	LB	(Algeria) Anis Khemaissia	(Libya) Al Hilal SC	Free transfer	
15 June 2026	CB	(Algeria) Slimane Bouteldja	Olympique Akbou	Free transfer	
15 June 2026	GK	(Algeria) Zakaria Trad	Youth team	First Professional Contract	
15 June 2026	DM	(Algeria) Idris Messahel	Youth team	First Professional Contract	
15 June 2026	AM	(Algeria) Abderrahmane Boungab	Youth team	First Professional Contract	
15 June 2026	LW	(Algeria) Imadeddine Bouchagoura	Youth team	First Professional Contract	
9 July 2026	ST	(Algeria) Zakaria Benchaâ	(Kuwait) Al-Fahaheel SC	Free transfer	
9 July 2026	CM	(Algeria) Dalil Hassen Khodja	ASO Chlef	Free transfer	
16 July 2026	DM	(Algeria) Salim Akkal	(France) Le Puy FC	Free transfer	
20 July 2026	CB	(Jordan) Hadi Al-Hourani	(Jordan) Al-Faisaly SC	Free transfer	
26 July 2026	GK	(Algeria) Alexandre Oukidja	Unattached	Free transfer	
1 August 2026	CB	(Algeria) Chemseddine Lakehal	ES Ben Aknoun	Free transfer	
9 August 2026	RW	(Jordan) Yousef Abu Jalboush	(Jordan) Al-Hussein	Free transfer	
19 August 2026	RB	(Algeria) Amine Zenadji	(Luxembourg) FC UNA Strassen	Free transfer	
27 August 2026	ST	(Algeria) Riad Benayad	USM Alger	Free transfer	

=== Out ===
==== Summer ====
Date	Pos	Player	Moving to	Fee	Source
7 June 2026	GK	(Algeria) Hatem Bencheikh El Fegoun	Olympique Akbou	Loan return	
15 July 2026	RB	(Algeria) Adda Derder	MB Rouissat	Free transfer	
19 July 2026	CB	(Algeria) Youcef Douar	USM Khenchela	Free transfer	
19 July 2026	CB	(Algeria) Imadeddine Boubekeur	USM Khenchela	Free transfer	
22 July 2026	AM	(Algeria) Akram Djahnit	Unattached	Free transfer (Released)	
22 July 2026	CB	(Algeria) Ibrahim Bekakchi	Unattached	Free transfer (Released)	
22 July 2026	DM	(Algeria) Abderraouf Arib	Unattached	Free transfer (Released)	
22 July 2026	RW	(Republic of the Congo) Wilfrid Nkaya	Unattached	Free transfer (Released)	
22 July 2026	ST	(Ivory Coast) Daniel Gnahoua	Unattached	Free transfer (Released)	
28 July 2026	ST	(Algeria) Oussama Bouguerri	JS Saoura	Free transfer	
1 August 2026	DM	(Algeria) Oussama Daibeche	JS Saoura	Free transfer	
2 August 2026	AM	(Algeria) Kheireddine Toual	(Egypt) Al Masry SC	Undisclosed	
5 August 2026	ST	(Algeria) Mohamed Benlebna	MB Rouissat	Free transfer	

== Competitions ==
=== Overview ===
Competition	Record								Started round	Final position / round	First match	Last match
Competition	G	W	D	L	GF	GA	GD	Win %	Started round	Final position / round	First match	Last match
Ligue 1	9	2	4	3	11	9	+2	22.22	—N/a	To be confirmed	3 September 2026	In Progress
Algerian Cup	0	0	0	0	0	0	+0	—	Round of 64	To be confirmed	December 2026	In Progress
Total	9	2	4	3	11	9	+2	22.22				

Updated to match played 20 November 2026
Source: Competitions

=== Ligue 1 ===
==== League table ====
Pos	Team	Pld	W	D	L	GF	GA	GD	Pts
8	JS El Biar	10	3	3	4	13	12	+1	12
9	CR Témouchent	10	2	5	3	7	10	−3	11
10	ES Sétif	9	2	4	3	11	9	+2	10
11	CS Constantine	10	3	1	6	12	18	−6	10
12	ES Ben Aknoun	9	1	5	3	8	10	−2	8

Updated to match(es) played on 20 November 2026. Source: lfp.dz
Rules for classification: 1) Points; 2) Head-to-head points; 3) Head-to-head goal difference; 4) First half goal difference; 5) First half total goals; 6) Fairplay ranking; 7) Playoff.

==== Results summary ====
Overall								Home						Away					
Pld	W	D	L	GF	GA	GD	Pts	W	D	L	GF	GA	GD	W	D	L	GF	GA	GD
9	2	4	3	11	9	+2	10	1	3	2	9	7	+2	1	1	1	2	2	0

Last updated: 20 November 2026.
Source: Competitive matches

==== Results by round ====
Round	1	2	3	4	5	6	7	8	9	10	11	12	13	14	15	16	17	18	19	20	21	22	23	24	25	26	27	28	29	30
Ground	H	A	H	A	H	A	H	A	H	H	A	H	A	H	A	A	H	A	H	A	H	A	H	A	A	H	A	H	A	H
Result	L	L	W	D	D		L	W	D	D																				
Position																														

Updated to match(es) played on 20 November 2026. Source: Competitive matches
A = Away; H = Home; W = Win; D = Draw; L = Loss

==== Matches ====
The league fixtures were announced on 3 August 2026.

All times are local, WAT (UTC+1).

Win Draw Loss Postponed

3 September 2026 Round 1	ES Sétif	0–1	ES Ben Aknoun	Sétif
19:00		Flashscore; LFP	Adjout 78'	Stadium: 8 May 1945 Stadium; Referee: Alaa Bouab

11 September 2026 Round 2	CR Belouizdad	1–0	ES Sétif	Algiers
21:00	Bouzok 82' (pen.)	Flashscore; LFP		Stadium: Stade du 5 Juillet; Referee: Youcef Taieb Bouderbal

19 September 2026 Round 3	ES Sétif	5–1	CS Constantine	Sétif
19:00	Boumechra 37' (pen.); Benchaâ 71', 76'; Benayad 90+1'; Abu Jalboush 90+5'	Flashscore; LFP	Chikhi 1'	Stadium: 8 May 1945 Stadium; Referee: Yahia Dahar

8 October 2026 Round 4	MC Oran	0–0	ES Sétif	Bir El Djir
20:00		Flashscore; LFP		Stadium: Miloud Hadefi Stadium; Referee: Ayoub Belhachemi

14 October 2026 Round 5	ES Sétif	1–1	JS Kabylie	Sétif
18:00	Benayad 10'	Flashscore; LFP	Messaoudi 33'	Stadium: 8 May 1945 Stadium; Referee: Anes Azrine

24 October 2026 Round 7	ES Sétif	1–2	CR Témouchent	Sétif
19:00	Benayad 90+2'	[ehttps://www.flashscore.com/match/football/cr-temouchent-p0qAWcB9/es-setif-EDgC6qYp/?mid=Um4UzFU Flashscore] LFP	Zaalouk 15'; Baouche 83'	Stadium: 8 May 1945 Stadium; Referee: Haitham Ghouti

30 October 2026 Round 8	ASO Chlef	2–1	ES Sétif	Chlef
17:45	Motrani 45'	Flashscore; LFP	Benayad 3'; Bouchagoura 74'	Stadium: Mohamed Boumezrag Stadium; Referee: Mustapha Ghorbal

7 November 2026 Round 9	ES Sétif	1–1	MB Rouissat	Sétif
17:45	Tabti 53'	Flashscore; LFP	El Orfi 70' (pen.)	Stadium: 8 May 1945 Stadium; Referee: Alaa Bouab

20 November 2026 Round 10	ES Sétif	1–1	US Biskra	Sétif
17:00	Zerrouki 55' (pen.)	Flashscore; LFP	Belkhadem 32'	Stadium: 8 May 1945 Stadium; Referee: Tayeb Benyebka

30 November 2026 Round 11	USM Khenchela	–	ES Sétif	Khenchela
14:00		Flashscore; LFP		Stadium: Amar Hamam Stadium

Round 6	MC Alger	–	ES Sétif	Douéra
:		Flashscore; LFP		Stadium: Ali La Pointe Stadium

Round 12	ES Sétif	–	JS El Biar	Sétif
:		Flashscore; LFP		Stadium: 8 May 1945 Stadium

Round 13	Olympique Akbou	–	ES Sétif	Akbou
:		Flashscore; LFP		Stadium: Martyrs Stadium

Round 14	ES Sétif	–	USM Alger	Sétif
:		Flashscore; LFP		Stadium: 8 May 1945 Stadium

Round 15	JS Saoura	–	USM Alger	Béchar
:		Flashscore; LFP		Stadium: 20 August 1955 Stadium

Round 16	ES Ben Aknoun	–	ES Sétif	Belouizdad
:		Flashscore; LFP		Stadium: 20 August 1955 Stadium

Round 17	ES Sétif	–	CR Belouizdad	Sétif
:		Flashscore; LFP		Stadium: 8 May 1945 Stadium

Round 18	CS Constantine	–	ES Sétif	Constantine
:		Flashscore; LFP		Stadium: Chahid Hamlaoui Stadium

Round 19	ES Sétif	–	MC Oran	Sétif
:		Flashscore; LFP		Stadium: 8 May 1945 Stadium

Round 20	JS Kabylie	–	ES Sétif	Tizi Ouzou
:		Flashscore; LFP		Stadium: Hocine Aït Ahmed Stadium

Round 21	ES Sétif	–	MC Alger	Sétif
:		Flashscore; LFP		Stadium: 8 May 1945 Stadium

Round 22	CR Témouchent	–	ES Sétif	Aïn Témouchent
:		Flashscore; LFP		Stadium: Omar Oucief Stadium

Round 23	ES Sétif	–	ASO Chlef	Sétif
:		Flashscore; LFP		Stadium: 8 May 1945 Stadium

Round 24	MB Rouissat	–	ES Sétif	Ouargla
:		Flashscore; LFP		Stadium: 18 February Stadium

Round 25	US Biskra	–	ES Sétif	Zeribet El Oued
:		Flashscore; LFP		Stadium: Bouhafs Chabi Stadium

Round 26	ES Sétif	–	USM Khenchela	Sétif
:		Flashscore; LFP		Stadium: 8 May 1945 Stadium

Round 27	JS El Biar	–	ES Sétif	Blida
:		Flashscore; LFP		Stadium: Mustapha Tchaker Stadium

Round 28	ES Sétif	–	Olympique Akbou	Sétif
:		Flashscore; LFP		Stadium: 8 May 1945 Stadium

Round 29	USM Alger	–	ES Sétif	Algiers
:		Flashscore; LFP		Stadium: Stade du 5 Juillet

Round 30	ES Sétif	–	JS Saoura	Sétif
:		Flashscore; LFP		Stadium: 8 May 1945 Stadium

=== Algerian Cup ===
December 2026 Round of 64	–
:

== Squad information ==
=== Appearances and goals ===
As of 20 November 2026

No.	Pos	Player	Nat	Ligue 1			Algerian Cup			Total		
No.	Pos	Player	Nat	App	St	G	App	St	G	App	St	G
Goalkeepers
1	GK	Alexandre Oukidja	(Algeria)	8	8	0	0	0	0	0	0	0
16	GK	Zakaria Saidi	(Algeria)	1	1	0	0	0	0	0	0	0
30	GK	Zakaria Trad	(Algeria)	0	0	0	0	0	0	0	0	0
Defenders
3	CB	Issam Naim	(Algeria)	2	0	0	0	0	0	0	0	0
4	CB	Hadi Al-Hourani	(Jordan)	5	5	0	0	0	0	0	0	0
5	LB	Aïssa Boudechicha	(Algeria)	3	2	0	0	0	0	0	0	0
12	CB	Chemseddine Lakehal	(Algeria)	9	9	0	0	0	0	0	0	0
13	CB	Mick Omfia	(Gabon)	5	4	0	0	0	0	0	0	0
19	LB	Anis Khemaissia	(Algeria)	7	7	0	0	0	0	0	0	0
21	RB	Amine Zenadji	(Algeria)	3	2	0	0	0	0	0	0	0
23	CB	Slimane Bouteldja	(Algeria)	6	5	0	0	0	0	0	0	0
27	RB	Kamel Hamidi	(Algeria)	3	3	0	0	0	0	0	0	0
Midfielders
6	DM	Idris Messahel	(Algeria)	0	0	0	0	0	0	0	0	0
8	CM	Mohamed Hamek	(Algeria)	9	8	0	0	0	0	0	0	0
10	AM	Larbi Tabti	(Algeria)	7	6	1	0	0	0	0	0	0
15	AM	Abderrahmane Boungab	(Algeria)	7	2	0	0	0	0	0	0	0
22	CM	Dalil Hassen Khodja	(Algeria)	2	1	0	0	0	0	0	0	0
25	DM	Salim Akkal	(Algeria)	2	1	0	0	0	0	0	0	0
26	AM	Mohamed Reda Boumechra	(Algeria)	9	9	1	0	0	0	0	0	0
29	DM	Salifu Mudasiru	(Ghana)	7	6	0	0	0	0	0	0	0
Forwards
7	LW	Mohamed Islam Belkhir	(Algeria)	8	4	0	0	0	0	0	0	0
9	ST	Riad Benayad	(Algeria)	8	5	4	0	0	0	0	0	0
11	RW	Yousef Abu Jalboush	(Jordan)	5	4	1	0	0	0	0	0	0
17	RW	Mohamed Boukerma	(Algeria)	5	1	0	0	0	0	0	0	0
18	ST	Zakaria Benchaâ	(Algeria)	6	3	2	0	0	0	0	0	0
20	ST	Merouane Zerrouki	(Algeria)	7	2	1	0	0	0	0	0	0
24	LW	Imadeddine Bouchagoura	(Algeria)	5	1	1	0	0	0	0	0	0
Total				9		11	0		0	0		0

Last updated: 20 November 2026
Source: soccerway.com

=== Goalscorers ===
As of 20 November 2026

Includes all competitive matches.

No.	Nat.	Player	Pos.	L1	AC	TOTAL
9	(Algeria)	Riad Benayad	ST	4	0	4
18	(Algeria)	Zakaria Benchaâ	ST	2	0	2
26	(Algeria)	Mohamed Reda Boumechra	AM	1	0	1
11	(Jordan)	Yousef Abu Jalboush	RW	1	0	1
24	(Algeria)	Imadeddine Bouchagoura	LW	1	0	1
10	(Algeria)	Larbi Tabti	AM	1	0	1
20	(Algeria)	Merouane Zerrouki	ST	1	0	1
Own Goals				0	0	0
Totals				11	0	11

=== Clean sheets ===
As of 20 November 2026

Includes all competitive matches.

					Clean sheets		
No.	Nat	Name	GP	GA	L1	AC	Total
1	(Algeria)	Alexandre Oukidja	8	8	1	0	1
16	(Algeria)	Zakaria Saidi	1	1	0	0	0
30	(Algeria)	Zakaria Trad	0	0	0	0	0
		TOTALS		9	1	0	1
