= 2026–27 CS Constantine season =

CS Constantine
2026–27 season
- Owner: ENTP SPA
- President: Tarek Arama (until 24 October 2026)
- Head coach: Mondher Kebaier (from 2 July 2026) (until 18 October 2026); Amara Merouani (from 6 November 2026)
- Stadium: Chahid Hamlaoui Stadium
- Ligue 1: 10th
- Algerian Cup: Round of 64

The 2026–27 season, is CS Constantine's 31st season and the club's 16th consecutive season in the top flight of Algerian football. In addition to the domestic league, CS Constantine are participating in this season's editions of the Algerian Cup.

== Squad list ==
Players and squad numbers last updated on 31 August 2026.
Note: Flags indicate national team as has been defined under FIFA eligibility rules. Players may hold more than one non-FIFA nationality.

No.	Nat.	Name	Position	Date of Birth (Age)	Signed from
Goalkeepers
1	(Algeria)	Zakaria Bouhalfaya	GK	11 August 1997 (aged 29)	(Algeria) ES Sétif
16	(Algeria)	Oussama Mellala	GK	16 September 2003 (aged 22)	(Algeria) US Biskra
30	(Algeria)	Abdelmalek Necir	GK	6 September 1992 (aged 33)	(Algeria) NRB Teleghma
Defenders
2	(Algeria)	Mohamed Belgourai	RB	13 April 2005 (aged 21)	(Algeria) MB Rouissat
3	(Algeria)	Mounder Ayoune	LB	1 January 2006 (aged 20)	(Algeria) Youth team
4	(Algeria)	Ahmed Aït Abdesslem	CB	30 August 1997 (aged 28)	Unattached
5	(Algeria)	Yacine Zeghad	CB	29 November 2001 (aged 24)	(Algeria) MB Rouissat
6	(Democratic Republic of the Congo)	Johnson Atibu	CB	18 June 1997 (aged 29)	(Democratic Republic of the Congo) TP Mazembe
12	(Algeria)	Oussama Meddahi	RB	14 February 1991 (aged 35)	(Algeria) NA Hussein Dey
13	(Algeria)	Imadeddine Benmoussa	CB	21 May 2005 (aged 21)	(Algeria) IRB Laghouat
21	(Algeria)	Mehdi Beneddine	LB	26 February 1996 (aged 30)	(France) Châteauroux
24	(Uganda)	Rogers Torach	CB	23 June 2003 (aged 23)	(Uganda) Vipers SC
25	(Algeria)	Miloud Rebiaï	CB	12 December 1993 (aged 32)	(Algeria) CR Belouizdad
27	(Algeria)	Abdelmoumen Chikhi	LB	29 February 1996 (aged 30)	(Algeria) ES Sétif
Midfielders
8	(Algeria)	Hadji Chekal Affari	CM	24 February 2003 (aged 23)	(Algeria) USM Khenchela
10	(Algeria)	Brahim Dib	AM	6 July 1993 (aged 33)	(Algeria) AS Ain M'lila
11	(Algeria)	Mohamed Islam Bakir	CM	13 July 1996 (aged 30)	(Algeria) USM Khenchela
14	(Rwanda)	Djihad Bizimana	DM	12 December 1996 (aged 29)	(Libya) Al Ahli
15	(Algeria)	Mostafa Berkane	CM	21 October 2002 (aged 23)	(Algeria) NC Magra
22	(Algeria)	Louai Bouacida	CM	27 August 2006 (aged 20)	(Algeria) Youth team
Forwards
7	(Algeria)	Moundhir Bouzekri	LW	16 December 2001 (aged 24)	(Algeria) MC Alger
9	(Togo)	Yawo Agbagno	ST	25 May 2000 (aged 26)	(Libya) Al Ittihad
17	(Algeria)	Aimen Lahmeri	LW	28 May 1996 (aged 30)	(Algeria) JS Kabylie
18	(Algeria)	Karim Chaban	LW	6 January 2000 (aged 26)	Unattached
19	(Algeria)	Hamid Djaouchi	ST	19 December 1994 (aged 31)	(Algeria) USM Khenchela
20	(Algeria)	Moslem Anatouf	ST	8 May 2006 (aged 20)	(Algeria) MC Alger
26	(Algeria)	Nassim L'Ghoul	RW	30 July 1997 (aged 29)	(Switzerland) Bellinzona

== Transfers ==
=== In ===
==== Summer ====
Date	Pos	Player	Moving from	Fee	Source
7 July 2026	GK	(Algeria) Oussama Mellala	US Biskra	Free transfer	
7 July 2026	CB	(Algeria) Moussa Benzaid	(Libya) Asswehly SC	Free transfer	
7 July 2026	CB	(Algeria) Yacine Zeghad	MB Rouissat	Free transfer	
7 July 2026	CM	(Algeria) Mohamed Islam Bakir	USM Khenchela	Free transfer	
7 July 2026	ST	(Algeria) Hamid Djaouchi	USM Khenchela	Free transfer	
11 July 2026	RB	(Algeria) Mohamed Belgourai	MB Rouissat	Free transfer	
14 July 2026	CM	(Algeria) Hadji Chekal Affari	USM Khenchela	Free transfer	
28 July 2026	LB	(Algeria) Mehdi Beneddine	(France) Châteauroux	Free transfer	
29 July 2026	LW	(Algeria) Karim Chaban	Unattached	Free transfer	
2 August 2026	CB	(Democratic Republic of the Congo) Johnson Atibu	(Democratic Republic of the Congo) TP Mazembe	Free transfer	
8 August 2026	CB	(Uganda) Rogers Torach	(Uganda) Vipers SC	Undisclosed	
8 August 2026	ST	(Algeria) Moslem Anatouf	MC Alger	Loan	

=== Out ===
==== Summer ====
Date	Pos	Player	Moving to	Fee	Source
6 June 2026	LW	(Algeria) Ghiles Guenaoui	USM Alger	Loan return	
17 June 2026	CB	(Senegal) Mélo Ndiaye	(Iraq) Al-Kahrabaa SC	Free transfer	
28 June 2026	DM	(Algeria) Messala Merbah	JS Kabylie	Free transfer	
30 June 2026	LB	(Algeria) Houari Baouche	MC Oran	Free transfer	
7 July 2026	GK	(Algeria) Mohamed Khenniche	Unattached	Free transfer (Released)	
7 July 2026	CB	(Algeria) Chamseddine Derradji	Unattached	Free transfer (Released)	
7 July 2026	ST	(Nigeria) Tosin Omoyele	Unattached	Free transfer (Released)	
12 July 2026	DM	(Algeria) Mohamed Benchaira	ES Ben Aknoun	Free transfer	
20 July 2026	AM	(Algeria) Feth-Allah Tahar	Olympique Akbou	Free transfer	
28 July 2026	LW	(Algeria) Dadi El Hocine Mouaki	JS El Biar	Free transfer	
30 July 2026	RB	(Algeria) Abderrahmane Benadla	US Chaouia	Free transfer	
30 July 2026	ST	(Algeria) Ouadjih Khelfaoui	US Chaouia	Free transfer	
5 August 2026	CB	(Algeria) Moussa Benzaid	Unattached	Free transfer (Released)	

== Competitions ==
=== Overview ===
Competition	Record								Started round	Final position / round	First match	Last match
Competition	G	W	D	L	GF	GA	GD	Win %	Started round	Final position / round	First match	Last match
Ligue 1	10	3	1	6	12	18	−6	30.00	—N/a	To be confirmed	5 September 2026	In Progress
Algerian Cup	0	0	0	0	0	0	+0	—	Round of 64	To be confirmed	December 2026	In Progress
Total	10	3	1	6	12	18	−6	30.00				

Updated to match played 18 November 2026
Source: Competitions

=== Ligue 1 ===
==== League table ====
Pos	Team	Pld	W	D	L	GF	GA	GD	Pts
8	JS El Biar	10	3	3	4	13	12	+1	12
9	CR Témouchent	10	2	5	3	7	10	−3	11
10	CS Constantine	10	3	1	6	12	18	−6	10
11	ES Sétif	8	2	3	3	10	8	+2	9
12	ES Ben Aknoun	9	1	5	3	8	10	−2	8

Updated to match(es) played on 18 November 2026. Source: lfp.dz
Rules for classification: 1) Points; 2) Head-to-head points; 3) Head-to-head goal difference; 4) First half goal difference; 5) First half total goals; 6) Fairplay ranking; 7) Playoff.

==== Results summary ====
Overall								Home						Away					
Pld	W	D	L	GF	GA	GD	Pts	W	D	L	GF	GA	GD	W	D	L	GF	GA	GD
10	3	1	6	11	18	−7	10	3	0	2	9	6	+3	0	1	4	2	12	−10

Last updated: 18 November 2026.
Source: Competitive matches

==== Results by round ====
Round	1	2	3	4	5	6	7	8	9	10	11	12	13	14	15	16	17	18	19	20	21	22	23	24	25	26	27	28	29	30
Ground	A	H	A	H	A	H	A	H	A	H	A	A	H	A	H	H	A	H	A	H	A	H	A	H	A	H	H	A	H	A
Result	D	W	L	W	L	L	L	L	L	W																				
Position	8																													

Updated to match(es) played on 18 November 2026. Source: Competitive matches
A = Away; H = Home; W = Win; D = Draw; L = Loss

==== Matches ====
The league fixtures were announced on 3 August 2026.

All times are local, WAT (UTC+1).

Win Draw Loss Postponed

5 September 2026 Round 1	CR Témouchent	1–1	CS Constantine	Aïn Témouchent
19:00	Freifer 5'	Flashscore; LFP	L'Ghoul 69'	Stadium: Omar Oucief Stadium; Referee: Anes Azrine

12 September 2026 Round 2	CS Constantine	3–0	ASO Chlef	Constantine
21:00	Dib 30'; Agbagno 51'; Chaban 84'	Flashscore; LFP		Stadium: Chahid Hamlaoui Stadium; Referee: Tahar Boudjemaa

19 September 2026 Round 3	ES Sétif	5–1	CS Constantine	Sétif
19:00	Boumechra 37' (pen.); Benchaâ 71', 76'; Benayad 90+1'; Abu Jalboush 90+5'	Flashscore; LFP	Chikhi 1'	Stadium: 8 May 1945 Stadium; Referee: Yahia Dahar

7 October 2026 Round 4	CS Constantine	4–0	US Biskra	Constantine
18:00	Agbagno 37'; Barka 50' (o.g.); Rebiaï 65'; Djaouchi 73'	Flashscore; LFP		Stadium: Chahid Hamlaoui Stadium; Referee: Abdelali Ibrir

12 October 2026 Round 5	USM Khenchela	2–0	CS Constantine	Khenchela
15:00	Fall 44'; Benzid 56'	Flashscore; LFP		Stadium: Amar Hamam Stadium; Referee: Alaa Bouab

17 October 2026 Round 6	CS Constantine	2–4	JS El Biar	Constantine
17:00	Rebiaï 30'; Belgourai 50'	Flashscore; LFP	Mouaki 2', 27', 45+3'; Aribi 37' (pen.)	Stadium: Chahid Hamlaoui Stadium; Referee: Haitham Ghouti

23 October 2026 Round 7	Olympique Akbou	3–0	CS Constantine	Akbou
15:15	Hitala 13'; Zamoum 47'; Tahar 56'	Flashscore; LFP		Stadium: Martyrs Stadium; Referee: Tayeb Benyebka

31 October 2026 Round 8	CS Constantine	0–2	USM Alger	Constantine
17:00		Flashscore; LFP	Ramdaoui 12', 40'	Stadium: Chahid Hamlaoui Stadium; Referee: Youcef Taieb Bouderbal

8 November 2026 Round 9	JS Saoura	1–0	CS Constantine	Béchar
17:45	Belghanami 61'	Flashscore; LFP		Stadium: 20 August 1955 Stadium; Referee: Sid Ahmed Lellouchi

18 November 2026 Round 10	CS Constantine	1–0	ES Ben Aknoun	Constantine
17:45	L'Ghoul 44'	Flashscore; LFP		Stadium: Chahid Hamlaoui Stadium; Referee: Abdennour Khalfallah

Round 11	CR Belouizdad	–	CS Constantine	Baraki
:		Flashscore; LFP		Stadium: Nelson Mandela Stadium

Round 12	MB Rouissat	–	CS Constantine	Ouargla
:		Flashscore; LFP		Stadium: 18 February Stadium

Round 13	CS Constantine	–	MC Oran	Constantine
:		Flashscore; LFP		Stadium: Chahid Hamlaoui Stadium

Round 14	JS Kabylie	–	CS Constantine	Tizi Ouzou
:		Flashscore; LFP		Stadium: Hocine Aït Ahmed Stadium

Round 15	CS Constantine	–	MC Alger	Constantine
:		Flashscore; LFP		Stadium: Chahid Hamlaoui Stadium

Round 16	CS Constantine	–	CR Témouchent	Constantine
:		Flashscore; LFP		Stadium: Chahid Hamlaoui Stadium

Round 17	ASO Chlef	–	CS Constantine	Chlef
:		Flashscore; LFP		Stadium: Mohamed Boumezrag Stadium

Round 18	CS Constantine	–	ES Sétif	Constantine
:		Flashscore; LFP		Stadium: Chahid Hamlaoui Stadium

Round 19	US Biskra	–	CS Constantine	Zeribet El Oued
:		Flashscore; LFP		Stadium: Bouhafs Chabi Stadium

Round 20	CS Constantine	–	USM Khenchela	Constantine
:		Flashscore; LFP		Stadium: Chahid Hamlaoui Stadium

Round 21	JS El Biar	–	CS Constantine	Blida
:		Flashscore; LFP		Stadium: Mustapha Tchaker Stadium

Round 22	CS Constantine	–	Olympique Akbou	Constantine
:		Flashscore; LFP		Stadium: Chahid Hamlaoui Stadium

Round 23	USM Alger	–	CS Constantine	Algiers
:		Flashscore; LFP		Stadium: Stade du 5 Juillet

Round 24	CS Constantine	–	JS Saoura	Constantine
:		Flashscore; LFP		Stadium: Chahid Hamlaoui Stadium

Round 25	ES Ben Aknoun	–	CS Constantine	Belouizdad
:		Flashscore; LFP		Stadium: 20 August 1955 Stadium

Round 26	CS Constantine	–	CR Belouizdad	Constantine
:		Flashscore; LFP		Stadium: Chahid Hamlaoui Stadium

Round 27	CS Constantine	–	MB Rouissat	Constantine
:		Flashscore; LFP		Stadium: Chahid Hamlaoui Stadium

Round 28	MC Oran	–	CS Constantine	Bir El Djir
:		Flashscore; LFP		Stadium: Miloud Hadefi Stadium

Round 29	CS Constantine	–	JS Kabylie	Constantine
:		Flashscore; LFP		Stadium: Chahid Hamlaoui Stadium

Round 30	MC Alger	–	CS Constantine	Douéra
:		Flashscore; LFP		Stadium: Ali La Pointe Stadium

=== Algerian Cup ===
December 2026 Round of 64	–
:

== Squad information ==
=== Appearances and goals ===
As of 18 November 2026

No.	Pos	Player	Nat	Ligue 1			Algerian Cup			Total		
No.	Pos	Player	Nat	App	St	G	App	St	G	App	St	G
Goalkeepers
1	GK	Zakaria Bouhalfaya	(Algeria)	5	5	0	0	0	0	0	0	0
16	GK	Oussama Mellala	(Algeria)	3	3	0	0	0	0	0	0	0
30	GK	Abdelmalek Necir	(Algeria)	3	2	0	0	0	0	0	0	0
Defenders
2	RB	Mohamed Belgourai	(Algeria)	5	2	1	0	0	0	0	0	0
3	LB	Mounder Ayoune	(Algeria)	2	0	0	0	0	0	0	0	0
4	CB	Ahmed Aït Abdesslem	(Algeria)	0	0	0	0	0	0	0	0	0
5	CB	Yacine Zeghad	(Algeria)	10	9	0	0	0	0	0	0	0
6	CB	Johnson Atibu	(Democratic Republic of the Congo)	5	2	0	0	0	0	0	0	0
12	RB	Oussama Meddahi	(Algeria)	9	8	0	0	0	0	0	0	0
13	CB	Imadeddine Benmoussa	(Algeria)	0	0	0	0	0	0	0	0	0
21	LB	Mehdi Beneddine	(Algeria)	1	0	0	0	0	0	0	0	0
24	CB	Rogers Torach	(Uganda)	5	5	0	0	0	0	0	0	0
25	CB	Miloud Rebiaï	(Algeria)	9	5	2	0	0	0	0	0	0
27	LB	Abdelmoumen Chikhi	(Algeria)	10	10	1	0	0	0	0	0	0
Midfielders
8	CM	Hadji Chekal Affari	(Algeria)	9	6	0	0	0	0	0	0	0
10	AM	Brahim Dib	(Algeria)	4	3	1	0	0	0	0	0	0
11	CM	Mohamed Islam Bakir	(Algeria)	10	7	0	0	0	0	0	0	0
14	DM	Djihad Bizimana	(Rwanda)	8	7	0	0	0	0	0	0	0
15	CM	Mostafa Berkane	(Algeria)	7	4	0	0	0	0	0	0	0
22	CM	Louai Bouacida	(Algeria)	0	0	0	0	0	0	0	0	0
Forwards
7	LW	Moundhir Bouzekri	(Algeria)	4	1	0	0	0	0	0	0	0
9	ST	Yawo Agbagno	(Togo)	10	9	2	0	0	0	0	0	0
17	LW	Aimen Lahmeri	(Algeria)	10	9	0	0	0	0	0	0	0
18	LW	Karim Chaban	(Algeria)	7	4	1	0	0	0	0	0	0
19	ST	Hamid Djaouchi	(Algeria)	8	2	1	0	0	0	0	0	0
20	ST	Moslem Anatouf	(Algeria)	1	0	0	0	0	0	0	0	0
26	RW	Nassim L'Ghoul	(Algeria)	10	7	2	0	0	0	0	0	0
37	RW	Yakoub Ikhlef	(Algeria)	2	0	0	0	0	0	0	0	0
Total				10		12	0		0	0		0

Last updated: 18 November 2026
Source: soccerway.com

=== Goalscorers ===
As of 18 November 2026

Includes all competitive matches.

No.	Nat.	Player	Pos.	L1	AC	TOTAL
9	(Togo)	Yawo Agbagno	ST	2	0	2
25	(Algeria)	Miloud Rebiaï	CB	2	0	2
26	(Algeria)	Nassim L'Ghoul	RW	2	0	2
10	(Algeria)	Brahim Dib	AM	1	0	1
18	(Algeria)	Karim Chaban	LW	1	0	1
27	(Algeria)	Abdelmoumen Chikhi	LB	1	0	1
19	(Algeria)	Hamid Djaouchi	ST	1	0	1
2	(Algeria)	Mohamed Belgourai	RB	1	0	1
Own Goals				1	0	1
Totals				12	0	12

=== Clean sheets ===
As of 18 November 2026

Includes all competitive matches.

					Clean sheets		
No.	Nat	Name	GP	GA	L1	AC	Total
1	(Algeria)	Zakaria Bouhalfaya	5	11	1	0	1
16	(Algeria)	Oussama Mellala	3	2	1	0	1
30	(Algeria)	Abdelmalek Necir	3	5	2	0	2
		TOTALS		18	4	0	4
