= 2026–27 JS El Biar season =

JS El Biar
2026–27 season
- President: Abdelouahab Khouni (from 9 July 2026)
- Head coach: Mohamed Turqui
- Stadium: Omar Benrabah Stadium
- Ligue 1: 8th
- Algerian Cup: Round of 64

The 2026–27 season, is JS El Biar's 1st season in the top flight of Algerian football. In addition to the domestic league, JS El Biar are participating in this season's editions of the Algerian Cup.

== Squad list ==
Players and squad numbers last updated on 31 August 2026.
Note: Flags indicate national team as has been defined under FIFA eligibility rules. Players may hold more than one non-FIFA nationality.

No.	Nat.	Name	Position	Date of Birth (Age)	Signed from
Goalkeepers
1	(Algeria)	Djameleddine Zidan	GK	30 January 2003 (aged 23)	(Algeria)
16	(Algeria)	Mounir Aziria	GK	8 June 2006 (aged 20)	(Algeria) ES Mostaganem
30	(Algeria)	Toufik Moussaoui	GK	20 April 1991 (aged 34)	(Algeria) MC Alger
Defenders
2	(Algeria)	Imad Reguieg	RB	2 June 2002 (aged 24)	(Algeria) Paradou AC
3	(Algeria)	Faiz Amem	CB	13 October 2006 (aged 19)	(Algeria) MC Oran
4	(Algeria)	Abderrahmane Bekkour	CB	22 July 2003 (aged 23)	(Algeria) CR Belouizdad
5	(Guinea)	Bangaly Cissé	CB	28 December 2002 (aged 23)	(Tunisia) JS Kairouan
6	(Algeria)	Fayçal Abdat	CB	20 October 1986 (aged 39)	(Algeria) Amal Bou Saâda
15	(Algeria)	Mustapha Bouchina	CB	10 August 1991 (aged 35)	(Algeria) RC Kouba
20	(Algeria)	Omar Zeggai	LB	23 June 2004 (aged 22)	(Algeria) CR Témouchent
21	(Algeria)	Younes Ouassa	CB	4 July 1999 (aged 27)	(Algeria) CR Belouizdad
26	(Algeria)	Ahmed Maâmeri	LB	25 June 1997 (aged 29)	(Algeria) JS Kabylie
27	(Algeria)	Mohamed Guemroud	RB	28 August 1994 (aged 31)	(Algeria) USM Khenchela
Midfielders
8	(Algeria)	Oussama Chita	DM	31 October 1996 (aged 29)	(Algeria) MC El Bayadh
10	(Guinea)	Alhassane Bangoura	CM	12 December 2004 (aged 22)	(Algeria) MC Alger
11	(Algeria)	Meddah Kaddour	AM	27 July 1995 (aged 31)	(Algeria) US Chaouia
13	(Senegal)	Ibrahima Cissoko	CM	18 April 2003 (aged 24)	(Tunisia) CA Bizertin
22	(Senegal)	Alassane Kanté	CM	20 December 2000 (aged 26)	(Tanzania) Simba
25	(Algeria)	Djelloul Boukerma	AM	5 February 2001 (aged 25)	(Algeria) NA Hussein Dey
29	(Algeria)	Taha Yassine Tahar	DM	23 September 2000 (aged 25)	(Algeria) Paradou AC
Forwards
7	(Algeria)	Samir Kermiche	LW	22 February 1999 (aged 27)	(Algeria) RC Kouba
9	(Algeria)	Dadi El Hocine Mouaki	LW	11 September 1996 (aged 29)	(Algeria) CS Constantine
12	(Algeria)	Hamza Laireche	RW	5 September 2006 (aged 19)	(Algeria) ES Mostaganem
14	(Algeria)	Karim Aribi	ST	24 June 1994 (aged 32)	(Iraq) Al-Talaba
17	(Algeria)	Ammar Oukil	RW	7 July 1996 (aged 30)	(Algeria) USM Khenchela
18	(Algeria)	Belkacem Bakhtouchi	ST	6 February 2004 (aged 22)	(Algeria) WA Mostaganem
19	(Algeria)	Khayreddine Merzougui	ST	16 August 1992 (aged 34)	(Algeria) MB Rouissat
23	(Algeria)	Djallel Remouche	ST	2 June 1992 (aged 34)	(Algeria) GC Mascara
24	(Algeria)	Hamza Mellouk	ST	14 July 1998 (aged 28)	(Algeria) US Chaouia
28	(Algeria)	Islam Abbaci	RW	27 August 2005 (aged 21)	(Algeria) CR Belouizdad

== Transfers ==
=== In ===
==== Summer ====
Date	Pos	Player	Moving from	Fee	Source
16 July 2026	GK	(Algeria) Mounir Aziria	ES Mostaganem	Free transfer	
16 July 2026	CB	(Algeria) Younes Ouassa	CR Belouizdad	Free transfer	
16 July 2026	CB	(Algeria) Abderrahmane Bekkour	CR Belouizdad	Free transfer	
16 July 2026	RB	(Algeria) Imad Reguieg	Paradou AC	Free transfer	
16 July 2026	RB	(Algeria) Mohamed Guemroud	USM Khenchela	Free transfer	
16 July 2026	LB	(Algeria) Ahmed Maâmeri	JS Kabylie	Free transfer	
16 July 2026	LB	(Algeria) Omar Zeggai	CR Témouchent	Free transfer	
16 July 2026	DM	(Algeria) Taha Yassine Tahar	Paradou AC	Free transfer	
16 July 2026	RW	(Algeria) Islam Abbaci	CR Belouizdad	Free transfer	
16 July 2026	RW	(Algeria) Ammar Oukil	USM Khenchela	Free transfer	
16 July 2026	LW	(Algeria) Dadi El Hocine Mouaki	CS Constantine	Free transfer	
16 July 2026	LW	(Algeria) Samir Kermiche	RC Kouba	Free transfer	
16 July 2026	ST	(Algeria) Khayreddine Merzougui	MB Rouissat	Free transfer	
19 July 2026	CM	(Guinea) Alhassane Bangoura	MC Alger	Undisclosed	
7 August 2026	ST	(Algeria) Karim Aribi	(Iraq) Al-Talaba	Free transfer	
10 August 2026	CB	(Guinea) Bangaly Cissé	(Tunisia) JS Kairouan	Free transfer	
11 August 2026	CM	(Senegal) Ibrahima Cissoko	(Tunisia) CA Bizertin	Free transfer	
14 August 2026	CB	(Algeria) Faiz Amem	MC Oran	Free transfer	
17 August 2026	GK	(Algeria) Toufik Moussaoui	MC Alger	Free transfer	
31 August 2026	CM	(Senegal) Alassane Kanté	(Tanzania) Simba	Free transfer	

=== Out ===
==== Summer ====
Date	Pos	Player	Moving to	Fee	Source
7 July 2026	LB	(Algeria) Abderrahim Hamdani	ASO Chlef	Free transfer	
28 July 2026	LB	(Algeria) Zakaria Bencherifa	ESM Koléa	Free transfer	
28 July 2026	LW	(Algeria) Yasser Bouabdallah	ESM Koléa	Free transfer	
6 August 2026	ST	(Algeria) Zakarya Sadeuk Ben Abbas	MB Rouissat	Loan	
8 August 2026	ST	(Algeria) Rafik Zaimeche	MB Rouissat	Loan	

== Competitions ==
=== Overview ===
Competition	Record								Started round	Final position / round	First match	Last match
Competition	G	W	D	L	GF	GA	GD	Win %	Started round	Final position / round	First match	Last match
Ligue 1	10	3	3	4	13	12	+1	30.00	—N/a	To be confirmed	3 September 2026	In Progress
Algerian Cup	0	0	0	0	0	0	+0	—	Round of 64	To be confirmed	December 2026	In Progress
Total	10	3	3	4	13	12	+1	30.00				

Updated to match played 18 November 2026
Source: Competitions

=== Ligue 1 ===
==== League table ====
Pos	Team	Pld	W	D	L	GF	GA	GD	Pts
6	USM Alger	7	4	2	1	10	5	+5	14
7	Olympique Akbou	8	3	3	2	9	6	+3	12
8	JS El Biar	10	3	3	4	13	12	+1	12
9	CR Témouchent	10	2	5	3	7	10	−3	11
10	CS Constantine	10	3	1	6	12	18	−6	10

Updated to match(es) played on 18 November 2026. Source: lfp.dz
Rules for classification: 1) Points; 2) Head-to-head points; 3) Head-to-head goal difference; 4) First half goal difference; 5) First half total goals; 6) Fairplay ranking; 7) Playoff.

==== Results summary ====
Overall								Home						Away					
Pld	W	D	L	GF	GA	GD	Pts	W	D	L	GF	GA	GD	W	D	L	GF	GA	GD
10	3	3	4	13	12	+1	12	2	1	2	7	5	+2	1	2	2	6	7	−1

Last updated: 18 November 2026.
Source: Competitive matches

==== Results by round ====
Round	1	2	3	4	5	6	7	8	9	10	11	12	13	14	15	16	17	18	19	20	21	22	23	24	25	26	27	28	29	30
Ground	H	A	H	A	H	A	H	A	H	A	H	A	H	A	H	A	H	A	H	A	H	A	H	A	H	A	H	A	H	A
Result	L	L	W	D	L	W	D	L	W	D																				
Position	15																													

Updated to match(es) played on 18 November 2026. Source: Competitive matches
A = Away; H = Home; W = Win; D = Draw; L = Loss

==== Matches ====
The league fixtures were announced on 3 August 2026.

All times are local, WAT (UTC+1).

Win Draw Loss Postponed

3 September 2026 Round 1	JS El Biar	0–2	Olympique Akbou	Blida
21:00		Flashscore; LFP	Addadi 57' (pen.); Harouna 90+3'	Stadium: Mustapha Tchaker Stadium; Referee: Tayeb Benyebka

10 September 2026 Round 2	USM Alger	2–0	JS El Biar	Algiers
21:00	Draoui 30'; Ramdaoui 58'	Flashscore; LFP		Stadium: Stade du 5 Juillet; Referee: Yahia Dahar

18 September 2026 Round 3	JS El Biar	4–0	JS Saoura	Dar El Beïda
16:00	Merzougui 49'; Mouaki 78'; Kanté 88'; Cissoko 90+4'	Flashscore; LFP		Stadium: Omar Benrabah Stadium; Referee: Nabil Boukhalfa

7 October 2026 Round 4	ES Ben Aknoun	2–2	JS El Biar	Belouizdad
18:00	Benchaira 19'; Adjout 49'	Flashscore; LFP	Mouaki 74'; Guemroud 61'	Stadium: 20 August 1955 Stadium; Referee: Mustapha Ghorbal

12 October 2026 Round 5	JS El Biar	2–3	CR Belouizdad	Dar El Beïda
15:00	Ben Hammouda 1'; Boualia 37'; El Melali 69'	Flashscore; LFP	Aribi 11', 56'	Stadium: Omar Benrabah Stadium; Referee: Lotfi Bekouassa

17 October 2026 Round 6	CS Constantine	2–4	JS El Biar	Constantine
17:00	Rebiaï 30'; Belgourai 50'	Flashscore; LFP	Mouaki 2', 27', 45+3'; Aribi 37' (pen.)	Stadium: Chahid Hamlaoui Stadium; Referee: Haitham Ghouti

23 October 2026 Round 7	JS El Biar	0–0	MC Oran	Dar El Beïda
15:15		Flashscore; LFP		Stadium: Omar Benrabah Stadium; Referee: Akram Mechairia

30 October 2026 Round 8	JS Kabylie	1–0	JS El Biar	Tizi Ouzou
17:45	Messaoudi 58' (pen.)	Flashscore; LFP		Stadium: Hocine Aït Ahmed Stadium; Referee: Fateh Harkat

8 November 2026 Round 9	JS El Biar	1–0	MC Alger	Dar El Beïda
14:00	Kermiche 7'	Flashscore; LFP		Stadium: Omar Benrabah Stadium; Referee: Yahia Dahar

18 November 2026 Round 10	CR Témouchent	0–0	JS El Biar	Aïn Témouchent
17:45		Flashscore; LFP		Stadium: Omar Oucief Stadium; Referee: Mehdi Oukil

30 November 2026 Round 11	JS El Biar	–	ASO Chlef	Dar El Beïda
14:00		Flashscore; LFP		Stadium: Omar Benrabah Stadium

Round 12	ES Sétif	–	JS El Biar	Sétif
:		Flashscore; LFP		Stadium: 8 May 1945 Stadium

Round 13	JS El Biar	–	US Biskra	Dar El Beïda
:		Flashscore; LFP		Stadium: Omar Benrabah Stadium

Round 14	USM Khenchela	–	JS El Biar	Khenchela
:		Flashscore; LFP		Stadium: Amar Hamam Stadium

Round 15	JS El Biar	–	MB Rouissat	Dar El Beïda
:		Flashscore; LFP		Stadium: Omar Benrabah Stadium

Round 16	Olympique Akbou	–	JS El Biar	Akbou
:		Flashscore; LFP		Stadium: Martyrs Stadium

Round 17	JS El Biar	–	USM Alger	Dar El Beïda
:		Flashscore; LFP		Stadium: Omar Benrabah Stadium

Round 18	JS Saoura	–	JS El Biar	Béchar
:		Flashscore; LFP		Stadium: 20 August 1955 Stadium

Round 19	JS El Biar	–	ES Ben Aknoun	Dar El Beïda
:		Flashscore; LFP		Stadium: Omar Benrabah Stadium

Round 20	CR Belouizdad	–	JS El Biar	Baraki
:		Flashscore; LFP		Stadium: Nelson Mandela Stadium

Round 21	JS El Biar	–	CS Constantine	Dar El Beïda
:		Flashscore; LFP		Stadium: Omar Benrabah Stadium

Round 22	MC Oran	–	JS El Biar	Bir El Djir
:		Flashscore; LFP		Stadium: Miloud Hadefi Stadium

Round 23	JS El Biar	–	JS Kabylie	Dar El Beïda
:		Flashscore; LFP		Stadium: Omar Benrabah Stadium

Round 24	MC Alger	–	JS El Biar	Douéra
:		Flashscore; LFP		Stadium: Ali La Pointe Stadium

Round 25	JS El Biar	–	CR Témouchent	Dar El Beïda
:		Flashscore; LFP		Stadium: Omar Benrabah Stadium

Round 26	ASO Chlef	–	JS El Biar	Chlef
:		Flashscore; LFP		Stadium: Mohamed Boumezrag Stadium

Round 27	JS El Biar	–	ES Sétif	Dar El Beïda
:		Flashscore; LFP		Stadium: Omar Benrabah Stadium

Round 28	US Biskra	–	JS El Biar	Zeribet El Oued
:		Flashscore; LFP		Stadium: Bouhafs Chabi Stadium

Round 29	JS El Biar	–	USM Khenchela	Dar El Beïda
:		Flashscore; LFP		Stadium: Omar Benrabah Stadium

Round 30	MB Rouissat	–	JS El Biar	Ouargla
:		Flashscore; LFP		Stadium: 18 February Stadium

=== Algerian Cup ===
December 2026 Round of 64	–
:

== Squad information ==
=== Appearances and goals ===
As of 18 November 2026

No.	Pos	Player	Nat	Ligue 1			Algerian Cup			Total		
No.	Pos	Player	Nat	App	St	G	App	St	G	App	St	G
Goalkeepers
1	GK	Djameleddine Zidan	(Algeria)	1	1	0	0	0	0	0	0	0
16	GK	Mounir Aziria	(Algeria)	0	0	0	0	0	0	0	0	0
30	GK	Toufik Moussaoui	(Algeria)	9	9	0	0	0	0	0	0	0
Defenders
2	RB	Imad Reguieg	(Algeria)	4	2	0	0	0	0	0	0	0
3	CB	Faiz Amem	(Algeria)	0	0	0	0	0	0	0	0	0
4	CB	Abderrahmane Bekkour	(Algeria)	1	0	0	0	0	0	0	0	0
5	CB	Bangaly Cissé	(Guinea)	10	10	0	0	0	0	0	0	0
6	CB	Fayçal Abdat	(Algeria)	6	6	0	0	0	0	0	0	0
15	CB	Mustapha Bouchina	(Algeria)	10	10	0	0	0	0	0	0	0
20	LB	Omar Zeggai	(Algeria)	1	0	0	0	0	0	0	0	0
21	CB	Younes Ouassa	(Algeria)	7	7	0	0	0	0	0	0	0
26	LB	Ahmed Maâmeri	(Algeria)	7	5	0	0	0	0	0	0	0
27	RB	Mohamed Guemroud	(Algeria)	9	8	1	0	0	0	0	0	0
Midfielders
8	DM	Oussama Chita	(Algeria)	7	2	0	0	0	0	0	0	0
10	CM	Alhassane Bangoura	(Guinea)	8	6	0	0	0	0	0	0	0
11	AM	Meddah Kaddour	(Algeria)	7	1	0	0	0	0	0	0	0
13	CM	Ibrahima Cissoko	(Senegal)	7	5	1	0	0	0	0	0	0
22	CM	Alassane Kanté	(Senegal)	7	6	1	0	0	0	0	0	0
25	AM	Djelloul Boukerma	(Algeria)	6	4	0	0	0	0	0	0	0
29	DM	Taha Yassine Tahar	(Algeria)	3	2	0	0	0	0	0	0	0
Forwards
7	LW	Samir Kermiche	(Algeria)	6	4	1	0	0	0	0	0	0
9	LW	Dadi El Hocine Mouaki	(Algeria)	9	7	5	0	0	0	0	0	0
12	RW	Hamza Laireche	(Algeria)	0	0	0	0	0	0	0	0	0
14	ST	Karim Aribi	(Algeria)	8	5	3	0	0	0	0	0	0
17	RW	Ammar Oukil	(Algeria)	3	0	0	0	0	0	0	0	0
18	ST	Belkacem Bakhtouchi	(Algeria)	4	0	0	0	0	0	0	0	0
19	ST	Khayreddine Merzougui	(Algeria)	7	5	1	0	0	0	0	0	0
23	ST	Djallel Remouche	(Algeria)	3	0	0	0	0	0	0	0	0
24	ST	Hamza Mellouk	(Algeria)	3	1	0	0	0	0	0	0	0
28	RW	Islam Abbaci	(Algeria)	5	0	0	0	0	0	0	0	0
Total				10		13	0		0	0		0

Last updated: 18 November 2026
Source: soccerway.com

=== Goalscorers ===
As of 18 November 2026

Includes all competitive matches.

No.	Nat.	Player	Pos.	L1	AC	TOTAL
9	(Algeria)	Dadi El Hocine Mouaki	LW	5	0	5
14	(Algeria)	Karim Aribi	ST	3	0	3
19	(Algeria)	Khayreddine Merzougui	ST	1	0	1
22	(Senegal)	Alassane Kanté	CM	1	0	1
13	(Senegal)	Ibrahima Cissoko	CM	1	0	1
27	(Algeria)	Mohamed Guemroud	RB	1	0	1
7	(Algeria)	Samir Kermiche	ST	1	0	1
Own Goals				0	0	0
Totals				13	0	13

=== Clean sheets ===
As of 18 November 2026

Includes all competitive matches.

					Clean sheets		
No.	Nat	Name	GP	GA	L1	AC	Total
1	(Algeria)	Djameleddine Zidan	1	3	0	0	0
16	(Algeria)	Mounir Aziria	0	0	0	0	0
30	(Algeria)	Toufik Moussaoui	9	8	4	0	4
		TOTALS		12	4	0	4
