= 2026–27 MB Rouissat season =

MB Rouissat
2026–27 season
- President: Mohamed Larouci Bensaci
- Head coach: Djilali Bahloul (from 9 July 2026) (until 6 November 2026); Abdelhaq Belaid (from 14 November 2026)
- Stadium: 18 February Stadium
- Ligue 1: 3rd
- Algerian Cup: Round of 64

The 2026–27 season, is MB Rouissat's 2nd consecutive season in the top flight of Algerian football. In addition to the domestic league, MB Rouissat are participating in this season's editions of the Algerian Cup.

== Squad list ==
Players and squad numbers last updated on 31 August 2026.
Note: Flags indicate national team as has been defined under FIFA eligibility rules. Players may hold more than one non-FIFA nationality.

No.	Nat.	Name	Position	Date of Birth (Age)	Signed from
Goalkeepers
1	(Algeria)	Djalaleddine Rahal	GK	21 November 2000 (aged 25)	(Algeria) Reserve team
16	(Algeria)	Léonard Aggoune	GK	18 December 1997 (aged 28)	Unattached
30	(Algeria)	Abdedjabar Beklal	GK	10 December 2004 (aged 21)	(Algeria) MC Alger
Defenders
2	(Republic of the Congo)	Djigo Saïkou	RB	20 November 2004 (aged 21)	(Algeria) US Biskra
3	(Algeria)	Abdennour Kherroubi	LB	28 April 1999 (aged 27)	(Algeria) CA Batna
4	(Ghana)	Hamidu Fatawu	LB	4 March 1999 (aged 27)	(Egypt) Ghazl El Mahalla
5	(Algeria)	Benali Benamar	CB	12 January 1995 (aged 31)	(Algeria) ES Mostaganem
6	(Algeria)	Moussa Benzaid	CB	3 March 1999 (aged 27)	Unattached
17	(Algeria)	Zahreddine Benabda	RB	30 November 1997 (aged 28)	(Algeria) MC El Bayadh
18	(Algeria)	Aymen Gaid	CB	13 November 1996 (aged 29)	(Algeria) MO Constantine
20	(Algeria)	Rafik Zaimeche	LB	10 May 2004 (aged 22)	(Algeria) JS El Biar
25	(Algeria)	Hamza Salem	CB	10 January 1998 (aged 28)	(Algeria) Paradou AC
27	(Algeria)	Adda Derder	RB	28 March 1998 (aged 28)	(Algeria) ES Sétif
Midfielders
8	(Algeria)	Messaoud Midoune	DM	20 February 1995 (aged 31)	(Algeria) MSP Batna
12	(Algeria)	Mohammed Yakoubi	DM	20 December 2006 (aged 19)	(Algeria) MO Béjaïa
13	(Cameroon)	Mohamed Moluh Mounta	CM	5 March 2001 (aged 25)	(Cameroon) Panthère du Ndé
14	(Algeria)	Aymen Chadli	CM	3 September 1999 (aged 26)	(Algeria) JSM Tiaret
23	(Algeria)	Mohamed Tlili	DM	19 February 2003 (aged 23)	(Algeria)
26	(Algeria)	Ammar El Orfi	DM	3 November 1998 (aged 27)	(Algeria) MC El Bayadh
29	(Algeria)	Mohamed Mahi	DM	13 June 2006 (aged 20)	(Algeria) CR Belouizdad
Forwards
7	(Algeria)	Nadji Benkheira	RW	17 September 1995 (aged 30)	(Algeria) RC Kouba
9	(Mauritania)	Mamadou Sy	ST	31 December 2000 (aged 25)	(Gabon) APR F.C.
11	(Algeria)	Bilal Hend	LW	18 January 2000 (aged 26)	(Luxembourg) FC Progrès Niederkorn
15	(Algeria)	Zakarya Sadeuk Ben Abbas	ST	25 February 2004 (aged 22)	(Algeria) JS El Biar
19	(Algeria)	Rezki Hamroune	RW	10 March 1996 (aged 30)	(Algeria) Olympique Akbou
21	(Algeria)	Lamine Mada	ST	25 January 2006 (aged 20)	(Algeria) Reserve team
22	(Algeria)	Ridha Djahdou	ST	9 April 1998 (aged 28)	(Algeria) ES Mostaganem
24	(Algeria)	Abdelhakim Amokrane	ST	10 May 1994 (aged 32)	(Algeria) MC El Bayadh
28	(Algeria)	Oussama Khiari	LW	20 July 2005 (aged 21)	(Algeria) MC El Bayadh

== Transfers ==
=== In ===
==== Summer ====
Date	Pos	Player	Moving from	Fee	Source
15 July 2026	RW	(Algeria) Rezki Hamroune	Olympique Akbou	Free transfer	
15 July 2026	ST	(Mauritania) Mamadou Sy	(Rwanda) APR F.C.	Free transfer	
15 July 2026	RB	(Algeria) Adda Derder	ES Sétif	Free transfer	
5 August 2026	CB	(Algeria) Hamza Salem	Paradou AC	Free transfer	
5 August 2026	DM	(Algeria) Mohamed Mahi	CR Belouizdad	Free transfer	
5 August 2026	ST	(Algeria) Abdelhakim Amokrane	MC El Bayadh	Free transfer	
6 August 2026	ST	(Algeria) Aymen Gaid	MO Constantine	Free transfer	
6 August 2026	ST	(Algeria) Zakarya Sadeuk Ben Abbas	JS El Biar	Loan	
6 August 2026	GK	(Algeria) Léonard Aggoune	Unattached	Free transfer	
7 August 2026	LB	(Algeria) Abdennour Kherroubi	CA Batna	Free transfer	
7 August 2026	CB	(Algeria) Benali Benamar	ES Mostaganem	Free transfer	
8 August 2026	LW	(Algeria) Bilal Hend	(Luxembourg) FC Progrès Niederkorn	Free transfer	
8 August 2026	LB	(Algeria) Rafik Zaimeche	JS El Biar	Loan	
9 August 2026	CB	(Algeria) Moussa Benzaid	Unattached	Free transfer	
10 August 2026	RB	(Algeria) Zahreddine Benabda	MC El Bayadh	Free transfer	
11 August 2026	DM	(Algeria) Mohammed Yakoubi	MO Béjaïa	Free transfer	
11 August 2026	CM	(Algeria) Aymen Chadli	JSM Tiaret	Free transfer	
26 August 2026	CM	(Cameroon) Mohamed Moluh Mounta	(Cameroon) Panthère du Ndé	Free transfer	

=== Out ===
==== Summer ====
Date	Pos	Player	Moving to	Fee	Source
7 June 2026	ST	(Algeria) Massinissa Nezla	JS Kabylie	Loan return	
27 June 2026	AM	(Republic of the Congo) Julio Bandessi	CR Belouizdad	Undisclosed	
4 July 2026	AM	(Algeria) Alaeddine Belaribi	ASO Chlef	Free transfer	
7 July 2026	CB	(Algeria) Yacine Zeghad	CS Constantine	Free transfer	
11 July 2026	RB	(Algeria) Mohamed Belgourai	CS Constantine	Free transfer	
16 July 2026	ST	(Algeria) Khayreddine Merzougui	JS El Biar	Free transfer	
19 July 2026	LW	(Algeria) Faik Amrane	USM Khenchela	Free transfer	
28 July 2026	GK	(Algeria) Redouane Maachou	US Biskra	Free transfer	
2 August 2026	CB	(Algeria) Khaled Bouhakak	US Biskra	Free transfer	
4 August 2026	DM	(Algeria) Badreddine Touki	Unattached	Free transfer (Released)	
4 August 2026	AM	(Algeria) Abdenacer Bensaci	Unattached	Free transfer (Released)	
4 August 2026	AM	(Algeria) Abdelkodous Bensaci	Unattached	End of contract	
10 August 2026	ST	(Republic of the Congo) Destaing Sikoula	Unattached	Free transfer (Released)	
19 August 2026	AM	(Algeria) Ihab Bensari	AS Khroub	Free transfer	
23 August 2026	CB	(Algeria) Hamza Rebiai	Unattached	Free transfer (Released)	
23 August 2026	RW	(Algeria) Naoufel Merdja	Unattached	Free transfer (Released)	

== Competitions ==
=== Overview ===
Competition	Record								Started round	Final position / round	First match	Last match
Competition	G	W	D	L	GF	GA	GD	Win %	Started round	Final position / round	First match	Last match
Ligue 1	10	5	3	2	10	6	+4	50.00	—N/a	To be confirmed	4 September 2026	In Progress
Algerian Cup	0	0	0	0	0	0	+0	—	Round of 64	To be confirmed	December 2026	In Progress
Total	10	5	3	2	10	6	+4	50.00				

Updated to match played 19 November 2026
Source: Competitions

=== Ligue 1 ===
==== League table ====
Pos	Team	Pld	W	D	L	GF	GA	GD	Pts	Qualification or relegation
1	JS Kabylie	9	6	2	1	13	3	+10	20	Qualification for CAF Champions League
2	CR Belouizdad	9	6	2	1	13	8	+5	20	Qualification for CAF Champions League
3	MB Rouissat	10	5	3	2	10	6	+4	18	Qualification for CAF Confederation Cup
4	MC Alger	8	5	1	2	9	3	+6	16	
5	Olympique Akbou	9	4	3	2	10	6	+4	15	

Updated to match(es) played on 19 November 2026. Source: lfp.dz
Rules for classification: 1) Points; 2) Head-to-head points; 3) Head-to-head goal difference; 4) First half goal difference; 5) First half total goals; 6) Fairplay ranking; 7) Playoff.

==== Results summary ====
Overall								Home						Away					
Pld	W	D	L	GF	GA	GD	Pts	W	D	L	GF	GA	GD	W	D	L	GF	GA	GD
10	5	3	2	10	6	+4	18	4	1	0	6	1	+5	1	2	2	4	5	−1

Last updated: 19 November 2026.
Source: Competitive matches

==== Results by round ====
Round	1	2	3	4	5	6	7	8	9	10	11	12	13	14	15	16	17	18	19	20	21	22	23	24	25	26	27	28	29	30
Ground	A	H	A	H	A	H	A	H	A	H	A	H	A	H	A	H	A	H	A	H	A	H	A	H	A	H	A	H	A	H
Result	L	W	L	W	W	W	D	D	D	W																				
Position																														

Updated to match(es) played on 19 November 2026. Source: Competitive matches
A = Away; H = Home; W = Win; D = Draw; L = Loss

==== Matches ====
The league fixtures were announced on 3 August 2026.

All times are local, WAT (UTC+1).

Win Draw Loss Postponed

4 September 2026 Round 1	JS Kabylie	1–0	MB Rouissat	Tizi Ouzou
21:00	Belhocini 41'	Flashscore; LFP		Stadium: Hocine Aït Ahmed Stadium; Referee: Akram Mechairia

12 September 2026 Round 2	MB Rouissat	2–0	Olympique Akbou	Ouargla
19:00	Midoune 56'; Amokrane 90+5'	Flashscore; LFP		Stadium: 18 February Stadium; Referee: Ayoub Belhachemi

18 September 2026 Round 3	MC Alger	2–0	MB Rouissat	Douéra
19:00	Boukholda 7'; Kohili 61'	Flashscore; LFP		Stadium: Ali La Pointe Stadium; Referee: Haitham Ghouti

8 October 2026 Round 4	MB Rouissat	1–0	USM Alger	Ouargla
18:00	El Orfi 59' (pen.)	Flashscore; LFP		Stadium: 18 February Stadium; Referee: Fateh Harkat

14 October 2026 Round 5	CR Témouchent	0–2	MB Rouissat	Aïn Témouchent
18:00		Flashscore; LFP	Fatawu 30'; Amokrane 75'	Stadium: Omar Oucief Stadium; Referee: Yahia Dehar

18 October 2026 Round 6	MB Rouissat	1–0	JS Saoura	Ouargla
17:45	Midoune 6'	Flashscore; LFP		Stadium: 18 February Stadium; Referee: Mehdi Oukil

24 October 2026 Round 7	ASO Chlef	2–2	MB Rouissat	Chlef
17:00	Hamdani 36'	Flashscore; LFP	Amokrane 90+4'	Stadium: Mohamed Boumezrag Stadium; Referee: Lotfi Bekouassa

31 October 2026 Round 8	MB Rouissat	1–1	ES Ben Aknoun	Ouargla
17:45	Derder 31'	Flashscore; LFP	Adjout 48'	Stadium: 18 February Stadium; Referee: Abdelali Ibrir

7 November 2026 Round 9	ES Sétif	1–1	MB Rouissat	Sétif
17:45	Tabti 53'	Flashscore; LFP	El Orfi 70' (pen.)	Stadium: 8 May 1945 Stadium; Referee: Alaa Bouab

19 November 2026 Round 10	MB Rouissat	–	CR Belouizdad	Ouargla
17:45	Salem 60'	Flashscore; LFP		Stadium: 18 February Stadium; Referee: Naïm Bouara

30 November 2026 Round 11	US Biskra	–	MB Rouissat	Zeribet El Oued
14:00		Flashscore; LFP		Stadium: Bouhafs Chabi Stadium

Round 12	MB Rouissat	–	CS Constantine	Ouargla
:		Flashscore; LFP		Stadium: 18 February Stadium

Round 13	USM Khenchela	–	MB Rouissat	Khenchela
:		Flashscore; LFP		Stadium: Amar Hamam Stadium

Round 14	MB Rouissat	–	MC Oran	Ouargla
:		Flashscore; LFP		Stadium: 18 February Stadium

Round 15	JS El Biar	–	MB Rouissat	Blida
:		Flashscore; LFP		Stadium: Mustapha Tchaker Stadium

Round 16	MB Rouissat	–	JS Kabylie	Ouargla
:		Flashscore; LFP		Stadium: 18 February Stadium

Round 17	Olympique Akbou	–	MB Rouissat	Akbou
:		Flashscore; LFP		Stadium: Martyrs Stadium

Round 18	MB Rouissat	–	MC Alger	Ouargla
:		Flashscore; LFP		Stadium: 18 February Stadium

Round 19	USM Alger	–	MB Rouissat	Algiers
:		Flashscore; LFP		Stadium: Stade du 5 Juillet

Round 20	MB Rouissat	–	CR Témouchent	Ouargla
:		Flashscore; LFP		Stadium: 18 February Stadium

Round 21	JS Saoura	–	MB Rouissat	Béchar
:		Flashscore; LFP		Stadium: 20 August 1955 Stadium

Round 22	MB Rouissat	–	ASO Chlef	Ouargla
:		Flashscore; LFP		Stadium: 18 February Stadium

Round 23	ES Ben Aknoun	–	MB Rouissat	Belouizdad
:		Flashscore; LFP		Stadium: 20 August 1955 Stadium

Round 24	MB Rouissat	–	ES Sétif	Ouargla
:		Flashscore; LFP		Stadium: 18 February Stadium

Round 25	CR Belouizdad	–	MB Rouissat	Baraki
:		Flashscore; LFP		Stadium: Nelson Mandela Stadium

Round 26	MB Rouissat	–	US Biskra	Ouargla
:		Flashscore; LFP		Stadium: 18 February Stadium

Round 27	CS Constantine	–	MB Rouissat	Constantine
:		Flashscore; LFP		Stadium: Chahid Hamlaoui Stadium

Round 28	MB Rouissat	–	USM Khenchela	Ouargla
:		Flashscore; LFP		Stadium: 18 February Stadium

Round 29	MC Oran	–	MB Rouissat	Bir El Djir
:		Flashscore; LFP		Stadium: Miloud Hadefi Stadium

Round 30	MB Rouissat	–	JS El Biar	Ouargla
:		Flashscore; LFP		Stadium: 18 February Stadium

=== Algerian Cup ===
December 2026 Round of 64	–
:

== Squad information ==
=== Appearances and goals ===
As of 19 November 2026

No.	Pos	Player	Nat	Ligue 1			Algerian Cup			Total		
No.	Pos	Player	Nat	App	St	G	App	St	G	App	St	G
Goalkeepers
1	GK	Djalaleddine Rahal	(Algeria)	10	10	0	0	0	0	0	0	0
16	GK	Léonard Aggoune	(Algeria)	1	0	0	0	0	0	0	0	0
30	GK	Abdedjabar Beklal	(Algeria)	0	0	0	0	0	0	0	0	0
Defenders
2	RB	Djigo Saïkou	(Republic of the Congo)	0	0	0	0	0	0	0	0	0
3	LB	Abdennour Kherroubi	(Algeria)	0	0	0	0	0	0	0	0	0
4	LB	Hamidu Fatawu	(Ghana)	8	5	1	0	0	0	0	0	0
5	CB	Benali Benamar	(Algeria)	7	7	0	0	0	0	0	0	0
6	CB	Moussa Benzaid	(Algeria)	8	6	0	0	0	0	0	0	0
17	RB	Zahreddine Benabda	(Algeria)	8	7	0	0	0	0	0	0	0
18	CB	Aymen Gaid	(Algeria)	1	0	0	0	0	0	0	0	0
20	LB	Rafik Zaimeche	(Algeria)	0	0	0	0	0	0	0	0	0
25	CB	Hamza Salem	(Algeria)	10	10	1	0	0	0	0	0	0
27	RB	Adda Derder	(Algeria)	9	6	0	0	0	0	0	0	0
Midfielders
8	DM	Messaoud Midoune	(Algeria)	7	5	2	0	0	0	0	0	0
12	DM	Mohammed Yakoubi	(Algeria)	1	0	0	0	0	0	0	0	0
13	CM	Mohamed Moluh Mounta	(Cameroon)	8	7	0	0	0	0	0	0	0
14	CM	Aymen Chadli	(Algeria)	3	1	0	0	0	0	0	0	0
23	DM	Mohamed Tlili	(Algeria)	10	7	0	0	0	0	0	0	0
26	DM	Ammar El Orfi	(Algeria)	10	10	2	0	0	0	0	0	0
29	DM	Mohamed Mahi	(Algeria)	1	0	0	0	0	0	0	0	0
Forwards
7	RW	Nadji Benkheira	(Algeria)	9	7	0	0	0	0	0	0	0
9	ST	Mamadou Sy	(Mauritania)	6	5	0	0	0	0	0	0	0
11	LW	Bilal Hend	(Algeria)	10	6	0	0	0	0	0	0	0
15	ST	Zakarya Sadeuk Ben Abbas	(Algeria)	3	1	0	0	0	0	0	0	0
19	RW	Rezki Hamroune	(Algeria)	9	5	0	0	0	0	0	0	0
21	ST	Lamine Mada	(Algeria)	0	0	0	0	0	0	0	0	0
22	ST	Ridha Djahdou	(Algeria)	5	2	0	0	0	0	0	0	0
24	ST	Abdelhakim Amokrane	(Algeria)	7	2	2	0	0	0	0	0	0
28	LW	Oussama Khiari	(Algeria)	1	1	0	0	0	0	0	0	0
Total				10		10	0		0	0		0

Last updated: 19 November 2026
Source: soccerway.com

=== Goalscorers ===
As of 19 November 2026

Includes all competitive matches.

No.	Nat.	Player	Pos.	L1	AC	TOTAL
24	(Algeria)	Abdelhakim Amokrane	ST	3	0	3
8	(Algeria)	Messaoud Midoune	DM	2	0	2
26	(Algeria)	Ammar El Orfi	DM	2	0	2
4	(Ghana)	Hamidu Fatawu	LB	1	0	1
27	(Algeria)	Adda Derder	RB	1	0	1
25	(Algeria)	Hamza Salem	CB	1	0	1
Own Goals				0	0	0
Totals				10	0	10

=== Clean sheets ===
As of 19 November 2026

Includes all competitive matches.

					Clean sheets		
No.	Nat	Name	GP	GA	L1	AC	Total
1	(Algeria)	Djalaleddine Rahal	10	6	5	0	5
16	(Algeria)	Léonard Aggoune	1	0	1	0	1
30	(Algeria)	Abdedjabar Beklal	0	0	0	0	0
		TOTALS		6	6	0	6
