= 2026–27 ES Ben Aknoun season =

ES Ben Aknoun
2026–27 season
- President: Kamel Meberbeche
- Head coach: Mounir Zeghdoud (until 9 November 2026); Lotfi Boudraa (from 16 November 2026)
- Stadium: 20 August 1955 Stadium
- Ligue 1: 12th
- Algerian Cup: Round of 64

The 2026–27 season, is ES Ben Aknoun's 3rd season and the club's 2nd consecutive season in the top flight of Algerian football. In addition to the domestic league, ES Ben Aknoun are participating in this season's editions of the Algerian Cup.

== Squad list ==
Players and squad numbers last updated on 31 August 2026.
Note: Flags indicate national team as has been defined under FIFA eligibility rules. Players may hold more than one non-FIFA nationality.

No.	Nat.	Name	Position	Date of Birth (Age)	Signed from
Goalkeepers
1	(Algeria)	Mohamed Medjadji	GK	30 March 2002 (aged 24)	(Algeria) MO Béjaïa
16	(Algeria)	Kheireddine Boussouf	GK	7 December 1987 (aged 38)	(Algeria) CS Constantine
30	(Algeria)	Amayas Boudedja	GK	4 January 2005 (aged 21)	(Algeria) Paradou AC
Defenders
2	(Algeria)	Aymen Chaaraoui	RB	26 July 1997 (aged 29)	(Algeria) USM Khenchela
3	(Algeria)	Abdelkader Tamimi	CB	20 March 2001 (aged 25)	(Algeria) ES Mostaganem
4	(Algeria)	M'Hamed Merouani	CB	29 March 1987 (aged 39)	(Algeria) MC El Bayadh
5	(Algeria)	Hamza Oukali	CB	13 December 1994 (aged 31)	(Algeria) NC Magra
15	(Algeria)	Fateh Talah	CB	30 March 1993 (aged 33)	(Algeria) US Biskra
17	(Algeria)	Billal Boukarroum	RB	19 December 1993 (aged 32)	(Algeria) Olympique Akbou
21	(Algeria)	Rafik Brahimi	LB	15 May 1999 (aged 27)	(Algeria) JS Saoura
23	(Algeria)	Aymene Boualleg	CB	8 May 2001 (aged 25)	(Algeria) ES Mostaganem
27	(Algeria)	Abderahmane Hachoud	RB	2 July 1988 (aged 38)	(Algeria) MC Alger
29	(Algeria)	Mohamed Sari	CB	14 October 2006 (aged 19)	(Algeria) Reserve team
Midfielders
8	(Algeria)	Mohamed Benchaira	DM	10 January 1992 (aged 34)	(Algeria) CS Constantine
20	(Algeria)	Aziz Benabdi	DM	9 August 1993 (aged 33)	Unattached
22	(Algeria)	Housseyn Selmi	DM	11 February 1993 (aged 33)	(Algeria) JS Saoura
25	(Algeria)	Akram Djahnit	AM	3 April 1991 (aged 35)	(Algeria) ES Sétif
Forwards
7	(Algeria)	Adil Djabout	ST	31 December 1992 (aged 33)	(Algeria) NC Magra
9	(Algeria)	Abdeljalil Saâd	ST	12 March 1992 (aged 34)	(Algeria) US Biskra
10	(Algeria)	Youcef Bechou	RW	1 March 1997 (aged 29)	(Algeria) USM El Harrach
11	(Algeria)	Ahmed Zaouache	RW	27 May 1998 (aged 28)	(Algeria) RC Arbaâ
13	(Algeria)	Rayane Gacem	ST	21 January 2003 (aged 23)	(Algeria) JSM Béjaïa
14	(Algeria)	Yanis Allam	ST	11 December 2002 (aged 23)	(Algeria)
18	(Algeria)	Diaa Eddine Mechid	RW	11 June 2006 (aged 20)	(Russia) Dynamo Makhachkala
19	(Algeria)	Lounes Adjout	ST	1 January 2002 (aged 24)	(Algeria) MC El Bayadh
24	(Ivory Coast)	Mohamed Sylla	ST	12 November 2001 (aged 24)	(Algeria) MC Oran
28	(Algeria)	Aymen Baameur	ST	24 July 2006 (aged 20)	(Algeria) Youth team
	(Algeria)	Amdjed Niou	ST	21 November 2007 (aged 18)	(Algeria) IRB Zaouia

== Transfers ==
=== In ===
==== Summer ====
Date	Pos	Player	Moving from	Fee	Source
12 July 2026	CB	(Algeria) M'Hamed Merouani	MC El Bayadh	Free transfer	
12 July 2026	DM	(Algeria) Mohamed Benchaira	CS Constantine	Free transfer	
12 July 2026	RW	(Algeria) Youcef Bechou	USM El Harrach	Free transfer	
13 July 2026	GK	(Algeria) Mohamed Medjadji	MO Béjaïa	Free transfer	
13 July 2026	RB	(Algeria) Billal Boukarroum	Olympique Akbou	Free transfer	
14 July 2026	ST	(Algeria) Lounes Adjout	MC El Bayadh	Free transfer	
2 August 2026	CB	(Algeria) Mohamed Sari	Reserve team	First Professional Contract	
2 August 2026	ST	(Algeria) Amdjed Niou	IRB Zaouia	Free transfer	
3 August 2026	ST	(Algeria) Rayane Gacem	JSM Béjaïa	Free transfer	
5 August 2026	DM	(Algeria) Housseyn Selmi	JS Saoura	Free transfer	
9 August 2026	CB	(Algeria) Aymene Boualleg	ES Mostaganem	Free transfer	
18 August 2026	AM	(Algeria) Akram Djahnit	ES Sétif	Free transfer	
31 August 2026	RW	(Algeria) Diaa Eddine Mechid	(Russia) Dynamo Makhachkala	Undisclosed	

=== Out ===
==== Summer ====
Date	Pos	Player	Moving to	Fee	Source
26 June 2026	LW	(Algeria) Badis Bouamama	JS Kabylie	Free transfer	
26 June 2026	CB	(Algeria) Islam Chahrour	Unattached	Free transfer (Released)	
27 June 2026	DM	(Algeria) Nassim Yattou	Unattached	Free transfer (Released)	
13 July 2026	GK	(Algeria) Dhayfallah Kadri	Unattached	Free transfer (Released)	
17 July 2026	AM	(Algeria) Redouane Bounoua	CR Témouchent	Free transfer	
30 July 2026	ST	(Algeria) Mohamed Souibaâh	NA Hussein Dey	Free transfer	
1 August 2026	ST	(Algeria) Chemseddine Lakehal	ES Sétif	Free transfer	
17 August 2026	CM	(Algeria) Alaaeddine Aissani	NRB Beni Oulbane	Free transfer	
17 August 2026	ST	(Algeria) Chakib Abri	USM Alger	Free transfer	

== Competitions ==
=== Overview ===
Competition	Record								Started round	Final position / round	First match	Last match
Competition	G	W	D	L	GF	GA	GD	Win %	Started round	Final position / round	First match	Last match
Ligue 1	9	1	5	3	8	10	−2	11.11	—N/a	To be confirmed	3 September 2026	In Progress
Algerian Cup	0	0	0	0	0	0	+0	—	Round of 64	To be confirmed	December 2026	In Progress
Total	9	1	5	3	8	10	−2	11.11				

Updated to match played 18 November 2026
Source: Competitions

=== Ligue 1 ===
==== League table ====
Pos	Team	Pld	W	D	L	GF	GA	GD	Pts	Qualification or relegation
10	ES Sétif	9	2	4	3	11	9	+2	10	
11	CS Constantine	10	3	1	6	12	18	−6	10	
12	ES Ben Aknoun	9	1	5	3	8	10	−2	8	
13	ASO Chlef	10	1	5	4	9	13	−4	8	
14	USM Khenchela	10	1	4	5	5	12	−7	7	Relegation to Algerian League 2

Updated to match(es) played on 20 November 2026. Source: lfp.dz
Rules for classification: 1) Points; 2) Head-to-head points; 3) Head-to-head goal difference; 4) First half goal difference; 5) First half total goals; 6) Fairplay ranking; 7) Playoff.

==== Results summary ====
Overall								Home						Away					
Pld	W	D	L	GF	GA	GD	Pts	W	D	L	GF	GA	GD	W	D	L	GF	GA	GD
9	1	5	3	9	8	+1	8	0	2	1	4	5	−1	1	3	2	5	3	+2

Last updated: 18 November 2026.
Source: Competitive matches

==== Results by round ====
Round	1	2	3	4	5	6	7	8	9	10	11	12	13	14	15	16	17	18	19	20	21	22	23	24	25	26	27	28	29	30
Ground	A	H	A	H	A	H	A	A	H	A	H	A	H	A	H	H	A	H	A	H	A	H	H	A	H	A	H	A	H	A
Result	W	D	D	D	L		D	D	L	L																				
Position	3																													

Updated to match(es) played on 18 November 2026. Source: Competitive matches
A = Away; H = Home; W = Win; D = Draw; L = Loss

==== Matches ====
The league fixtures were announced on 3 August 2026.

All times are local, WAT (UTC+1).

Win Draw Loss Postponed

3 September 2026 Round 1	ES Sétif	0–1	ES Ben Aknoun	Sétif
19:00		Flashscore; LFP	Adjout 78'	Stadium: 8 May 1945 Stadium; Referee: Alaa Bouab

10 September 2026 Round 2	ES Ben Aknoun	2–2	US Biskra	Belouizdad
19:00	Djabout 5'; Bechou 88'	Flashscore; LFP	Belkhadem 19'; Saindou 45+5'	Stadium: 20 August 1955 Stadium; Referee: Fateh Harkat

18 September 2026 Round 3	USM Khenchela	1–1	ES Ben Aknoun	Khenchela
16:00	Benzid 62'	Flashscore; LFP	Benchaira 84'	Stadium: Amar Hamam Stadium; Referee: Rafiq Aouina

7 October 2026 Round 4	ES Ben Aknoun	2–2	JS El Biar	Belouizdad
18:00	Benchaira 19'; Adjout 49'	Flashscore; LFP	Mouaki 74'; Guemroud 61'	Stadium: 20 August 1955 Stadium; Referee: Mustapha Ghorbal

14 October 2026 Round 5	Olympique Akbou	2–1	ES Ben Aknoun	Akbou
15:00	Zaalani 55'; Messiad 58'	Flashscore; LFP	Tamimi 4'	Stadium: Martyrs Stadium; Referee: Tahar Boudjemaa

24 October 2026 Round 7	JS Saoura	0–0	ES Ben Aknoun	Béchar
18:00		Flashscore; LFP		Stadium: 20 August 1955 Stadium; Referee: Yahia Dahar

31 October 2026 Round 8	MB Rouissat	1–1	ES Ben Aknoun	Ouargla
17:45	Derder 31'	Flashscore; LFP	Adjout 48'	Stadium: 18 February Stadium; Referee: Abdelali Ibrir

8 November 2026 Round 9	ES Ben Aknoun	0–1	CR Belouizdad	Belouizdad
17:45		Flashscore; LFP	Benayada 51'	Stadium: 20 August 1955 Stadium; Referee: Tayeb Benyabka

18 November 2026 Round 10	CS Constantine	1–0	ES Ben Aknoun	Constantine
17:45	L'Ghoul 44'	Flashscore; LFP		Stadium: Chahid Hamlaoui Stadium; Referee: Abdennour Khalfallah

23 November 2026 Round 6	ES Ben Aknoun	–	USM Alger	Belouizdad
17:45		Flashscore; LFP		Stadium: 20 August 1955 Stadium; Referee: Yahia Dahar

1 December 2026 Round 11	ES Ben Aknoun	–	MC Oran	Belouizdad
17:00		Flashscore; LFP		Stadium: 20 August 1955 Stadium

Round 12	JS Kabylie	–	ES Ben Aknoun	Tizi Ouzou
:		Flashscore; LFP		Stadium: Hocine Aït Ahmed Stadium

Round 13	ES Ben Aknoun	–	MC Alger	Belouizdad
:		Flashscore; LFP		Stadium: 20 August 1955 Stadium

Round 14	CR Témouchent	–	ES Ben Aknoun	Aïn Témouchent
:		Flashscore; LFP		Stadium: Omar Oucief Stadium

Round 15	ES Ben Aknoun	–	ASO Chlef	Belouizdad
:		Flashscore; LFP		Stadium: 20 August 1955 Stadium

Round 16	ES Ben Aknoun	–	ES Sétif	Belouizdad
:		Flashscore; LFP		Stadium: 20 August 1955 Stadium

Round 17	US Biskra	–	ES Ben Aknoun	Zeribet El Oued
:		Flashscore; LFP		Stadium: Bouhafs Chabi Stadium

Round 18	ES Ben Aknoun	–	USM Khenchela	Belouizdad
:		Flashscore; LFP		Stadium: 20 August 1955 Stadium

Round 19	JS El Biar	–	ES Ben Aknoun	Blida
:		Flashscore; LFP		Stadium: Mustapha Tchaker Stadium

Round 20	ES Ben Aknoun	–	Olympique Akbou	Belouizdad
:		Flashscore; LFP		Stadium: 20 August 1955 Stadium

Round 21	USM Alger	–	ES Ben Aknoun	Algiers
:		Flashscore; LFP		Stadium: Stade du 5 Juillet

Round 22	ES Ben Aknoun	–	JS Saoura	Belouizdad
:		Flashscore; LFP		Stadium: 20 August 1955 Stadium

Round 23	ES Ben Aknoun	–	MB Rouissat	Belouizdad
:		Flashscore; LFP		Stadium: 20 August 1955 Stadium

Round 24	CR Belouizdad	–	ES Ben Aknoun	Baraki
:		Flashscore; LFP		Stadium: Nelson Mandela Stadium

Round 25	ES Ben Aknoun	–	CS Constantine	Belouizdad
:		Flashscore; LFP		Stadium: 20 August 1955 Stadium

Round 26	MC Oran	–	ES Ben Aknoun	Bir El Djir
:		Flashscore; LFP		Stadium: Miloud Hadefi Stadium

Round 27	ES Ben Aknoun	–	JS Kabylie	Belouizdad
:		Flashscore; LFP		Stadium: 20 August 1955 Stadium

Round 28	MC Alger	–	ES Ben Aknoun	Douéra
:		Flashscore; LFP		Stadium: Ali La Pointe Stadium

Round 29	ES Ben Aknoun	–	CR Témouchent	Belouizdad
:		Flashscore; LFP		Stadium: 20 August 1955 Stadium

Round 30	ASO Chlef	–	ES Ben Aknoun	Chlef
:		Flashscore; LFP		Stadium: Mohamed Boumezrag Stadium

=== Algerian Cup ===
December 2026 Round of 64	–
:

== Squad information ==
=== Appearances and goals ===
As of 18 November 2026

No.	Pos	Player	Nat	Ligue 1			Algerian Cup			Total		
No.	Pos	Player	Nat	App	St	G	App	St	G	App	St	G
Goalkeepers
1	GK	Mohamed Medjadji	(Algeria)	0	0	0	0	0	0	0	0	0
16	GK	Kheireddine Boussouf	(Algeria)	9	9	0	0	0	0	0	0	0
30	GK	Amayas Boudedja	(Algeria)	0	0	0	0	0	0	0	0	0
Defenders
2	RB	Aymen Chaaraoui	(Algeria)	8	7	0	0	0	0	0	0	0
3	CB	Abdelkader Tamimi	(Algeria)	9	9	1	0	0	0	0	0	0
4	CB	M'Hamed Merouani	(Algeria)	0	0	0	0	0	0	0	0	0
5	CB	Hamza Oukali	(Algeria)	9	8	0	0	0	0	0	0	0
15	CB	Fateh Talah	(Algeria)	9	9	0	0	0	0	0	0	0
17	RB	Billal Boukarroum	(Algeria)	3	2	0	0	0	0	0	0	0
21	LB	Rafik Brahimi	(Algeria)	6	3	0	0	0	0	0	0	0
23	CB	Aymene Boualleg	(Algeria)	2	1	0	0	0	0	0	0	0
27	RB	Abderahmane Hachoud	(Algeria)	7	6	0	0	0	0	0	0	0
29	CB	Mohamed Sari	(Algeria)	0	0	0	0	0	0	0	0	0
Midfielders
8	DM	Mohamed Benchaira	(Algeria)	9	9	2	0	0	0	0	0	0
20	DM	Aziz Benabdi	(Algeria)	6	6	0	0	0	0	0	0	0
22	DM	Housseyn Selmi	(Algeria)	7	3	0	0	0	0	0	0	0
25	AM	Akram Djahnit	(Algeria)	5	2	0	0	0	0	0	0	0
Forwards
7	ST	Adil Djabout	(Algeria)	9	6	1	0	0	0	0	0	0
9	ST	Abdeljalil Saâd	(Algeria)	9	8	0	0	0	0	0	0	0
10	RW	Youcef Bechou	(Algeria)	3	0	1	0	0	0	0	0	0
11	RW	Ahmed Zaouache	(Algeria)	9	3	0	0	0	0	0	0	0
13	ST	Rayane Gacem	(Algeria)	4	1	0	0	0	0	0	0	0
14	ST	Yanis Allam	(Algeria)	0	0	0	0	0	0	0	0	0
18	RW	Diaa Eddine Mechid	(Algeria)	4	0	0	0	0	0	0	0	0
19	ST	Lounes Adjout	(Algeria)	9	7	2	0	0	0	0	0	0
24	ST	Mohamed Sylla	(Algeria)	0	0	0	0	0	0	0	0	0
28	ST	Aymen Baameur	(Algeria)	0	0	0	0	0	0	0	0	0
	ST	Amdjed Niou	(Algeria)	0	0	0	0	0	0	0	0	0
Total				9		8	0		0	0		0

Last updated: 18 November 2026
Source: soccerway.com

=== Goalscorers ===
As of 18 November 2026

Includes all competitive matches.

No.	Nat.	Player	Pos.	L1	AC	TOTAL
19	(Algeria)	Lounes Adjout	ST	3	0	3
8	(Algeria)	Mohamed Benchaira	DM	2	0	2
7	(Algeria)	Adil Djabout	ST	1	0	1
10	(Algeria)	Youcef Bechou	RW	1	0	1
3	(Algeria)	Abdelkader Tamimi	CB	1	0	1
Own Goals				0	0	0
Totals				8	0	8

=== Clean sheets ===
As of 18 November 2026

Includes all competitive matches.

					Clean sheets		
No.	Nat	Name	GP	GA	L1	AC	Total
1	(Algeria)	Mohamed Medjadji	0	0	0	0	0
16	(Algeria)	Kheireddine Boussouf	9	10	2	0	2
30	(Algeria)	Amayas Boudedja	0	0	0	0	0
		TOTALS		10	2	0	2
