= ES Sétif–USM Alger rivalry =

Football rivalry in Algeria

- Other names: ES Sétif vs USM Alger
- Location: Algeria (Algiers and Sétif), Africa
- Teams: ES Sétif; USM Alger
- First meeting: ES Sétif 4–2 USM Alger; Algerian Cup (31 March 1963)
- Latest meeting: USM Alger 2–0 ES Sétif; Ligue 1 (18 March 2026)
- Broadcasters: EPTV Terrestre
- Stadiums: Stade du 5 Juillet USM Alger; Stade 8 Mai 1945 ES Sétif

Statistics
- Total meetings: 96
- Most wins: USM Alger (39)
- Most player appearances: Akram Djahnit (26)
- Top scorer: Isâad Bourahli (7)
- All-time series: ES Sétif: 36; Drawn: 21; USM Alger: 39
- Largest victory: USM Alger 4–0 ES Sétif; Division 1 (7 November 2002)

The ES Sétif–USM Alger rivalry is a football rivalry between Sétif-based ES Sétif and USM Alger of Algiers. The two clubs together won 42 titles from the Ligue Professionnelle 1, Algerian Cup and Super Cup at the local level, Regionally the Arab Champions League And internationally in CAF Champions League, CAF Super Cup and the defunct Afro-Asian Club Championship.

== History ==
=== The beginning (1958–1977) ===
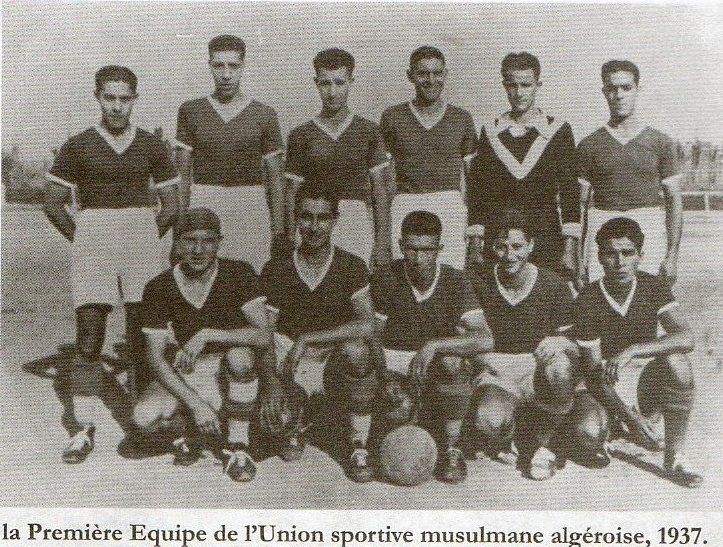
USM Alger's team during their first season 1937–38.

Union sportive de la médina d'Alger is an Algerian professional football club based in Algiers, Algiers Province. The club was formed in Casbah in 1937 as Union Sportive Musulmane d'Alger, as for Entente Sportive Sétifienne based in Sétif, Sétif Province. The club was formed in 1958 as Entente Sportive Sétifienne, It is the second Algerian club created during the revolution after the Entente Sportive de Collo (in 1957). ES Sétif and USM Alger are considered among the most successful Algerian football teams, especially since the beginning of the era of professionalism 2010–11 season. They are the first champions of Algeria in the Algerian Cup and the championship season 1962–63. The first official meeting between the two teams was in the semi-finald of the Algerian Cup in 1963, which ended with the victory of ES Sétif 4–2. The first match in the league tournament was during the 1964–65 season, which ended with the victory of ESS with a single goal.

=== First professional era (1977–1989) ===
In 1977, a major sports reform was introduced by the Ministry of Youth and Sports, aimed at providing elite clubs with a solid financial foundation to help them operate more professionally. Clubs were restructured under a new status called Association Sportive de Performances (ASP), granting them greater autonomy in management and encouraging the creation of their own training centers. As part of this reform, ES Sétif became sponsored by the national hydrocarbon company Sonatrach and subsequently changed its name to Entente Pétrolière de Sétif (EPS). In 1984, following a shift in sponsorship to the national plastics company, the club was renamed again as Entente Plastique de Sétif (EPS).

Similarly, USM Alger came under the sponsorship of Société nationale de l'électricité et du gaz (Sonelgaz), and the club’s name was changed to Union sportive kahraba d'Alger (USK Alger), with (Arabic: كهرباء, kahraba) meaning electricity in Arabic. During this period, matches between USM Alger and ES Sétif were relatively uneventful and sporadic, due in large part to the two clubs’ frequent relegations to the second division. However, the two sides did meet in the 1980 Algerian cup final, where ES Sétif secured its fifth cup title with a 1–0 victory marking the seventh final defeat for USMA.

In 1988, ES Sétif made history by winning the African Cup of Champions Clubs for the first time, remarkably while competing from the second division. After a narrow 1–0 defeat away to Nigeria’s Iwuanyanwu Nationale in the first leg, ES Sétif triumphed 4–0 in the return leg at the Stade du 17 Juin in Constantine. Following this continental success, they went on to face Al Sadd SC in the final of the Afro-Asian Club Championship and claimed the title a unique achievement in Algerian football history.

=== Second professional era (since 2010) ===
==== Control of the Ligue 1 & Champions League Title for ES Sétif ====
I want to make this club the best in the country. The USMA is a great team and we will naturally have to play to win titles, that's the least. Personally, I will do my best to ensure that the club does not miss anything on a daily basis. We have many projects and we are very keen to achieve them.

— Ali Haddad a statement about his ambitions with the team.

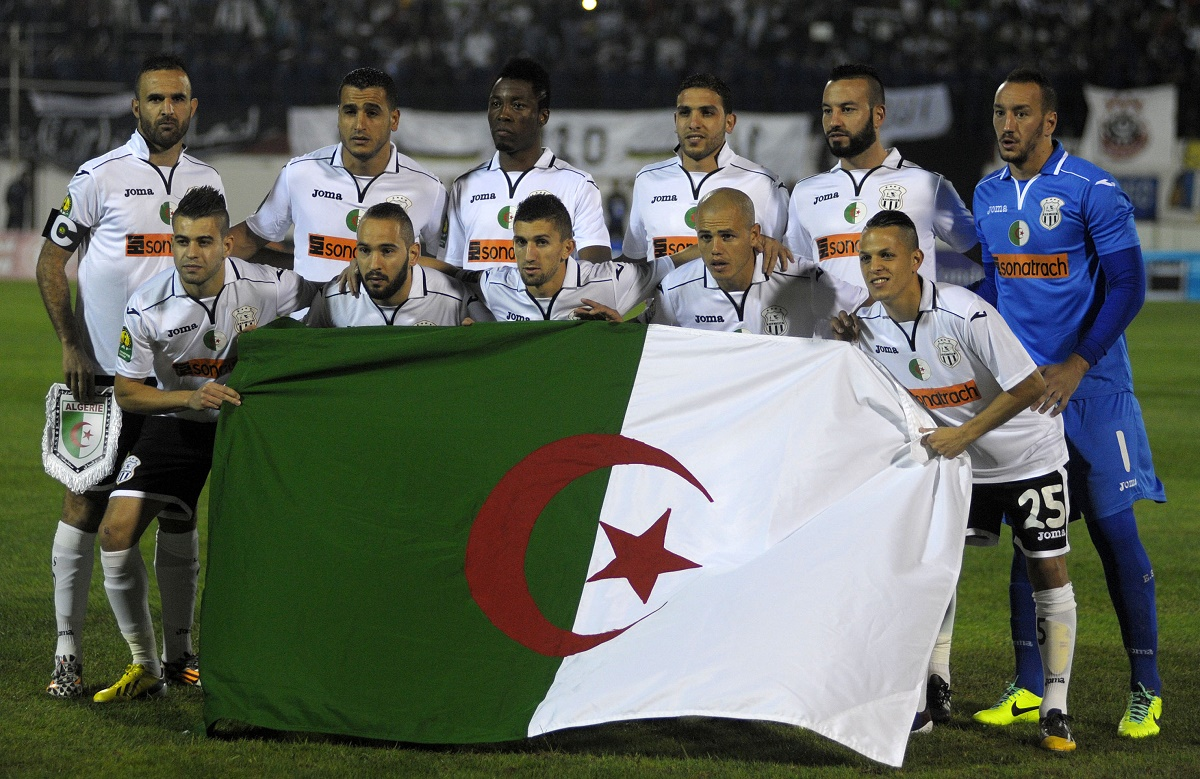
ES Sétif team the first Algerian club to win CAF Champions League in its new edition in 2014.

It was decided by the Ligue de Football Professionnel (LFP) and the Algerian Football Federation (FAF) to professionalize the Algerian football championship starting with the 2010–11 season. Until then, all Algerian football clubs held semi-professional status, but with this reform, they were officially recognized as professional clubs. FAF president Mohamed Raouraoua, since the start of his term, had advocated for this move toward professionalism. USM Alger became the first professional club in Algeria after businessman Ali Haddad invested 700 million Algerian dinars to purchase an 83% ownership stake in the club.

Since the beginning of this professional era, both USM Alger and ES Sétif dominated domestic competition, winning all Ligue 1 titles between them except for the inaugural professional season, which was won by ASO Chlef. This domination continued through to the 2016–17 season. The two clubs also faced each other in the Algerian Super Cup final for the first time in 2014, with USM Alger claiming a 2–0 victory thanks to goals from Ziaya and Andria. In 2014, ES Sétif secured their first CAF Champions League title in the competition’s modern era, becoming the first Algerian team to do so. A year later, USM Alger reached the final but fell short of their first continental crown after being defeated by TP Mazembe.

During that same Champions League campaign, the two Algerian giants met in the group stage the first time two Algerian clubs had faced each other in a continental competition. The first leg match, played on a Ramadan night, saw USM Alger win 2–1. In the second leg, USM Alger triumphed again with a 3–0 victory their fifth consecutive win to secure top spot in the group and qualify for the semi-finals.

==== New Ownership for Both Clubs: Groupe SERPORT & Sonelgaz ====
On 28 February 2018, Ali Haddad replaced his brother Rabouh as USM Alger's general manager, appointing former international player and ex-ES Sétif president Abdelhakim Serrar to the position. In the 2018–19 Algerian Cup on 22 January 2019, USM Alger and ES Sétif met for the first time in 12 years at the Stade 8 Mai 1945, with ES Sétif winning 3–1 their first cup victory over USMA since 1980. On 26 May 2019, USM Alger secured its eighth Ligue 1 title after a 3–1 away win against CS Constantine. Immediately following the match, Serrar announced his resignation. On 2 March 2020, after the imprisonment of former president Rabouh Haddad and ahead of a planned shareholders' general assembly on 12 March 2020, Groupe SERPORT officially acquired 94.34% of USM Alger's shares from ETRHB Haddad.

On 9 June 2022, while USM Alger players were released for a day by Algeria A' national team coach Madjid Bougherra, USMA player Billel Benhammouda tragically died in a traffic accident near Douaouda and Bou Ismaïl. His death was confirmed after DNA testing. The team, preparing to travel to Sétif for their final match of the 2021–22 season, returned to Algiers upon hearing the news. The Ligue de Football Professionnel (LFP) postponed the match due to the players' psychological state, and the rescheduled fixture was played with reserves and U19 players.

I hope that this project will be done as soon as possible, confided the first manager of the Sonelgaz group. I am the first supporter of ES Sétif. Congratulations to the wilaya of Sétif. We hope for many titles in the future. The team has a game to play on Wednesday and we hope they will win it to be on the podium.

— Statement by the CEO of Sonelgaz regarding the purchase of the majority of shares in ES Setif.

On 22 August 2022, former ES Sétif captain Akram Djahnit left the club after 12 years and joined USM Alger. Djahnit had submitted his case to the National Dispute Resolution Chamber, which ruled in his favor, allowing him to terminate his contract. On 3 June 2023, USM Alger won the CAF Confederation Cup, becoming the first Algerian club to win the competition and securing the first international title in its history, after defeating Young Africans.

On 29 May 2023, the CEO of Sonelgaz traveled to Sétif to meet with the Wali of Sétif and ES Sétif's management to finalize the acquisition of the club. On 27 July 2023, ESS Black Eagles held an extraordinary general assembly ratified the resignation of the Board of Directors, including that of president Abdelhakim Serrar, officially transferring full ownership of the club to Sonelgaz. On 15 September 2023, USM Alger won its second continental title by claiming the CAF Super Cup after defeating Al Ahly, the second CAF Super Cup title for an Algerian club, after ES Sétif’s first win in 2015.

== All-time head-to-head results ==
As of 18 March 2026

Tournament	GP	UV	D	EV	GoalU	GoalE
Ligue Professionnelle 1	84	34	19	31	107	103
Algerian Cup	8	2	1	5	8	14
League Cup	1	0	1	0	0	0
Super Cup	1	1	0	0	2	0
Champions League	2	2	0	0	5	1
TOTAL	96	39	21	36	122	118

GP: Games Played
UV: USM Alger Victory
D: Draw
EV: ES Sétif Victory
GoalU: USM Alger Goals
GoalJ: ES Sétif Goals

== All-Time Top Scorers ==
Player	Club	Ligue 1	Algerian Cup	Super Cup	International	Total
(Algeria) Isâad Bourahli	ES Sétif, USM Alger	7	—	—	—	7
(Algeria) Abdelmalek Ziaya	ES Sétif, USM Alger	5	—	1	—	6
(Algeria) Farès Fellahi	ES Sétif	5	—	—	—	5
(Algeria) Farouk Chafaï	USM Alger	4	—	—	—	4
(Algeria) Nabil Hemani	ES Sétif	4	—	—	—	4
(Algeria) Hamid Rahmouni	ES Sétif	4	—	—	—	4
(Algeria) Rabie Benchergui	USM Alger	4	—	—	—	4

== All-Time Top appearances ==
Bold Still playing competitive football in Algeria
since 1995–96 season.
Statistics correct as of game on 18 March 2026

Player	Club	Ligue 1	Algerian Cup	Super Cup	CAF	Total
(Algeria) Akram Djahnit	ES Sétif, USM Alger	23	1	1	1	26
(Algeria) Mohamed Lamine Zemmamouche	USM Alger	19	2	1	1	23
(Algeria) Karim Ghazi	USM Alger	17	2	—	—	19
(Algeria) Hocine Achiou	USM Alger	15	2	—	—	17
(Algeria) Mohamed Hamdoud	USM Alger	14	2	—	—	16
(Algeria) Sofiane Khedairia	ES Sétif	12	1	1	2	16
(Algeria) Billel Dziri	USM Alger	14	1	—	—	15

== Honours ==
USM Alger	Championship	ES Sétif
International (Official)
–	CAF Champions League	2
2	CAF Confederation Cup	–
–	Afro-Asian Club Championship (Defunct)	1
1	CAF Super Cup	1
3	Aggregate	4
Domestic (Official)
8	Algerian Ligue Professionnelle 1	8
10	Algerian Cup	8
2	Algerian Super Cup	1
20	Aggregate	17
International (Non-official)
1	Arab Champions League	2
24	Total Aggregate	23

== League matches ==
#	Date	Home team	Score	Away team	Goals (home)	Goals (away)
1	10 Jan 1965	USM Alger	0 – 1	ES Sétif	—	
2	30 May 1965	ES Sétif	2 – 0	USM Alger		—
3	26 Oc 1969	ES Sétif	1 – 2	USM Alger		
4	15 Feb 1970	USM Alger	3 – 1	ES Sétif		
5	22 Nov 1970	ES Sétif	2 – 2	USM Alger		
6	4 Apr 1971	USM Alger	2 – 1	ES Sétif		
7	12 Dec 1971	WR Sétif	2 – 1	USM Alger		
8	21 May 1972	WR Sétif	1 – 0	USM Alger		
9	15 Dec 1974	USM Alger	2 – 0	ES Sétif		
10	20 Apr 1975	ES Sétif	0 – 0	USM Alger	—	—
11	9 Nov 1975	ES Sétif	0 – 0	USM Alger	—	—
12	9 May 1976	USM Alger	3 – 2	ES Sétif		
13	24 Sep 1976	ES Sétif	2 – 0	USM Alger		—
14	28 Jan 1977	USM Alger	1 – 1	ES Sétif		
15	9 Dec 1977	USK Alger	2 – 1	EP Sétif		
16	28 Apr 1978	EP Sétif	2 – 1	USK Alger		
17	20 Oct 1978	USK Alger	0 – 0	EP Sétif	—	—
18	9 Mar 1979	EP Sétif	2 – 1	USK Alger		
19	1 Feb 1980	EP Sétif	2 – 1	USK Alger		
20	30 May 1980	USK Alger	2 – 1	EP Sétif		
21	11 Dec 1981	EP Sétif	4 – 1	USK Alger		
22	May 1982	USK Alger	1 – 1	EP Sétif		
23	22 Oct 1982	USK Alger	2 – 1	EP Sétif	Guedioura 1', Diab 90'	Khalfa 39'
24	28 Jan 1983	EP Sétif	2 – 0	USK Alger	Saoud 59', Adjissa 76'	—
25	31 Dec 1987	EP Sétif	2 – 0	USK Alger		—
26	20 Jun 1988	USK Alger	2 – 0	EP Sétif	Mouaci 80', Hadj Adlane 88'	—
27	12 Oct 1989	USM Alger	0 – 1	ES Sétif	—	Rahmouni 26'
28	29 Mar 1990	ES Sétif	3 – 0	USM Alger	Zorgane 43', Benjaballah 46', 74'	—
29	8 Jan 1997	USM Alger	2 – 0	ES Sétif	Zouani 70', Zekri 88'	—
30	23 Apr 1998	ES Sétif	1 – 3	USM Alger	Rahmouni 23'	Hadj Adlane 31', Khouni 34', Zouani 38'
31	18 Nov 1999	ES Sétif	2 – 1	USM Alger	Fellahi 38', 67'	Ghoul 75'
32	18 May 2000	USM Alger	1 – 2	ES Sétif	Yacef 58' (pen.)	Rahmouni 33', 40'
33	23 Nov 2000	ES Sétif	1 – 1	USM Alger	Keraghel 54'	Maouche 25'
34	9 Apr 2001	USM Alger	2 – 1	ES Sétif	Djahnine 47', 79'	Bourahli 85' (pen.)
35	22 Nov 2001	USM Alger	2 – 0	ES Sétif	Benchergui 79', Bourahli 83'	—
36	20 May 2002	ES Sétif	2 – 1	USM Alger	Fellahi 4' (pen.), Zorgan 98'	Deghiche 54'
37	7 Nov 2002	USM Alger	4 – 0	ES Sétif	Ouichaoui 13', Achiou 30', Ammour 66', Deghiche 78'	—
38	20 Mar 2003	ES Sétif	0 – 0	USM Alger	—	—
39	8 Dec 2003	USM Alger	2 – 1	ES Sétif	Ghazi 23', Benchergui 85'	Abaci 20'
40	26 Mar 2004	ES Sétif	3 – 0	USM Alger	Fellahi 30', Bourahli 48', 69'	—
41	4 Nov 2004	ES Sétif	1 – 2	USM Alger	Fellahi 85'	Achiou 70', Dziri 88'
42	18 Apr 2005	USM Alger	3 – 2	ES Sétif	Benchergui 15', 68', Ghazi 45'	Sessay 46', 90'
43	17 Nov 2005	USM Alger	2 – 0	ES Sétif	Dziri 70', Eneramo 90'	—
44	30 Mar 2006	ES Sétif	2 – 1	USM Alger	Hadj Aïssa 26', Bourahli 42'	Haddou 60' (pen.)
45	31 Aug 2006	ES Sétif	2 – 0	USM Alger	Ziaya 45', Bourahli 72'	—
46	1 Feb 2007	USM Alger	0 – 0	ES Sétif	—	—
47	9 Nov 2007	ES Sétif	2 – 1	USM Alger	Ziaya 21', 59'	Bourahli 12'
48	31 Mar 2008	USM Alger	1 – 0	ES Sétif	Achiou 80'	—
49	11 Sep 2008	ES Sétif	1 – 1	USM Alger	Hemani 13'	Rial 27'
50	6 Mar 2009	USM Alger	1 – 0	ES Sétif	Ammour 84'	—
51	29 Sep 2009	ES Sétif	2 – 2	USM Alger	Laïfaoui 22', Aksas 80'	Rial 26', Daham 39'
52	9 Apr 2010	USM Alger	2 – 0	ES Sétif	Daham 64', Hamidi 90'	—
53	25 Sep 2010	USM Alger	1 – 2	ES Sétif	Daham 4'	Hemani 44', Metref 48'
54	30 Apr 2011	ES Sétif	2 – 0	USM Alger	Hemani 33', 66'	—
55	24 Dec 2011	ES Sétif	3 – 2	USM Alger	Laïfaoui 8' (o.g.), Aoudia 59', Benmoussa 90+7' (pen.)	Djediat 44' (pen.), 69'
56	19 May 2012	USM Alger	2 – 0	ES Sétif	Benaldjia 8', 73'	—
57	16 Oct 2012	ES Sétif	1 – 0	USM Alger	Karaoui 73'	—
58	19 Feb 2013	USM Alger	1 – 0	ES Sétif	Ziaya 6' (pen.)	—
59	28 Dec 2013	ES Sétif	1 – 1	USM Alger	Madouni 90+4'	Feham 63'
60	22 May 2014	USM Alger	2 – 2	ES Sétif	Seguer 8', Ferhat 76'	Djahnit 20', Nadji 88'
61	16 Aug 2014	USM Alger	1 – 1	ES Sétif	Meftah 47' (pen.)	Djahnit 15' (pen.)
62	20 Jan 2015	ES Sétif	3 – 2	USM Alger	Dagoulou 26', 52', Ziaya 64'	Boudebouda 43', Nadji 81'
63	25 Aug 2015	USM Alger	2 – 1	ES Sétif	Khoualed 26', Belaïli 39'	Benyettou 90+4' (pen.)
64	23 Jan 2016	ES Sétif	1 – 1	USM Alger	Arroussi 43'	Chafaï 26'
65	9 Dec 2016	USM Alger	3 – 1	ES Sétif	Chafaï 12', Meftah 25', Meziane 78'	Amada 57' (pen.)
66	10 Jun 2017	ES Sétif	2 – 1	USM Alger	Djahnit 5', Djabou 52'	Sayoud 75'
67	12 Dec 2017	ES Sétif	1 – 2	USM Alger	Benayad 54'	Darfalou 5', Chafaï 75'
68	13 Mar 2018	USM Alger	3 – 2	ES Sétif	Darfalou 8' (pen.), Koudri 50', Chafaï 82'	Banouh 83', 90+2'
69	29 Nov 2018	USM Alger	0 – 1	ES Sétif	—	Bedrane 15'
70	21 Apr 2019	ES Sétif	1 – 1	USM Alger	Radouani 74'	Ellafi 42'
71	15 Aug 2019	USM Alger	2 – 1	ES Sétif	Meftah 45+3', Khemaissia 90+4'	Bouguelmouna 34'
72	4 Febr 2020	ES Sétif	3 – 1	USM Alger	Laribi 45+1', Ghacha 56', Kendouci 58'	Zouari 90+4'
73	28 Nov 2020	USM Alger	0 – 2	ES Sétif	—	Amoura 87', 90+2'
74	4 May 2021	ES Sétif	1 – 1	USM Alger	Ghacha 80' (pen.)	Benhammouda 56'
75	5 Feb 2022	USM Alger	1 – 0	ES Sétif	Mahious 16' (pen.)	—
76	17 Jun 2022	ES Sétif	3 – 1	USM Alger	Benayad 4', 66', Bakrar 44' (pen.)	Belharrane 27'
77	3 Dec 2022	USM Alger	1 – 1	ES Sétif	Zouari 76'	Kendouci 68'
78	8 Apr 2023	ES Sétif	1 – 0	USM Alger	Bouchama 59'	—
79	14 Nov 2023	ES Sétif	2 – 1	USM Alger	Lahmeri 16' (pen.), Aggoun 49'	Yahia 28' (o.g.)
80	19 Mar 2024	USM Alger	2 – 0	ES Sétif	Bacha 34', Kanou 59'	—
81	21 Dec 2024	ES Sétif	1 – 1	USM Alger	Bouchama 90+10'	Ghacha 30'
82	16 Jun 2025	USM Alger	1 – 0	ES Sétif	Ghacha 85'	—
83	29 Oct 2025	ES Sétif	1 – 3	USM Alger	Djahnit 62' (pen.)	Benzaza 19', Draoui 21', Bousseliou 82'
84	18 Mar 2026	USM Alger	2 – 0	ES Sétif	Mahrouz 9', Dehiri 34'	—

== Algerian Cup results ==
#	Date	Round	Home team	Score	Away team	Goals (home)	Goals (away)
1	31 Mar 1963	SF	ES Sétif	4 – 2 (a.e.t.)	USM Alger	Kharchi 79', Khemicha 90', 96', Koussim 106'	Meziani 11', Bernaoui 23'
2	28 Mar 1964	SF	USM Alger	2 – 3	ES Sétif	Krimo 56', Meziani 59'	Messaoudi II 50', Khemicha 75', Mattem II 79'
3	7 May 1967	SF (1L)	USM Alger	1 – 1	ES Sétif		
4	21 May 1967	SF (2L)	ES Sétif	2 – 0	USM Alger		—
5	19 Jun 1980	Final	EP Sétif	1 – 0	USK Alger	Arabat 68'	—
6	5 Feb 2002	R64	USM Alger	1 – 0	ES Sétif	Ouichaoui 19'	—
7	24 May 2007	QF	USM Alger	1 – 0	ES Sétif	Doucoure 85'	—
8	22 Jan 2019	R16	ES Sétif	3 – 1	USM Alger	Bedrane 3', Ferhani 51', Djabou 79'	Cherifi 48' (pen.)

== Super Cup results ==
#	Date	Round	Home team	Score	Away team	Goals (home)	Goals (away)
1	11 Jan 2014	Final	ES Sétif	0 – 2	USM Alger	—	Ziaya 8', Andria 40'

== League Cup results ==
#	Date	Round	Home team	Score	Away team	Goals (home)	Goals (away)
1	10 Feb 2000	Round of 16	USM Alger	0 – 0 (pen. 3–1)	ES Sétif	—	—

== International results ==
#	Season	Round		Home team	Score	Away team	Goals (home)	Goals (away)
1	2015 Champions League	Group stage	1st leg	ES Sétif	1–2	USM Alger	Korbiaa 84'	Seguer 60', Khoualed 72'
2	2015 Champions League	Group stage	2nd leg	USM Alger	3–0	ES Sétif	Belaïli 33', Beldjilali 37', Aoudia 74'	—

== Shared player history ==
=== Players who have played for both clubs ===
- (Algeria) Hamza Aït Ouamar (USM Alger 2009–11, ES Sétif 2016–18)
- (Algeria) Farouk Belkaïd (USM Alger 2005–06, ES Sétif 2008–13)
- (Algeria) Antar Boucherit (USM Alger 2006–08, ES Sétif 2010–11)
- (Algeria) Abdelhamid Kermali (USM Alger 1951–52, ES Sétif 1966–67)
- (Algeria) Ahmed Gasmi (USM Alger 2012–14, ES Sétif 2014–15)
- (Algeria) Azzedine Rahim (USM Alger 1987–2000, ES Sétif 2003–04)
- (Algeria) Mokhtar Benmoussa (ES Sétif 2010–12, USM Alger 2012–19)
- (Algeria) Rafik Bouderbal (ES Sétif 2009–10, USM Alger 2016–19)
- (Algeria) Khaled Lemmouchia (ES Sétif 2006–11, USM Alger 2011–12)
- (Algeria) Abdelkader Laïfaoui (ES Sétif 2007–11, USM Alger 2011–15)
- (Algeria) Saâdi Radouani (USM Alger 2015–16 & 2020–present, ES Sétif 2018–20)
- (Algeria) Messala Merbah (ES Sétif 2020–21, USM Alger 2021–23)
- (Algeria) Bouazza Feham (ES Sétif 2008–11, USM Alger 2011–15)
- (Algeria) Lamouri Djediat (ES Sétif 2007–10, USM Alger 2011–14)
- (Algeria) Adel Maïza (ES Sétif 2005–08, USM Alger 2012)
- (Algeria) Farès Mecheri (ES Sétif 2007–08, USM Alger 2008–09)
- (Algeria) Rachid Nadji (ES Sétif 2011–14 & 2016–18, USM Alger 2014–16)
- (Algeria) Mohamed Seguer (ES Sétif 2008–10, USM Alger 2012–16)
- (Algeria) Mohamed Yekhlef (ES Sétif 2005–11, USM Alger 2011–13)
- (Algeria) Abdelmalek Ziaya (ES Sétif 2005–10 & 2014–16, USM Alger 2013–14)
- (Algeria) Isâad Bourahli (ES Sétif 1992–95 & 1998–01 & 2003–04 & 2005–07, USM Alger 2001–03 & 2004–05 & 2007–10)
- (Algeria) Ibrahim Bekakchi (USM Alger 2011–14 & 2021–23, ES Sétif 2019–21)
- (Algeria) Akram Djahnit (ES Sétif 2010–15 & 2016–22, USM Alger 2022–present)

=== Coaches who managed both clubs ===
- (Algeria) Azzedine Aït Djoudi (USM Alger 2002–03, ES Sétif 2008–09)
- (France) Hubert Velud (ES Sétif 2012–13, USM Alger 2013–15)
- (Algeria) Noureddine Saâdi (USM Alger 1996–97 & 2000–02 & 2004–05 & 2009–10, ES Sétif 2007)
- (Algeria) Rabah Saâdane (USM Alger 1999–2000, ES Sétif 2006–07)
- (Algeria) Abdelhak Benchikha (ES Sétif 2018, USM Alger 2022–23)

== Algerian Ligue Professionnelle 1 results ==
The tables list the place each team took in each of the seasons.

	64–65	65–66	66–67	67–68	68–69	69–70	70–71	71–72	72–73	73–74	74–75	75–76	76–77	77–78	78–79	79–80	80–81	81–82
No. of teams	16	16	12	12	12	12	12	16	16	16	16	16	14	14	14	16	15	16
USM Alger	16	x	x	x	x	5	5	15	x	x	5	4	11	5	12	15	x	9
ES Sétif	6	6	5	1	7	10	11	5	10	7	8	5	10	3	6	4	3	3

	82–83	83–84	84–85	85–86	86–87	87–88	88–89	89–90	90–91	91–92	92–93	93–94	94–95	95–96	96–97	97–98	98–99	99–00
No. of teams	16	16	20	20	20	18	16	16	16	16	16	16	16	16	16	16	14	12
USM Alger	16	x	x	x	x	7	13	16	x	x	x	x	x	1	3	2	4	12
ES Sétif	2	6	6	2	1	14	x	5	7	9	12	15	x	x	x	4	5	5

	00–01	01–02	02–03	03–04	04–05	05–06	06–07	07–08	08–09	09–10	10–11	11–12	12–13	13–14	14–15	15–16	16–17	17–18
No. of teams	16	16	16	16	16	16	16	16	17	18	16	16	16	16	16	16	16	16
USM Alger	2	1	1	2	1	2	4	4	6	4	9	3	4	1	8	1	3	6
ES Sétif	7	8	7	4	11	4	1	3	1	2	3	1	1	3	1	5	1	8

	18–19	19–20	20–21	21–22	22–23	23–24	24–25	25–26
No. of teams	16	16	20	18	16	16	16	16
USM Alger	1	6	4	4	11	4	7	10
ES Sétif	5	3	2	7	6	5	6	11
