= 2026–27 Algerian Ligue Professionnelle 1 =

Algerian Ligue Professionnelle 1
- Season: 2026–27
- Dates: 3 September 2026 – 29 May 2027
- Matches: 75
- Goals: 146 (1.95 per match)
- Top goalscorer: Mohamed Ramdaoui; Dadi El Hocine Mouaki (5 goals)
- Biggest home win: JS El Biar 4–0 JS Saoura (18 September 2026); ES Sétif 5–1 CS Constantine (19 September 2026); CS Constantine 4–0 US Biskra (7 October 2026)
- Biggest away win: CS Constantine 2–4 JS El Biar (17 October 2026)
- Highest scoring: ASO Chlef 3–3 CR Belouizdad (5 September 2026); ES Sétif 5–1 CS Constantine (19 September 2026); CS Constantine 2–4 JS El Biar (17 October 2026)
- Longest winning run: CR Belouizdad (4 matches)
- Longest unbeaten run: CR Belouizdad (8 matches)
- Longest winless run: US Biskra (10 matches)
- Longest losing run: CS Constantine (5 matches)
- All statistics correct as of 20 November 2026.

The 2026–27 Algerian Ligue Professionnelle 1 is the 65th season of the Algerian Ligue Professionnelle 1 since its establishment in 1962. A total of 16 teams contest the league. It began on 3 September 2026 and will conclude on 29 May 2027. The league fixtures were announced on 3 August 2026.

== Teams ==
16 teams contest the league. JS El Biar, US Biskra and CR Témouchent were promoted from the 2025–26 Algerian League 2.

=== Changes ===
▲ from 2025–26 Algerian League 2	▼ to 2026–27 Algerian League 2
JS El Biar; US Biskra; CR Témouchent	Paradou AC; ES Mostaganem; MC El Bayadh

=== Stadiums and locations ===
Location of teams in 2026–27 Ligue Professionnelle 1
Algiers Province clubs

Club	Location	Venue	Capacity
ASO Chlef	Chlef	Mohamed Boumezrag Stadium	18,000
CR Belouizdad	Algiers	Nelson Mandela Stadium	40,000
CR Témouchent	Aïn Témouchent	Omar Oucief Stadium	11,500
CS Constantine	Constantine	Chahid Hamlaoui Stadium	22,968
ES Ben Aknoun	Algiers	20 August 1955 Stadium	10,000
ES Sétif	Sétif	8 May 1945 Stadium	25,000
JS El Biar	El Biar	Omar Benrabah Stadium	8,000
JS Kabylie	Tizi Ouzou	Hocine Aït Ahmed Stadium	50,766
JS Saoura	Béchar	20 August 1955 Stadium	20,000
MB Rouissat	Rouissat	18 February Stadium	18,000
MC Alger	Algiers	Ali La Pointe Stadium	40,000
MC Oran	Oran	Miloud Hadefi Stadium	40,143
Olympique Akbou	Akbou	Martyrs Stadium	11,500
US Biskra	Biskra	Bouhafs Chabi Stadium (Note: US Biskra played home games at Bouhafs Chabi Stadium due to renovation in 18 February Stadium.)	5,400
USM Alger	Algiers	Stade du 5 Juillet	64,000
USM Khenchela	Khenchela	Amar Hamam Stadium	8,000

=== Personnel and kits ===
Team	Manager	Captain	Kit manufacturer
ASO Chlef	(Algeria) Mounir Zeghdoud	(Algeria) Abdelhak Debbari	Puma
CR Belouizdad	(Tunisia) Nabil Maâloul	(Algeria) Sofiane Bouchar	Puma
CR Témouchent	(Algeria) Moustapha Djallit	(Algeria) Islam Chahrour	Macron
CS Constantine	(Algeria) Amara Merouani	(Algeria) Brahim Dib	Macron
ES Ben Aknoun	(Algeria) Lotfi Boudraa	(Algeria) Abderahmane Hachoud	Bepro
ES Sétif	(Tunisia) Lassaad Chabbi	(Algeria) Larbi Tabti	Macron
JS El Biar	(Algeria) Mohamed Turqui	(Algeria) Fayçal Abdat	Macron
JS Kabylie	(Algeria) Karim Belhocine	(Algeria) Aymen Mahious	Kappa
JS Saoura	(Algeria) Majdi Kardi	(Algeria) Fayçal Mebarki	Umbro
MB Rouissat	(Algeria) Abdelhaq Belaid	(Algeria) Messaoud Midoune	Macron
MC Alger	(Tunisia) Khaled Ben Yahia	(Algeria) Ayoub Abdellaoui	Peak
MC Oran	(Algeria) Tahar Chérif El-Ouazzani	(Algeria) Mokhtar Belkhiter	Macron
Olympique Akbou	(Algeria) Abdelkader Amrani	(Algeria) Walid Bencherifa	Macron
US Biskra		(Algeria) Oussama Darfalou	Hummel
USM Alger	(Senegal) Lamine N'Diaye	(Algeria) Saâdi Radouani	Macron
USM Khenchela	(Algeria) Mohamed Djebaili	(Algeria) Oussama Litim	Kappa

=== Managerial changes ===
Team	Outgoing manager	Manner of departure	Date of vacancy	Position in table	Incoming manager	Date of appointment
Olympique Akbou	(Algeria) Amar Guerbi	End of contract	6 June 2026	Pre-season	(Algeria) Abdelkader Amrani	13 June 2026
ES Sétif	(Algeria) Lotfi Amrouche	End of contract	6 June 2026	Pre-season	(Egypt) Hamada Sedki	1 July 2026
CS Constantine	(Algeria) Khaled Guerioune	End of contract	6 June 2026	Pre-season	(Tunisia) Mondher Kebaier	2 July 2026
CR Belouizdad	(Algeria) Ishak Ali Moussa	End of contract	6 June 2026	Pre-season	(Tunisia) Nabil Maâloul	2 July 2026
JS Kabylie	(Algeria) Rabah Bensafi	End of contract	6 June 2026	Pre-season	(Algeria) Karim Belhocine	4 July 2026
MB Rouissat	(Tunisia) Lassaad Maamar	End of contract	6 June 2026	Pre-season	(Algeria) Djilali Bahloul	9 July 2026
JS Saoura	(Algeria) Abdelkader Amrani	End of contract	6 June 2026	Pre-season	(Algeria) Lotfi Boudraa	19 July 2026
US Biskra	(Algeria) Samir Zaoui	End of contract	6 June 2026	Pre-season	(Algeria) Nadhir Leknaoui	26 July 2026
USM Khenchela	(Algeria) Billel Dziri	Resigned	19 September 2026	13th	(Algeria) Mohamed Djebaili (c)	19 September 2026
JS Saoura	(Algeria) Lotfi Boudraa	Mutual consent	19 September 2026	16th	(Algeria) Majdi Kardi	4 October 2026
CS Constantine	(Tunisia) Mondher Kebaier	Sacked	18 October 2026	9th	(Algeria) Amara Merouani	6 November 2026
US Biskra	(Algeria) Nadhir Leknaoui	Sacked	21 October 2026	16th	(Tunisia) Yamen Zelfani	26 October 2026
ASO Chlef	(Algeria) Abdelhaq Belaid	Resigned	24 October 2026	14th	(Algeria) Mounir Zeghdoud	17 November 2026
ES Sétif	(Egypt) Hamada Sedki	Mutual consent	26 October 2026	12th	(Tunisia) Lassaad Chabbi	17 November 2026
MB Rouissat	(Algeria) Djilali Bahloul	Resigned	6 November 2026	4th	(Algeria) Abdelhaq Belaid	14 November 2026
ES Ben Aknoun	(Algeria) Mounir Zeghdoud	Resigned	9 November 2026	11th	(Algeria) Lotfi Boudraa	16 November 2026
US Biskra	(Tunisia) Yamen Zelfani	Resigned	18 November 2026	16th		

=== Foreign players ===
Club	Player 1	Player 2	Player 3	Player 4	Players left during the season
ASO Chlef	(Liberia) Edward Ledlum	(Togo) Kokou Avotor	(Niger) Ismael Moussa	(Ivory Coast) Ousmane Diakité	
CR Belouizdad	(Tunisia) Mohamed Ali Ben Hammouda	(Tunisia) Houssem Tka	(Cameroon) Franck Etouga	(Republic of the Congo) Julio Bandessi	
CR Témouchent	(Egypt) Mohamed Zaalouk	(Egypt) Seif Safaga			
CS Constantine	(Togo) Yawo Agbagno	(Rwanda) Djihad Bizimana	(Democratic Republic of the Congo) Johnson Atibu	(Uganda) Rogers Torach	
ES Ben Aknoun	(Ivory Coast) Mohamed Sylla				
ES Sétif	(Ghana) Salifu Mudasiru	(Gabon) Mick Omfia	(Jordan) Hadi Al-Hourani	(Jordan) Yousef Abu Jalboush	
JS El Biar	(Guinea) Alhassane Bangoura	(Guinea) Bangaly Cissé	(Senegal) Ibrahima Cissoko	(Senegal) Alassane Kanté	
JS Kabylie	(Ivory Coast) Josaphat Arthur Bada	(Mauritania) Nouh Mohamed El Abd	(Tanzania) Alphonce Msanga	(Mauritania) Aly Abeid	
JS Saoura	(Ivory Coast) Constant Wayou	(Ivory Coast) Anthony Tra Bi Tra	(Ivory Coast) Ashiraf Ojo		
MB Rouissat	(Ghana) Hamidu Fatawu	(Republic of the Congo) Djigo Saïkou	(Mauritania) Mamadou Sy	(Cameroon) Mohamed Moluh Mounta	
MC Alger	(Burkina Faso) Mohamed Zougrana	(Guinea) Mohamed Saliou Bangoura	(Burundi) Mossi Nduwumwe	(Jordan) Ali Azaizeh	
MC Oran	(Guinea) Ousmane Coumbassa	(Mali) Boubacar Traoré	(Gabon) Edlin Essang-Matouti	(Gabon) Oumar Bagnama	
Olympique Akbou	(Mauritania) Khadim Diaw	(Senegal) Moussa Sogué	(Senegal) Bonaventure Fonseca	(Niger) Ibrahim Harouna	
US Biskra	(Ivory Coast) Ezechiel Zaddy	(Comoros) Yassine Saindou	(Democratic Republic of the Congo) Aristote Zeke Omwele		
USM Alger	(Democratic Republic of the Congo) Glody Likonza	(Cameroon) Che Malone	(Senegal) Aimé Tendeng	(Ivory Coast) Dramane Kamagaté	
USM Khenchela	(Guinea) Alhassane Camara	(Ivory Coast) Issouf Kamara	(Nigeria) Ayobami Junior	(Senegal) Almamy Fall	

== League table ==
Pos	Team	Pld	W	D	L	GF	GA	GD	Pts	Qualification or relegation
1	JS Kabylie	9	6	2	1	13	3	+10	20	Qualification for CAF Champions League
2	CR Belouizdad	9	6	2	1	13	8	+5	20	Qualification for CAF Champions League
3	MC Oran	9	5	3	1	8	3	+5	18	Qualification for CAF Confederation Cup
4	MB Rouissat	10	5	3	2	10	6	+4	18	
5	MC Alger	8	5	1	2	9	3	+6	16	
6	Olympique Akbou	9	4	3	2	10	6	+4	15	
7	USM Alger	8	4	2	2	10	7	+3	14	
8	JS El Biar	10	3	3	4	13	12	+1	12	
9	CR Témouchent	10	2	5	3	7	10	−3	11	
10	ES Sétif	9	2	4	3	11	9	+2	10	
11	CS Constantine	10	3	1	6	12	18	−6	10	
12	ES Ben Aknoun	9	1	5	3	8	10	−2	8	
13	ASO Chlef	10	1	5	4	9	13	−4	8	
14	USM Khenchela	10	1	4	5	5	12	−7	7	Relegation to Algerian League 2
15	JS Saoura	10	1	4	5	3	11	−8	7	Relegation to Algerian League 2
16	US Biskra	10	0	5	5	5	15	−10	5	Relegation to Algerian League 2

Updated to match(es) played on 20 November 2026. Source: lfp.dz
Rules for classification: 1) Points; 2) Head-to-head points; 3) Head-to-head goal difference; 4) First half goal difference; 5) First half total goals; 6) Fairplay ranking; 7) Playoff.

== Results ==
Home \ Away	ASO	CRB	CRT	CSC	ESBA	ESS	JSEB	JSK	JSS	MBR	MCA	MCO	OA	USB	USMA	USMK
ASO Chlef		3–3				1–2				1–1	1–1	0–1				2–0
CR Belouizdad						1–0			1–0			a			a	1–0
CR Témouchent	1–1			1–1			0–0	1–0		0–2				1–1		
CS Constantine	3–0				1–0		2–4							4–0	0–2	
ES Ben Aknoun		0–1					2–2							2–2		
ES Sétif			1–2	5–1	0–1			1–1		1–1				1–1	a	
JS El Biar		2–3							4–0		1–0	0–0	0–2			
JS Kabylie	1–0						1–0			1–0	a			4–1	2–0	
JS Saoura				1–0	0–0	0–0										1–1
MB Rouissat		1–0			1–1				1–0				2–0		1–0	
MC Alger			1–0					a		2–0		2–0	0–1		a	2–0
MC Oran		a	2–0			0–0			3–1				0–0		a	1–0
Olympique Akbou				3–0	2–1			0–0							2–3	
US Biskra	0–0	0–1							0–0		0–1	0–1				
USM Alger		2–2				a	2–0	a	1–0		a	a				
USM Khenchela			1–1	2–0	1–1			0–3							0–0	

Updated to match(es) played on 20 November 2026. Source: lfp.dz
Legend: Blue = home team win; Yellow = draw; Red = away team win.

== Clubs season-progress ==
Team ╲ Round	1	2	3	4	5	6	7	8	9	10	11	12	13	14	15	16	17	18	19	20	21	22	23	24	25	26	27	28	29	30
ASO Chlef	D	L	L	L	D	D	D	L	D	W																				
CR Belouizdad	D	W	W	W	W		D	W	W	L																				
CR Témouchent	D	L	W	L	L	D	W	D	D	D																				
CS Constantine	D	W	L	W	L	L	L	L	L	W																				
ES Ben Aknoun	W	D	D	D	L		D	D	L	L																				
ES Sétif	L	L	W	D	D		L	W	D	D																				
JS El Biar	L	L	W	D	L	W	D	L	W	D																				
JS Kabylie	W		L	W	D	W	W	W	D	W																				
JS Saoura	D	D	L	D	L	L	D	L	W	L																				
MB Rouissat	L	W	L	W	W	W	D	D	D	W																				
MC Alger	W		W	W	D		L	W	L	L																				
MC Oran	L	W	W	D	W	W	D	D		W																				
Olympique Akbou	W	L	L	D	W		W	D	D	W																				
US Biskra	D	D	L	L	L	L	L	D	D	D																				
USM Alger	D	W	W	L	W		D	W		L																				
USM Khenchela	D	D	D	L	W	L	L	L	D	L																				

Updated to match(es) played on 20 November 2026. Source: lfp.dz
W = Win; D = Draw; L = Lose

== Positions by round ==
Team ╲ Round	1	2	3	4	5	6	7	8	9	10	11	12	13	14	15	16	17	18	19	20	21	22	23	24	25	26	27	28	29	30
ASO Chlef	5																													
CR Belouizdad	6																													
CR Témouchent	7																													
CS Constantine	8																													
ES Ben Aknoun	3																													
ES Sétif	13																													
JS El Biar	15																													
JS Kabylie	4																													
JS Saoura	9																													
MB Rouissat	14																													
MC Alger	1																													
MC Oran	16																													
Olympique Akbou	2																													
US Biskra	10																													
USM Alger	11																													
USM Khenchela	12																													

Leader
2027–28 CAF Champions League
2027–28 CAF Confederation Cup
Relegation to Algerian League 2

Updated to match(es) played on 20 November 2026. Source: lfp.dz

== Season statistics ==
=== Top scorers ===
Rank	Goalscorer	Club	Goals
1	(Algeria) Mohamed Ramdaoui	USM Alger	5
1	(Algeria) Dadi El Hocine Mouaki	JS El Biar	5
3	(Algeria) Riad Benayad	ES Sétif	4
3	(Tunisia) Mohamed Ali Ben Hammouda	CR Belouizdad	4
3	(Algeria) Fodil Belkhadem	US Biskra	4

Updated to games played on 20 November 2026.
Source: lfp.dz

=== Hat-tricks ===
Player	For	Against	Result	Date	Ref
(Algeria) Dadi El Hocine Mouaki	JS El Biar	CS Constantine*	2–4	17 October 2026	

== Awards ==
=== Monthly awards ===
Month	Player of the Month		References
Month	Player	Club	References
September	(Jordan) Hadi Al-Hourani	ES Sétif	
October	(Algeria) Billel Messaoudi	JS Kabylie	

== See also ==
- 2026–27 Algerian League 2
- 2026–27 Algerian Cup
- 2026 Algerian Super Cup
