= Hadi Al-Hourani =

Jordanian footballer (born 2000)

Personal information
- Birth name: Hadi Omar Ahmed Al-Hourani
- Date of birth: 14 March 2000 (age 26)
- Place of birth: Jordan
- Height: 1.86 m (6 ft 1 in)
- Position: Defender

Team information
- Current team: ES Sétif
- Number: 4

Youth career
- –2019: Al-Ramtha

Senior career*
Years	Team	Apps	(Gls)
2020–2023	Al-Ramtha		
2023–2024	FUS Rabat	7	(0)
2024–2026	Al-Faisaly	29	(5)
2026–	ES Sétif	1	(0)

International career^{‡}
2020–2022	Jordan U23	10	(0)
2021–	Jordan	6	(0)
Medal record
Representing Jordan
Men's football
FIFA Arab Cup
Runner-up	2025 Qatar	Team
- * Club domestic league appearances and goals as of 3 September 2026 ‡ National team caps and goals as of 15 December 2025

Hadi Omar Ahmed Al-Hourani (Arabic: هَادِي عُمَر أَحْمَد الْحَوْرَانِيّ; born 14 March 2000) is a Jordanian professional footballer who plays as a defender for Algerian Ligue Professionnelle 1 side ES Sétif and the Jordan national team.

== Club career ==
=== Al-Ramtha ===
Al-Hourani began his senior career with Jordanian club Al-Ramtha during the 2020 Jordanian Pro League season. He was crowned West Asia's player on the month by the AFC for the month of November 2020.

On 7 July 2021, Al-Hourani got involved in a fistfight during a match against Al-Wehdat, where he was ejected from the match as a result.

On 14 July 2023, FUS Rabat made an offer to purchase Al-Hourani from Al-Ramtha with Al-Ramtha receiving $100 thousand in three installments and receiving 15% of his value for any future sale. Al-Hourani did not require his club's approval, as his contract with the club was reaching to an end. However, he was able to benefit the financially-struggling club through that transfer.

He finished with the club with a league trophy in 2021, as well as a Jordan Super Cup win in 2022.

=== FUS Rabat ===
Al-Hourani completed his transfer to FUS Rabat on 20 August 2023, with a contract worth $400 thousand. It was noted that he struggled to immediately make an impact with the team, as he had joined the club during the middle of the season and required time to adapt to the atmosphere. By May 2024, Al-Hourani faced a dilemma at the club, where a managerial change had caused him and other foreign internationals at the club to get neglected for local Moroccan players. Requesting to leave, the club did not oblige when a loan offer to Norway fell through.

=== Al-Faisaly ===
On 11 September 2024, Al-Hourani returned to Jordan and signed with Al-Faisaly. He had signed a 4-month contract, as he had agreed to move to a Norwegian club in early 2025. By 25 September 2024, however, Al-Faisaly were reported to have requested FIFA for an international transfer card to Al-Hourani from FUS Rabat, as he has not yet participated for the club in any competitions. On 11 November 2024, as a result of the delay, Al-Hourani begun the process of suing his former club, as to demand the late financial dues since his departure from the team.

=== ES Sétif ===
On 20 July 2026, he joined Algerian club ES Sétif, to be the first Jordanian player ever to join an Algerian club.

== International career ==
Al-Hourani was first called up to a Jordan national team camp in August 2019, to replace the injured Ihsan Haddad.

He also played for the Jordan national under-23 football team, where he captained the team and was able to win the 2021 WAFF U-23 Championship.

He was called up to the senior national team to participate in the 2021 FIFA Arab Cup.
