= 2026–27 Algerian Cup =

Tournament details
- Country: Algeria
- Dates: 4 December 2026 – 1 May 2027
- Teams: 64 (as of first national round)
- All statistics correct as of 5 June 2026.

The 2026–27 Algerian Cup (Arabic: كأس الجزائر 27-2026) will be the 60th edition of the Algerian Cup. It is sponsored by Mobilis and known as the Mobilis Algerian Cup for sponsorship purposes. The winners will qualify to the 2027–28 CAF Confederation Cup. It will begin on 4 December 2026 and will conclude on 1 May 2027.USM Alger are the defending champions.

== Teams ==
| Round | Clubs remaining | Clubs involved | Winners from previous round | New entries this round | Leagues entering at this round |
Regional rounds
| First round | - | - | - | - | Ligue de Football de la Wilaya; Ligue Régional II; Ligue Régional I |
| Second round | - | - | - | - | Interregional League |
| Third round | - | - | - | - | none |
| Fourth round | - | - | - | - | Algerian League 2 |
| Fifth round | - | - | - | - | none |
National rounds
| Round of 64 | 64 | 64 | 48 | 16 | Algerian Ligue Professionnelle 1 |
| Round of 32 | 32 | 32 | 32 | none | none |
| Round of 16 | 16 | 16 | 16 | none | none |
| Quarter-finals | 8 | 8 | 8 | none | none |
| Semi-finals | 4 | 4 | 4 | none | none |
| Final | 2 | 2 | 2 | none | none |

== Round of 64 ==
| December 2026 1 | () | – | () |
| : |

| December 2026 2 | () | – | () |
| : |

| December 2026 3 | () | – | () |
| : |

| December 2026 4 | () | – | () |
| : |

| December 2026 5 | () | – | () |
| : |

| December 2026 6 | () | – | () |
| : |

| December 2026 7 | () | – | () |
| : |

| December 2026 8 | () | – | () |
| : |

| December 2026 9 | () | – | () |
| : |

| December 2026 10 | () | – | () |
| : |

| December 2026 11 | () | – | () |
| : |

| December 2026 12 | () | – | () |
| : |

| December 2026 13 | () | – | () |
| : |

| December 2026 14 | () | – | () |
| : |

| December 2026 15 | () | – | () |
| : |

| December 2026 16 | () | – | () |
| : |

| December 2026 17 | () | – | () |
| : |

| December 2026 18 | () | – | () |
| : |

| December 2026 19 | () | – | () |
| : |

| December 2026 20 | () | – | () |
| : |

| December 2026 21 | () | – | () |
| : |

| December 2026 22 | () | – | () |
| : |

| December 2026 23 | () | – | () |
| : |

| December 2026 24 | () | – | () |
| : |

| December 2026 25 | () | – | () |
| : |

| December 2026 26 | () | – | () |
| : |

| December 2026 27 | () | – | () |
| : |

| December 2026 28 | () | – | () |
| : |

| December 2026 29 | () | – | () |
| : |

| December 2026 30 | () | – | () |
| : |

| December 2026 31 | () | – | () |
| : |

| December 2026 32 | () | – | () |
| : |

== Round of 32 ==
| December 2026 33 | Winners 1 () | – | Winners 2 () |
| : |

| December 2026 34 | Winners 3 () | – | Winners 4 () |
| : |

| December 2026 35 | Winners 5 () | – | Winners 6 () |
| : |

| December 2026 36 | Winners 7 () | – | Winners 8 () |
| : |

| December 2026 37 | Winners 9 () | – | Winners 10 () |
| : |

| December 2026 38 | Winners 11 () | – | Winners 12 () |
| : |

| December 2026 39 | Winners 13 () | – | Winners 14 () |
| : |

| December 2026 40 | Winners 15 () | – | Winners 16 () |
| : |

| December 2026 41 | Winners 17 () | – | Winners 18 () |
| : |

| December 2026 42 | Winners 19 () | – | Winners 20 () |
| : |

| December 2026 43 | Winners 21 () | – | Winners 22 () |
| : |

| December 2026 44 | Winners 23 () | – | Winners 24 () |
| : |

| December 2026 45 | Winners 25 () | – | Winners 26 () |
| : |

| December 2026 46 | Winners 27 () | – | Winners 28 () |
| : |

| December 2026 47 | Winners 29 () | – | Winners 30 () |
| : |

| December 2026 48 | Winners 31 () | – | Winners 32 () |
| : |

== Round of 16 ==
| January 2027 49 | Winners 33 () | – | Winners 34 () |
| : |

| January 2027 50 | Winners 35 () | – | Winners 36 () |
| : |

| January 2027 51 | Winners 37 () | – | Winners 38 () |
| : |

| January 2027 52 | Winners 39 () | – | Winners 40 () |
| : |

| January 2027 53 | Winners 41 () | – | Winners 42 () |
| : |

| January 2027 54 | Winners 43 () | – | Winners 44 () |
| : |

| January 2027 55 | Winners 45 () | – | Winners 46 () |
| : |

| January 2027 56 | Winners 47 () | – | Winners 48 () |
| : |

== Quarter-finals ==
| February 2027 57 | Winners 49 () | – | Winners 50 () |
| : |

| February 2027 58 | Winners 51 () | – | Winners 52 () |
| : |

| February 2027 59 | Winners 53 () | – | Winners 54 () |
| : |

| February 2027 60 | Winners 55 () | – | Winners 56 () |
| : |

== Semi-finals ==
| April 2027 61 | Winners 57 () | – | Winners 58 () |
| : |

| April 2027 62 | Winners 59 () | – | Winners 60 () |
| : |

== Final ==
| 1 May 2027 Final | Winners 61 () | – | Winners 62 () |
| : |

== See also ==
- 2026–27 Algerian Ligue Professionnelle 1
- 2026–27 Algerian League 2
