= Martyrs Stadium (Akbou) =

Football stadium in Khenchela, Algeria

- Interactive map of Martyrs Stadium
- Location: Akbou, Algeria
- Coordinates: 36.45172°N 4.54126°E
- Owner: APC of Akbou
- Capacity: 11,500
- Surface: Artificial turf

Construction
- Built: 2023
- Opened: 2026

Tenant
- Olympique Akbou

Martyrs Stadium (Arabic: ملعب الشهداء) is a football stadium in Akbou, Algeria. The stadium holds 11,500 people. It serves as the home ground for Olympique Akbou which plays in Algerian Ligue Professionnelle 1.

The stadium was scheduled to open in 2025, but it was postponed to 2026 because the works were not completed.

On 26 August 2026, the stadium was officially approved by LFP Stadiums Committee to host matches.

On 13 September 2026, the stadium was officially inaugurated by the authorities of Akbou.
