= 2024–25 ASO Chlef season =

ASO Chlef
2024–25 season
- President: Abdelkrim Medouar (from 15 July 2024)
- Head coach: Samir Zaoui (from 15 July 2024)
- Stadium: Mohamed Boumezrag Stadium
- Ligue 1: 13th
- Algerian Cup: Round of 64
- Top goalscorer: League: Yawo Agbagno (10 goals); All: Yawo Agbagno (10 goals)
Home colours	Away colours	Third colours

The 2024–25 season, is ASO Chlef's 34th season and the club's 6th consecutive season in the top flight of Algerian football. In addition to the domestic league, ASO Chlef are participating in the Algerian Cup. On June 27, 2024, The federal office approved the calendar for the 2024–25 Ligue 1 season with the aim of ending on May 31, 2025. The first round is scheduled for September 14, this delay is motivated both by an extended end of the 2023–24 season but also by the holding of early presidential elections which will take place on September 7, 2024. However, the Ligue de Football Professionnel decided to postpone the start of the Ligue 1 by a week, on September 21.

On July 15, 2024, in a press release published on ASO Chlef Facebook page, a meeting of the SSPA Board of Directors was announced, during which important decisions were made. The members of the Constituent Assembly appointed Abdelkrim Medouar as president instead of Abdelkrim Ouahab. Medouar's first decision was to appoint Samir Zaoui as head coach. With a staff consisting of Aziz Khellafi assistant coach, Abdelaali Sahri physical trainer and Hocine Abrous goalkeeper coach.

== Squad list ==
Players and squad numbers last updated on 5 February 2025.
Note: Flags indicate national team as has been defined under FIFA eligibility rules. Players may hold more than one non-FIFA nationality.

No.	Nat.	Position	Name	Date of birth (age)	Signed from
Goalkeepers
1	(Algeria)	Sofiane Kacem	GK	11 January 1993 (aged 31)	(Algeria) JSM Skikda
16	(Algeria)	Abderrahmane Medjadel	GK	1 July 1998 (aged 26)	(Algeria) MSP Batna
30	(Algeria)	Mohamed Medjadji	GK	30 March 2002 (aged 22)	(Algeria) Reserve team
Defenders
3	(Algeria)	Mohamed El Amine Barka	CB	20 March 1993 (aged 31)	(Algeria) MC El Bayadh
5	(Algeria)	Tarek Bouabta	CB	21 July 1991 (aged 33)	(Bahrain) Al-Khaldiya SC
13	(Algeria)	Abderrahim Hamra	CB	21 July 1997 (aged 27)	(Algeria) USM Alger
14	(Algeria)	Ayoub Sadahine	RB	16 June 2001 (aged 23)	(Algeria) SKAF Khemis Miliana
20	(Algeria)	Belkacem Brahimi	LB	20 January 1994 (aged 30)	(Algeria) ES Sétif
22	(Algeria)	Mokhtar Belkhiter	RB	15 January 1992 (aged 31)	(Tunisia) Club Africain
23	(Algeria)	Achref Abada	CB	15 June 1999 (aged 25)	(Algeria) MC El Eulma
26	(Algeria)	Abdelhak Debbari	RB	6 January 1993 (aged 31)	(Algeria) HB Chelghoum Laïd
28	(Algeria)	Abdelillah Badani	CB	5 October 2004 (aged 19)	(Algeria) Reserve team
29	(Algeria)	Houssam Kellouche	LB	12 August 2003 (aged 21)	(Algeria) Reserve team
Midfielders
6	(Botswana)	Gape Mohutsiwa	DM	20 March 1997 (aged 27)	(Botswana) Jwaneng Galaxy
8	(Algeria)	Abdelkader Boussaid	DM	19 March 1992 (aged 32)	(Algeria) JSM Skikda
10	(Algeria)	Imadeddine Larbi	AM	31 July 2002 (aged 22)	(Algeria) GC Mascara
12	(Niger)	Ismael Moussa	DM	1 January 2002 (aged 22)	(Spain) Granada CF
15	(Algeria)	Redouane Bounoua	AM	1 November 1998 (aged 25)	(Algeria) WA Tlemcen
18	(Algeria)	Mohamed Ilyas Abboub	DM	27 May 2003 (aged 21)	(Algeria) Reserve team
21	(Algeria)	Ibrahim Farhi Benhalima	CM	16 April 1997 (aged 27)	(Algeria) JS Saoura
Forwards
2	(Algeria)	Anis Elhadj Benchouya	ST	6 September 2002 (aged 22)	(Algeria) Reserve team
7	(Togo)	Yawo Agbagno	ST	25 May 2000 (aged 24)	(Togo) AS OTR Lomé
11	(Algeria)	Zineddine Boutmène	RW	October 21, 2000 (aged 23)	(Algeria) CR Belouizdad
17	(Algeria)	Moussa Boukhenna	RW	25 March 1997 (aged 27)	(Algeria) ES Mostaganem
24	(Liberia)	Edward Ledlum	LW	15 June 1999 (aged 25)	(Liberia) Paynesville FC
25	(Togo)	Kokou Avotor	ST	17 November 2000 (aged 23)	(Togo) AS OTR Lomé
27	(Algeria)	Mustapha Alili	LW	30 November 1996 (aged 27)	(Algeria) JS Kabylie

== Transfers ==
=== In ===
==== Summer ====
Date	Pos	Player	Moving from	Fee	Source
17 July 2024	GK	(Algeria) Abderrahmane Medjadel	MSP Batna	Free transfer	
17 July 2024	AM	(Algeria) Imadeddine Larbi	GC Mascara	Free transfer	
18 July 2024	AM	(Algeria) Belkacem Bourorga	SKAF Khemis Miliana	Free transfer	
31 July 2024	RW	(Algeria) Moussa Boukhena	ES Mostaganem	Free transfer	
6 August 2024	CB	(Algeria) Mohamed El Amine Barka	MC El Bayadh	Free transfer	
6 August 2024	RB	(Algeria) Ayoub Sadahine	SKAF Khemis Miliana	Free transfer	
18 August 2024	LB	(Algeria) Belkacem Brahimi	ES Sétif	Free transfer	
27 August 2024	DM	(Niger) Ismael Moussa	(Spain) Granada CF C	Free transfer	
9 September 2024	RB	(Algeria) Mokhtar Belkhiter	CR Belouizdad	Free transfer	
9 September 2024	CB	(Algeria) Tarek Bouabta	(Bahrain) Al-Khaldiya	Free transfer	

==== Winter ====
Date	Pos	Player	Moving to	Fee	Source
13 January 2025	LW	(Liberia) Edward Ledlum	(Liberia) Paynesville FC	Free transfer	
28 January 2025	RW	(Algeria) Zineddine Boutmène	Unattached	Free transfer	
3 February 2025	ST	(Togo) Kokou Avotor	(Togo) AS OTR Lomé	Free transfer	

=== Out ===
==== Summer ====
Date	Pos	Player	Moving to	Fee	Source
4 July 2024	MF	(Algeria) Juba Aguieb	MC Oran	Free transfer	
14 July 2024	FW	(Algeria) Yacine Aliane	MC Oran	Free transfer	
17 July 2024	CM	(Algeria) Toufik Addadi	ES Mostaganem	Free transfer	
17 July 2024	GK	(Algeria) Mohamed Alaouchiche	ES Mostaganem	Free transfer	

==== Winter ====
Date	Pos	Player	Moving to	Fee	Source
22 January 2025	AM	(Algeria) Abderrahmane Bourdim	MC Oran	Undisclosed	

== Competitions ==
=== Overview ===
Competition	Record								Started round	Final position / round	First match	Last match
Competition	G	W	D	L	GF	GA	GD	Win %	Started round	Final position / round	First match	Last match
Ligue 1	30	7	13	10	24	27	−3	23.33	—N/a	13th	21 September 2024	20 June 2025
Algerian Cup	1	0	0	1	1	2	−1	0.00	Round of 64		3 January 2025	
Total	31	7	13	11	25	29	−4	22.58				

Updated to match played 21 June 2025
Source: Competitions

=== Ligue 1 ===
==== League table ====
Pos	Team	Pld	W	D	L	GF	GA	GD	Pts	Qualification or relegation
11	Olympique Akbou	30	9	10	11	24	23	+1	37	
12	MC El Bayadh	30	9	9	12	23	26	−3	36	
13	ASO Chlef	30	7	13	10	24	27	−3	34	
14	ES Mostaganem	30	8	10	12	23	31	−8	34	
15	NC Magra (R)	30	7	10	13	23	35	−12	31	Relegation to Algerian Ligue 2

Source: the-sports.org
Rules for classification: 1) points; 2) head-to-head points; 3) head-to-head goal difference; 4) goal difference; 5) total goals; 6) fairplay ranking; 7) playoff.
(R) Relegated

==== Results summary ====
Overall								Home						Away					
Pld	W	D	L	GF	GA	GD	Pts	W	D	L	GF	GA	GD	W	D	L	GF	GA	GD
30	7	13	10	24	27	−3	34	5	8	2	14	8	+6	2	5	8	10	19	−9

Last updated: 21 June 2025.
Source: Competitive matches

==== Results by round ====
Round	1	2	3	4	5	6	7	8	9	10	11	12	13	14	15	16	17	18	19	20	21	22	23	24	25	26	27	28	29	30
Ground	A	H	A	H	A	H	A	H	A	H	A	H	A	A	H	H	A	H	A	H	A	H	A	H	A	H	A	H	H	A
Result	L	D	D	D	D	D	L	W	W	D	L	W	D	D	W	W	D	W	L	D	W	L	L	D	L	D	L	L	D	L
Position	16	15	14	16	12	14	16	14	10	11	12	11	10	10	8	7	6	5	6	6	5	5	7	8	9	10	11	13	13	13

Updated to match(es) played on 21 June 2025. Source: Competitive matches
A = Away; H = Home; W = Win; D = Draw; L = Loss

==== Matches ====
The league fixtures were announced on 11 July 2024.

All times are local, WAT (UTC+1).

Win Draw Loss Postponed

21 September 2024 Round 1	Paradou AC	2–0	ASO Chlef	Algiers
16:00	Boulbina 25', 61' (pen.)	Report		Stadium: 20 August 1955 Stadium; Referee: Youcef Gamouh

27 September 2024 Round 2	ASO Chlef	0–0	CS Constantine	Chlef
18:00		Report		Stadium: Mohamed Boumezrag Stadium; Referee: Youcef Taieb Bouderbal

4 October 2024 Round 3	MC Oran	0–0	ASO Chlef	Bir El Djir
20:30		Report		Stadium: Miloud Hadefi Stadium; Referee: Mehdi Oukil; VAR: Alaa Bouab

18 October 2024 Round 5	Olympique Akbou	0–0	ASO Chlef	Béjaïa
16:00		Report		Stadium: Maghrebi Unity Stadium; Referee: Tahar Boudjemaa; VAR: Anes Azrine

22 October 2024 (Note: The match between ASO Chlef and USM Khenchela is postponed from October 12, to October 22, 2024, due to the presence of three players from ASO Chlef with their national teams, Mohutsiwa with Botswana, Mahamadou Moussa with Niger and Agbagno with Togo.) Round 4	ASO Chlef	1–1	USM Khenchela	Chlef
16:00	Bourdim 31' (pen.)		Bakir 53'	Stadium: Mohamed Boumezrag Stadium; Referee: Bilel Soltani; VAR: Mustapha Ghorbal

26 October 2024 Round 6	ASO Chlef	0–0	USM Alger	Chlef
16:00		Report		Stadium: Mohamed Boumezrag Stadium; Referee: Alaa Bouab

2 November 2024 Round 7	ES Sétif	1–0	ASO Chlef	Sétif
17:45	Boubekeur 17'	Report		Stadium: 8 May 1945 Stadium; Referee: Mustapha Ghorbal

8 November 2024 Round 8	ASO Chlef	2–0	MC El Bayadh	Chlef
15:00	Agbagno 74' (pen.); Benchouya 81'	Report		Stadium: Mohamed Boumezrag Stadium; Attendance: 0 (close doors); Referee: Fateh Harkat

16 November 2024 Round 9	US Biskra	1–2	ASO Chlef	Biskra
16:00	Hamidi 20' (pen.)	Report	Benchouya 66'; Boukhenna 90+3'	Stadium: 18 February Stadium; Referee: Anes Azrine; VAR: Abderahmane Sahraoui

23 November 2024 Round 10	ASO Chlef	2–2	NC Magra	Chlef
15:00	Agbagno 16' (pen.), 90+2'	Report	Lakehal 3'; Bouzekri 54'	Stadium: Mohamed Boumezrag Stadium; Referee: Yahia Dehar

1 December 2024 Round 11	CR Belouizdad	2–0	ASO Chlef	Algiers
17:45	Mahious 45+6'; Mayo 53'	Report		Stadium: Stade du 5 Juillet; Attendance: 0 (close doors); Referee: Mehdi Oukil; VAR: Nabil Boukhalfa

7 December 2024 Round 12	ASO Chlef	2–0	ES Mostaganem	Chlef
15:00	Agbagno 45+3'; Sadahine 90+6'	Report		Stadium: Mohamed Boumezrag Stadium; Referee: Mustapha Ghorbal; VAR: Redouane Allou

13 December 2024 Round 13	JS Saoura	1–1	ASO Chlef	Béchar
16:00	Ghorab 35'	Report	Sadahine 90+7'	Stadium: 20 August 1955 Stadium; Referee: Lotfi Bekouassa

21 December 2024 Round 14	MC Alger	0–0	ASO Chlef	Algiers
16:30		Report		Stadium: Stade du 5 Juillet; Attendance: 0 (close doors); Referee: Akram Mechairia; VAR: Fateh Harkat

28 December 2024 Round 15	ASO Chlef	1–0	JS Kabylie	Chlef
15:00	Agbagno 90+5' (pen.)	Report		Stadium: Mohamed Boumezrag Stadium; Referee: Anes Azrine; VAR: Lahlou Benbraham

11 February 2025 Round 16	ASO Chlef	2–0	Paradou AC	Chlef
15:00	Ledlum 10'; Agbagno 16'	Report		Stadium: Mohamed Boumezrag Stadium; Attendance: 0 (close doors); Referee: Akram Mechairia; VAR: Redouane Allou

18 February 2025 Round 17	CS Constantine	2–2	ASO Chlef	Constantine
17:00	Belhocini 4' (pen.); Temine 19'	Report	Agbagno 12' (pen.); Avotor 90+1'	Stadium: Chahid Hamlaoui Stadium; Attendance: 0 (close doors); Referee: Tahar Boudjemaa; VAR: Lahlou Benbraham

25 February 2025 Round 18	ASO Chlef	1–0	MC Oran	Chlef
15:30	Agbagno 90+4' (pen.)	Report		Stadium: Mohamed Boumezrag Stadium; Referee: Yahia Dehar; VAR: Fateh Harkat

7 March 2025 Round 19	USM Khenchela	3–2	ASO Chlef	Khenchela
15:00	Ibara 17'; Guemroud 73'; Bakir 90+1'	Report	Sadahine 30'; Agbagno 66'	Stadium: Amar Hamam Stadium; Referee: Anes Azrine

15 March 2025 Round 20	ASO Chlef	0–0	Olympique Akbou	Chlef
15:00		Report		Stadium: Mohamed Boumezrag Stadium; Referee: Fateh Harkat

11 April 2025 Round 22	ASO Chlef	0–1	ES Sétif	Chlef
16:00		Report	Eduwo 6' (pen.)	Stadium: Mohamed Boumezrag Stadium; Referee: Nabil Boukhalfa; VAR: Rafik Aouina

19 April 2025 Round 23	MC El Bayadh	2–1	ASO Chlef	El Bayadh
16:00	Toual 3'; Chahrour 30'	Report	Brahimi 58'	Stadium: Zakaria Medjdoub Stadium; Referee: Tahar Boudjemaa

25 April 2025 Round 24	ASO Chlef	1–1	US Biskra	Chlef
16:00	Avotor 90+6'	Report	Saâd 57'	Stadium: Mohamed Boumezrag Stadium; Referee: Yahia Dehar; VAR: Redouane Allou

30 April 2025 Round 21	USM Alger	1–2	ASO Chlef	Algiers
18:00	Bimenyimana 90+1' (pen.)	Report	Ledlum 2'; Sadahine 66'	Stadium: Stade du 5 Juillet; Referee: Mehdi Oukil; VAR: Lotfi Bekouassa

10 May 2025 Round 25	NC Magra	2–0	ASO Chlef	Magra
16:00	Djabout 41'; Bouzekri 59'	Report		Stadium: Boucheligue Brothers Stadium; Referee: Youcef Gamouh

19 May 2025 Round 26	ASO Chlef	1–1	CR Belouizdad	Chlef
17:00	Bounoua 51'	Report	Meziane 3'	Stadium: Mohamed Boumezrag Stadium; Referee: Rafik Aouina; VAR: Redouane Allou

25 May 2025 Round 27	ES Mostaganem	1–0	ASO Chlef	Mostaganem
17:00	Aoudjane 42'	Report		Stadium: Mohamed Bensaïd Stadium; Referee: Lahlou Benbraham; VAR: Nabil Boukhalfa

11 June 2025 Round 28	ASO Chlef	1–2	JS Saoura	Chlef
17:00	Agbagno 73'	Report	Boutiche 5'; Fettouhi 90+1'	Stadium: Mohamed Boumezrag Stadium; Referee: Anes Azrine

17 June 2025 Round 29	ASO Chlef	0–0	MC Alger	Chlef
17:30		Report		Stadium: Mohamed Boumezrag Stadium; Referee: Nabil Boukhalfa; VAR: Youcef Taieb Bouderbal

21 June 2025 Round 30	JS Kabylie	1–0	ASO Chlef	Tizi Ouzou
17:45	Benchaa 17'	Report		Stadium: Hocine Aït Ahmed Stadium; Referee: Lahlou Benbraham; VAR: Ghada Mehat

=== Algerian Cup ===
3 January 2025 Round of 64	IRB El Kerma	2–1	ASO Chlef	Oran
14:30	Boubaker 31'; Balegh 85'	Report	Hamra 74' (pen.)	Stadium: Ahmed Zabana Stadium; Referee: Oussama Mekfoudji

== Squad information ==
=== Appearances and goals ===
As of 21 June 2024

No.	Pos	Player	Nat	Ligue 1			Algerian Cup			Total		
No.	Pos	Player	Nat	App	St	G	App	St	G	App	St	G
Goalkeepers
1	GK	Sofiane Kacem	(Algeria)	3	3	0	1	1	0	4	4	0
16	GK	Abderrahmane Medjadel	(Algeria)	26	26	0	0	0	0	26	26	0
30	GK	Mohamed Medjadji	(Algeria)	1	1	0	0	0	0	1	1	0
Defenders
3	CB	Mohamed El Amine Barka	(Algeria)	7	4	0	0	0	0	7	4	0
5	CB	Tarek Bouabta	(Algeria)	5	3	0	0	0	0	5	3	0
13	CB	Abderrahim Hamra	(Algeria)	24	24	0	1	1	1	25	25	1
20	LB	Belkacem Brahimi	(Algeria)	28	28	1	1	1	0	29	29	1
22	RB	Mokhtar Belkhiter	(Algeria)	21	14	0	1	1	0	22	15	0
23	CB	Achref Abada	(Algeria)	29	28	0	1	1	0	30	29	0
26	RB	Abdelhak Debbari	(Algeria)	18	15	0	0	0	0	18	15	0
28	CB	Abdelillah Badani	(Algeria)	0	0	0	0	0	0	0	0	0
29	LB	Houssam Kellouche	(Algeria)	0	0	0	0	0	0	0	0	0
Midfielders
6	DM	Gape Mohutsiwa	(Botswana)	25	23	0	0	0	0	25	23	0
8	AM	Abdelkader Boussaid	(Algeria)	13	6	0	0	0	0	13	6	0
10	AM	Imad Eddine Larbi	(Algeria)	24	21	0	1	0	0	25	21	0
12	DM	Ismael Moussa	(Niger)	10	3	0	1	1	0	11	4	0
14	RM	Ayoub Sadahine	(Algeria)	27	16	4	1	1	0	28	17	0
15	AM	Redouane Bounoua	(Algeria)	27	16	1	1	0	0	28	16	1
18	DM	Mohamed Ilyas Abboub	(Algeria)	1	1	0	1	0	0	2	1	0
21	CM	Ibrahim Farhi Benhalima	(Algeria)	28	27	0	1	1	0	29	28	0
Forwards
2	FW	Anis Elhadj Benchouya	(Algeria)	23	6	2	1	0	0	24	6	2
7	ST	Yawo Agbagno	(Togo)	27	26	10	1	1	0	28	27	10
11	RW	Zineddine Boutmène	(Algeria)	7	2	0	0	0	0	7	2	0
17	RW	Moussa Boukhenna	(Algeria)	16	6	1	0	0	0	16	6	1
24	LW	Edward Ledlum	(Liberia)	15	13	2	0	0	0	15	13	2
25	ST	Kokou Avotor	(Togo)	14	2	2	0	0	0	14	2	2
27	LW	Mustapha Alili	(Algeria)	16	9	0	1	0	0	17	9	0
32	FW	Belkacem Bakhtouchi	(Algeria)	4	0	0	1	0	0	5	0	0
Players transferred out during the season
~~4~~	AM	Abderrahmane Bourdim	(Algeria)	13	6	1	1	1	0	14	7	1
~~11~~	FW	Belkacem Bourorga	(Algeria)	6	1	0	0	0	0	6	1	0
Total				30		24	1		1	31		25

Last updated: 21 June 2025
Source: mondefootball.fr

=== Goalscorers ===
As of 21 June 2025

Includes all competitive matches.

No.	Nat.	Player	Pos.	L1	AC	TOTAL
7	(Togo)	Yawo Agbagno	FW	10	0	10
14	(Algeria)	Ayoub Sadahine	RM	4	0	4
25	(Togo)	Kokou Avotor	ST	2	0	2
2	(Algeria)	Anis Benchouya	ST	2	0	2
24	(Liberia)	Edward Ledlum	LW	2	0	2
4	(Algeria)	Abderrahmane Bourdim	AM	1	0	1
17	(Algeria)	Moussa Boukhenna	RW	1	0	1
15	(Algeria)	Redouane Bounoua	AM	1	0	1
20	(Algeria)	Belkacem Brahimi	LB	1	0	1
13	(Algeria)	Abderrahim Hamra	CB	0	1	1
Own Goals				0	0	0
Totals				24	1	25

=== Clean sheets ===
As of 21 June 2025

Includes all competitive matches.

					Clean sheets		
No.	Nat	Name	GP	GA	L 1	AC	Total
1	(Algeria)	Sofiane Kacem	4	8	0	0	0
16	(Algeria)	Abderrahmane Medjadel	26	20	12	0	12
30	(Algeria)	Mohamed Medjadji	1	1	0	0	0
		TOTALS		29	12	0	12
