= 2025–26 ASO Chlef season =

ASO Chlef
2025–26 season
- President: Abdelkrim Medouar
- Head coach: Fouad Bouali (from 21 July 2025) (until 13 January 2026); Abdelhaq Belaid (from 13 January 2026)
- Stadium: Mohamed Boumezrag Stadium
- Ligue 1: 13th
- Algerian Cup: Round of 16
- Top goalscorer: League: Chemseddine Bekkouche (5 goals); All: Chemseddine Bekkouche (6 goals)
- Biggest win: ASO Chlef 2–0 MC El Bayadh
- Biggest defeat: MC Alger 2–0 ASO Chlef
Home colours	Away colours

The 2025–26 season, is ASO Chlef's 35th season and the club's 7th consecutive season in the top flight of Algerian football. In addition to the domestic league, ASO Chlef are participating in this season's editions of the Algerian Cup. The Algerian Professional Football League (LFP) officially released the calendar for the 2025–26 Ligue 1 Mobilis season on July 10, 2025. The Ligue 1 will kick off on Thursday, August 21, 2025, and conclude with the 30th and final matchday on May 16, 2026. As in recent years, league matches will be held every Thursday, Friday, and Saturday, offering better scheduling balance and improved logistical conditions for clubs and broadcasters.

== Squad list ==
Players and squad numbers last updated on 31 January 2026.
Note: Flags indicate national team as has been defined under FIFA eligibility rules. Players may hold more than one non-FIFA nationality.

No.	Nat.	Name	Position	Date of birth (age)	Signed from
Goalkeepers
16	(Algeria)	Abderrahmane Medjadel	GK	1 July 1998 (aged 27)	(Algeria) MSP Batna
30	(Algeria)	Chamseddine Rahmani	GK	15 September 1990 (aged 34)	Unattached
Defenders
3	(Algeria)	Mohamed El Amine Barka	CB	20 March 1993 (aged 32)	(Algeria) MC El Bayadh
4	(Algeria)	Zakaria Abdelli	CB	20 April 2004 (aged 21)	(Algeria) MC Alger
6	(Algeria)	Ayoub Sadahine	RB	16 June 2001 (aged 24)	(Algeria) SKAF Khemis Miliana
14	(Algeria)	Karim Azzouz	LB	24 September 2005 (aged 19)	(Algeria) Reserve team
15	(Algeria)	Chemseddine Bekkouche	LB	13 March 2001 (aged 24)	(Spain) Atlético Levante UD
20	(Algeria)	Belkacem Brahimi	LB	20 January 1994 (aged 31)	(Algeria) ES Sétif
21	(Algeria)	Tarek Bouabta	CB	21 July 1991 (aged 34)	(Bahrain) Al-Khaldiya SC
24	(Algeria)	Fouad Rahmani	CB	3 January 2002 (aged 23)	(Algeria) MB Rouissat
26	(Algeria)	Abdelhak Debbari	RB	6 January 1993 (aged 32)	(Algeria) HB Chelghoum Laïd
Midfielders
5	(Algeria)	Ibrahim Farhi Benhalima	CM	16 April 1997 (aged 28)	(Algeria) JS Saoura
8	(Algeria)	Mohamed Abboub	DM	27 May 2003 (aged 22)	(Algeria) Reserve team
10	(Algeria)	Imadeddine Larbi	AM	31 July 2002 (aged 23)	(Algeria) GC Mascara
12	(Niger)	Ismael Moussa	DM	1 January 2002 (aged 23)	(Spain) Granada CF
13	(Algeria)	Dalil Hassen Khodja	CM	3 April 1999 (aged 26)	(Algeria) MC Oran
17	(Algeria)	Samir Aiboud	CM	11 February 1993 (aged 32)	(Algeria) USM Khenchela
18	(Algeria)	Djamel Belalem	DM	12 August 1993 (aged 32)	(Algeria) MC El Bayadh
29	(Algeria)	Dahmane Bounoua	AM	20 March 2006 (aged 19)	(Algeria) Reserve team
Forwards
2	(Algeria)	Anis Benchouya	ST	6 September 2002 (aged 22)	(Algeria) Reserve team
11	(Algeria)	Yasser Belaribi	LW	22 January 1999 (aged 26)	Unattached
19	(Algeria)	Aymen Kouadri Habbaz	LW	2 March 2005 (aged 20)	(Algeria) Reserve team
22	(Liberia)	Edward Ledlum	LW	15 June 1999 (aged 26)	(Liberia) Paynesville FC
25	(Togo)	Kokou Avotor	ST	17 November 2000 (aged 24)	(Togo) AS OTR Lomé
27	(Algeria)	Aissa Feddal	RW	29 May 2005 (aged 20)	(Algeria) Reserve team

== Transfers ==
=== In ===
==== Summer ====
Date	Pos	Player	Moving from	Fee	Source
26 August 2025	DM	(Algeria) Djamel Belalem	MC El Bayadh	Free transfer	
26 August 2025	DM	(Algeria) Dalil Hassen Khodja	MC Oran	Free transfer	
26 August 2025	LB	(Algeria) Chemseddine Bekkouche	(Spain) Granada CF	Free transfer	
31 August 2025	CB	(Algeria) Zakaria Abdelli	MC Alger	Free transfer	

==== Winter ====
Date	Pos	Player	Moving to	Fee	Source
27 January 2026	CB	(Algeria) Fouad Rahmani	MB Rouissat	Free transfer	
27 January 2026	GK	(Algeria) Chamseddine Rahmani	Unattached	Free transfer	
31 January 2026	CM	(Algeria) Samir Aiboud	ASO Chlef	Free transfer	
31 January 2026	LW	(Algeria) Yasser Belaribi	Unattached	Free transfer	

=== Out ===
==== Summer ====
Date	Pos	Player	Moving to	Fee	Source
14 July 2025	DF	(Algeria) Abderrahim Hamra	MC Oran	Free transfer	
24 July 2025	MF	(Botswana) Gape Mohutsiwa	MC Oran	Free transfer	
25 July 2025	DF	(Algeria) Mokhtar Belkhiter	MC Oran	Free transfer	

==== Winter ====
Date	Pos	Player	Moving to	Fee	Source
27 January 2026	CB	(Algeria) Abdelillah Badani	Unattached	Free transfer (Released)	
27 January 2026	RW	(Algeria) Zineddine Boutmène	Unattached	Free transfer (Released)	
31 January 2026	GK	(Algeria) Mohamed Medjadji	MO Béjaïa	Free transfer	
31 January 2026	GK	(Algeria) Ali Tergou	Unattached	Free transfer (Released)	
31 January 2026	CB	(Algeria) Achref Abada	USM Alger	Undisclosed	

== Competitions ==
=== Overview ===
Competition	Record								Started round	Final position / round	First match	Last match
Competition	G	W	D	L	GF	GA	GD	Win %	Started round	Final position / round	First match	Last match
Ligue 1	30	9	7	14	26	31	−5	30.00	—N/a	13th	23 August 2025	5 June 2026
Algerian Cup	3	2	0	1	2	1	+1	66.67	Round of 64	Round of 16	5 December 2025	16 January 2026
Total	33	11	7	15	28	32	−4	33.33				

Updated to match played 5 June 2026
Source: Competitions

=== Ligue 1 ===
==== League table ====
Pos	Team	Pld	W	D	L	GF	GA	GD	Pts	Qualification or relegation
11	ES Sétif	30	10	9	11	33	36	−3	39	
12	MB Rouissat	30	9	9	12	30	35	−5	36	
13	ASO Chlef	30	9	7	14	26	31	−5	34	
14	Paradou AC (R)	30	7	3	20	35	54	−19	24	Relegation to Algerian League 2
15	ES Mostaganem (R)	30	4	7	19	18	52	−34	19	Relegation to Algerian League 2

Source: lfp.dz
Rules for classification: 1) Points; 2) Head-to-head points; 3) Head-to-head goal difference; 4) First half goal difference; 5) First half total goals; 6) Fairplay ranking; 7) Playoff.
(R) Relegated

==== Results summary ====
Overall								Home						Away					
Pld	W	D	L	GF	GA	GD	Pts	W	D	L	GF	GA	GD	W	D	L	GF	GA	GD
30	9	7	14	26	31	−5	34	7	2	6	14	12	+2	2	5	8	12	19	−7

Last updated: 5 June 2026.
Source: Competitive matches

==== Results by round ====
Round	1	2	3	4	5	6	7	8	9	10	11	12	13	14	15	16	17	18	19	20	21	22	23	24	25	26	27	28	29	30
Ground	A	H	A	H	A	H	A	A	H	A	H	A	H	A	H	H	A	H	A	H	A	H	H	A	H	A	H	A	H	A
Result	D	L	L	W	D	D	D	W	L	L	L	L	W	L	D	W	D	L	W	L	D	W	W	L	W	L	W	L	L	L
Position	9	13	14	11	10	10	12	11	12	12	13	14	13	14	14	13	13	13	12	13	13	13	13	13	12	12	11	11	13	13

Updated to match(es) played on 5 June 2026. Source: Competitive matches
A = Away; H = Home; W = Win; D = Draw; L = Loss

==== Matches ====
The league fixtures were announced on 31 July 2025.

All times are local, WAT (UTC+1).

Win Draw Loss Postponed

23 August 2025 Round 1	Paradou AC	0–0	ASO Chlef	Dar El Beïda
17:00		Soccerway; LFP		Stadium: Omar Benrabah Stadium; Referee: Mustapha Ghorbal; VAR: Ghada Mehat

30 August 2025 Round 2	ASO Chlef	1–2	USM Khenchela	Chlef
19:00	Sadahine 59'	Soccerway; LFP	Driss 24'; Djaouchi (0++7)	Stadium: Mohamed Boumezrag Stadium; Referee: Tayeb Benyabka

5 September 2025 Round 3	JS Saoura	1–0	ASO Chlef	Béchar
20:00	Hammia 22'	Soccerway; LFP		Stadium: 20 August 1955 Stadium; Referee: Youcef Taieb Bouderbal

13 September 2025 Round 4	ASO Chlef	2–0	MC El Bayadh	Chlef
17:00	Benchouya 30'; Bekkouche 85'	Soccerway; LFP		Stadium: Mohamed Boumezrag Stadium; Referee: Mehdi Oukil; VAR: Mustapha Ghorbal

19 September 2025 Round 5	CS Constantine	2–2	ASO Chlef	Constantine
17:45	Mouaki 66', 77'	Soccerway; LFP	Sadahine 33'; Avotor 68'	Stadium: Chahid Hamlaoui Stadium; Referee: Akram Mechairia; VAR: Alaa Bouab

27 September 2025 Round 6	ASO Chlef	1–1	MB Rouissat	Chlef
17:00	Sadahine 12'	Soccerway; LFP	Nezla 90+2'	Stadium: Mohamed Boumezrag Stadium; Referee: Rafik Aouina; VAR: Lahlou Benbraham

4 October 2025 Round 7	ES Sétif	1–1	ASO Chlef	Sétif
16:00	Zerrouki 49'	Soccerway; LFP	Hassen Khodja 52'	Stadium: 8 May 1945 Stadium; Referee: Abdelali Ibrir; VAR: Redouane Allou

17 October 2025 Round 8	ES Mostaganem	0–1	ASO Chlef	Mostaganem
18:00		Soccerway; LFP	Bekkouche 65'	Stadium: Mohamed Bensaïd Stadium; Referee: Fateh Harkat

29 October 2025 Round 9	ASO Chlef	0–1	CR Belouizdad	Chlef
17:00		Soccerway; LFP	Laouafi 7'	Stadium: Mohamed Boumezrag Stadium; Referee: Nabil Boukhalfa

2 November 2025 Round 10	USM Alger	1–0	ASO Chlef	Baraki
19:00	Draoui 31'	Soccerway; LFP		Stadium: Nelson Mandela Stadium; Referee: Lahlou Benbraham

9 November 2025 Round 11	ASO Chlef	1–2	ES Ben Aknoun	Chlef
17:45	Ledlum 49'	Soccerway; LFP	Souibaâh 26'; Oukali 90+7'	Stadium: Mohamed Boumezrag Stadium; Referee: Youcef Taieb Bouderbal

21 November 2025 Round 12	Olympique Akbou	2–1	ASO Chlef	Béjaïa
14:45	Hitala 42'; Addadi 46'	Soccerway; LFP	Feddal 87'	Stadium: Maghrebi Unity Stadium; Referee: Haithem Ghouti

18 December 2025 Round 13	ASO Chlef	1–0	MC Oran	Chlef
17:00	Sadahine 45+3'	Soccerway; LFP		Stadium: Mohamed Boumezrag Stadium; Referee: Akram Mechairia

27 December 2025 Round 14	JS Kabylie	2–1	ASO Chlef	Tizi Ouzou
17:00	Boudebouz 15'; Messaoudi 50'	Soccerway; LFP	Feddal 19'	Stadium: Hocine Aït Ahmed Stadium; Referee: Mehdi Oukil

9 January 2026 Round 15	ASO Chlef	0–0	MC Alger	Chlef
16:00		Soccerway; LFP		Stadium: Mohamed Boumezrag Stadium; Referee: Rafik Aouina

23 January 2026 Round 16	ASO Chlef	2–0	Paradou AC	Chlef
16:00	Ledlum 29'; Bekkouche 49'	Soccerway; LFP		Stadium: Mohamed Boumezrag Stadium; Referee: Alaa Bouab

4 February 2026 Round 17	USM Khenchela	2–2	ASO Chlef	Khenchela
15:00	Djaouchi 20'; Chekal 62'	Soccerway; LFP	Farhi 11'; Ledlum 49'	Stadium: Amar Hamam Stadium; Referee: Youcef Tayeb Bouderbal

8 February 2026 Round 18	ASO Chlef	0–1	JS Saoura	Chlef
16:00		Soccerway; LFP	Bentaleb 30'	Stadium: Mohamed Boumezrag Stadium; Referee: Akram Mechairia

13 February 2026 Round 19	MC El Bayadh	0–1	ASO Chlef	El Bayadh
15:00		Soccerway; LFP	Farhi 90+2'	Stadium: Zakaria Medjdoub Stadium; Referee: Nabil Boukhalfa

20 February 2026 Round 20	ASO Chlef	0–2	CS Constantine	Chlef
22:00		Soccerway; LFP	Rebiaï 8'; Agbagno 60'	Stadium: Mohamed Boumezrag Stadium; Referee: Mehdi Oukil

28 February 2026 Round 21	MB Rouissat	1–1	ASO Chlef	Ouargla
22:00	Benkheira 45'	Soccerway; LFP	Avotor 51'	Stadium: 18 February Stadium; Referee: Lotfi Bekouassa

6 March 2026 Round 22	ASO Chlef	1–0	ES Sétif	Chlef
22:00	Avotor 78'	Soccerway; LFP		Stadium: Mohamed Boumezrag Stadium; Referee: Yahia Dahar

13 March 2026 Round 23	ASO Chlef	1–0	ES Mostaganem	Chlef
22:00	Farhi 81'	Soccerway; LFP		Stadium: Mohamed Boumezrag Stadium; Referee: Mustapha Ghorbal

18 March 2026 Round 24	CR Belouizdad	2–1	ASO Chlef	Baraki
22:00	Belkhir 20' (pen.); Ben Hammouda 61'	Soccerway; LFP	Debbari 25'	Stadium: Nelson Mandela Stadium; Referee: Haitham Ghouti

5 April 2026 Round 25	ASO Chlef	2–1	USM Alger	Chlef
17:45	Benchouya 36'; Debbari 68' (pen.)	Soccerway; LFP	Tendeng 27'	Stadium: Mohamed Boumezrag Stadium; Referee: Abdelali Ibrir

10 April 2026 Round 26	ES Ben Aknoun	2–1	ASO Chlef	Belouizdad
16:00	Djabout 1'; Sylla 45+2'	Soccerway; LFP	Bekkouche 65'	Stadium: 20 August 1955 Stadium; Referee: Fateh Harkat

17 April 2026 Round 27	ASO Chlef	1–0	Olympique Akbou	Chlef
17:45	Debbari 18' (pen.)	Soccerway; LFP		Stadium: Mohamed Boumezrag Stadium; Referee: Yahia Dahar

7 May 2026 Round 28	MC Oran	1–0	ASO Chlef	Bir El Djir
20:00	Kerroum 59'	Soccerway; LFP		Stadium: Miloud Hadefi Stadium; Referee: Lahlou Benbraham

20 May 2026 Round 29	ASO Chlef	1–2	JS Kabylie	Chlef
17:45	Bekkouche 19'	Soccerway; LFP	Malki 30'; Akhrib 72'	Stadium: Mohamed Boumezrag Stadium; Referee: Dhikra Houia

5 June 2026 Round 30	MC Alger	2–0	ASO Chlef	Douéra
18:30	Bangoura 18'; Bayazid 87'	Soccerway; LFP		Stadium: Ali La Pointe Stadium; Referee: Tayeb Benyebka

=== Algerian Cup ===
5 December 2025 Round of 64	ASO Chlef	1–0	CA Sidi Abdelmoumen	Chlef
16:00	Avotor 32'	Report		Stadium: Mohamed Boumezrag Stadium; Referee: Zinelaabidine Dakhane

12 December 2025 Round of 32	FCB Frenda	0–1	ASO Chlef	Frenda
14:30		Report	Bekkouche 43'	Stadium: Mohamed Tahar Chaouch Stadium; Referee: Mehadji Tayeb Bouderbal

16 January 2026 Round of 16	ASO Chlef	0–1	MC Saïda	Chlef
16:00		Report	Benouis 61'	Stadium: Mohamed Boumezrag Stadium; Referee: Bilal Bendjahene

== Squad information ==
=== Appearances and goals ===
As of 5 June 2026

No.	Pos	Player	Nat	Ligue 1			Algerian Cup			Total		
No.	Pos	Player	Nat	App	St	G	App	St	G	App	St	G
Goalkeepers
16	GK	Abderrahmane Medjadel	(Algeria)	20	20	0	3	3	0	23	23	0
30	GK	Chamseddine Rahmani	(Algeria)	4	4	0	0	0	0	4	4	0
Defenders
3	CB	Mohamed El Amine Barka	(Algeria)	20	17	0	2	2	0	22	19	0
4	CB	Zakaria Abdelli	(Algeria)	8	3	0	0	0	0	8	3	0
6	RB	Ayoub Sadahine	(Algeria)	29	29	4	3	3	0	32	32	4
14	LB	Karim Azzouz	(Algeria)	1	0	0	0	0	0	1	0	0
15	LB	Chemseddine Bekkouche	(Algeria)	27	18	5	3	2	1	30	20	6
20	LB	Belkacem Brahimi	(Algeria)	24	23	0	3	3	0	27	26	0
21	CB	Tarek Bouabta	(Algeria)	7	3	0	2	1	0	9	4	0
24	CB	Fouad Rahmani	(Algeria)	3	3	0	0	0	0	3	3	0
26	RB	Abdelhak Debbari	(Algeria)	29	29	3	3	3	0	32	32	3
Midfielders
5	CM	Ibrahim Farhi Benhalima	(Algeria)	25	22	3	3	2	0	28	24	3
8	DM	Mohamed Abboub	(Algeria)	16	9	0	2	2	0	18	11	0
10	AM	Imadeddine Larbi	(Algeria)	20	5	0	2	2	0	22	7	0
12	DM	Ismael Moussa	(Niger)	25	22	0	2	1	0	27	23	0
13	CM	Dalil Hassen Khodja	(Algeria)	17	10	1	2	1	0	19	11	1
17	CM	Samir Aiboud	(Algeria)	13	5	0	0	0	0	13	5	0
18	DM	Djamel Belalem	(Algeria)	21	18	0	1	1	0	22	19	0
29	AM	Dahmane Bounoua	(Algeria)	1	0	0	0	0	0	1	0	0
Forwards
2	ST	Anis Elhadj Benchouya	(Algeria)	24	7	2	3	1	0	27	8	2
11	LW	Yasser Belaribi	(Algeria)	9	2	0	0	0	0	9	2	0
19	LW	Aymen Kouadri Habbaz	(Algeria)	8	0	0	3	0	0	11	0	0
22	LW	Edward Ledlum	(Liberia)	28	25	3	3	2	0	31	27	3
25	ST	Kokou Avotor	(Togo)	28	24	3	3	2	1	31	26	4
27	RW	Aissa Feddal	(Algeria)	23	7	2	2	2	0	25	9	2
Players transferred out during the season
~~28~~	CB	Abdelillah Badani	(Algeria)	0	0	0	0	0	0	0	0	0
~~11~~	RW	Zineddine Boutmène	(Algeria)	13	7	0	0	0	0	13	7	0
~~1~~	GK	Mohamed Medjadji	(Algeria)	6	6	0	0	0	0	6	6	0
~~30~~	GK	Ali Tergou	(Algeria)	0	0	0	0	0	0	0	0	0
~~23~~	CB	Achref Abada	(Algeria)	13	13	0	0	0	0	13	13	0
Total				30		26	3		2	33		28

Last updated: 5 June 2026
Source: soccerway.com

=== Goalscorers ===
As of 5 June 2026

Includes all competitive matches.

No.	Nat.	Player	Pos.	L1	AC	TOTAL
15	(Algeria)	Chemseddine Bekkouche	LB	5	1	6
14	(Algeria)	Ayoub Sadahine	RB	4	0	4
25	(Togo)	Kokou Avotor	ST	3	1	4
22	(Liberia)	Edward Ledlum	LW	3	0	3
5	(Algeria)	Ibrahim Farhi Benhalima	CM	3	0	3
26	(Algeria)	Abdelhak Debbari	RB	3	0	3
27	(Algeria)	Aissa Feddal	RW	2	0	2
2	(Algeria)	Anis Benchouya	ST	2	0	2
13	(Algeria)	Dalil Hassen Khodja	CM	1	0	1
Own Goals				0	0	0
Totals				26	2	28

=== Clean sheets ===
As of 5 June 2026

Includes all competitive matches.

					Clean sheets		
No.	Nat	Name	GP	GA	L1	AC	Total
16	(Algeria)	Abderrahmane Medjadel	23	20	8	2	10
30	(Algeria)	Chamseddine Rahmani	3	6	0	0	0
Players transferred out during the season
~~1~~	(Algeria)	Mohamed Medjadji	6	6	2	0	2
~~30~~	(Algeria)	Ali Tergou	0	0	0	0	0
		TOTALS		32	10	2	12
