= 2023–24 ASO Chlef season =

ASO Chlef
2023–24 season
- President: Mohamed Ouahab
- Head coach: Abdelkader Yaiche (from 12 August 2023) (until 9 October 2023); Kais Yaâkoubi (from 25 October 2023) (until 10 January 2024); Chérif Hadjar (from 15 January 2024)
- Ligue 1: 8th
- Algerian Cup: Round of 32
- Confederation Cup: First round
- Top goalscorer: League: Yawo Agbagno (12 goals); All: Yawo Agbagno (13 goals)
- Biggest win: ASO Chlef 4–1 USM Khenchela
- Biggest defeat: MC Alger 6–3 ASO Chlef
Home colours	Away colours	Third colours

The 2023–24 season, is ASO Chlef's 33rd season and the club's 5th consecutive season in the top flight of Algerian football. In addition to the domestic league, ASO Chlef are participating in this season's editions of the Algerian Cup and the CAF Confederation Cup.

== Squad list ==
Players and squad numbers last updated on 5 February 2024.
Note: Flags indicate national team as has been defined under FIFA eligibility rules. Players may hold more than one non-FIFA nationality.

No.	Nat.	Position	Name	Date of Birth (Age)	Signed from
Goalkeepers
1	(Algeria)	GK	Sofiane Kacem	11 January 1993 (aged 30)	(Algeria) JSM Skikda
16	(Algeria)	GK	Mohamed Alaouchiche	11 April 1993 (aged 30)	(Algeria) DRB Tadjenanet
Defenders
3	(Algeria)	LB	Chemseddine Nessakh	4 January 1988 (aged 35)	(Algeria) CR Belouizdad
12	(Algeria)	CB	Achref Abada	15 June 1999 (aged 24)	(Algeria) MC El Eulma
13	(Algeria)	CB	Abderrahim Hamra	21 July 1997 (aged 26)	Unattached
22	(Algeria)	RB	Fateh Achour	15 August 1994 (aged 29)	(Algeria) USM Alger
24	(Algeria)	CB	Mohamed Roufid Arab	24 July 1990 (aged 33)	(Algeria) SKAF Khemis Miliana
26	(Algeria)	RB	Abdelhak Debbari	6 January 1993 (aged 30)	(Algeria) HB Chelghoum Laïd
Midfielders
4	(Algeria)	MF	Abderrahmane Bourdim	14 June 1994 (aged 29)	(Saudi Arabia) Hajer FC
5	(Algeria)	MF	Ahmida Zenasni	10 July 1993 (aged 30)	(Algeria) WA Tlemcen
6	(Botswana)	MF	Gape Mohutsiwa	20 March 1997 (aged 26)	(Botswana) Jwaneng Galaxy
8	(Algeria)	MF	Abdelkader Boussaid	19 March 1992 (aged 31)	(Algeria) JSM Skikda
10	(Algeria)	MF	Juba Aguieb	28 November 1996 (aged 26)	(Algeria) USM El Harrach
15	(Algeria)	MF	Redouane Bounoua	1 November 1998 (aged 24)	(Algeria) WA Tlemcen
18	(Algeria)	MF	Toufik Addadi	7 October 1990 (aged 32)	(Tunisia) US Monastir
20	(Algeria)	MF	Kamel Belarbi	11 April 1997 (aged 26)	(Algeria) USM Alger
21	(Algeria)	MF	Ibrahim Farhi Benhalima	16 April 1997 (aged 26)	(Algeria) JS Saoura
30	(Algeria)	MF	Rayane Choukri	20 May 2002 (aged 21)	Unattached
Forwards
7	(Togo)	FW	Yawo Agbagno	25 May 2000 (aged 23)	(Togo) AS OTR Lomé
9	(Algeria)	FW	Ayyoub Kersani	10 April 2001 (aged 22)	(Algeria) Youth system
11	(Algeria)	FW	Yacine Aliane	28 August 1999 (aged 24)	(Algeria) USM Alger
14	(Algeria)	FW	Boualem Sryer	8 June 2001 (aged 22)	(Algeria) Youth system
17	(Algeria)	FW	Zakaria Haddouche	19 August 1993 (aged 30)	Unattached
19	(Algeria)	FW	Dhiyaeddine Benyahia	13 July 2000 (aged 23)	(Algeria) JS Saoura
23	(Algeria)	FW	Redouane Zerdoum	1 January 1999 (aged 24)	(Algeria) JS Kabylie
27	(Algeria)	FW	Mostapha Alili	30 November 1996 (aged 26)	(Algeria) JS Kabylie

== Transfers ==
=== In ===
==== Summer ====
Date	Pos	Player	Moving from	Fee	Source
25 July 2023	FW	(Togo) Yawo Agbagno	(Togo) AS OTR Lomé	Free transfer	
30 July 2023	FW	(Algeria) Abdelaziz Moulay	ES Mostaganem	Free transfer	
27 August 2023	FW	(Algeria) Mostapha Alili	JS Kabylie	Free transfer	
1 September 2023	FW	(Algeria) Rayane Choukri	Unattached	Free transfer	
8 September 2023	FW	(Algeria) Redouane Zerdoum	JS Kabylie	Free transfer	

==== Winter ====
Date	Pos	Player	Moving from	Fee	Source
2 February 2024	MF	(Algeria) Abderrahmane Bourdim	(Saudi Arabia) Hajer FC	Free transfer	
5 February 2024	MF	(Algeria) Ibrahim Farhi Benhalima	JS Saoura	Free transfer	
5 February 2024	FW	(Algeria) Dhiyaeddine Benyahia	JS Saoura	Free transfer	

=== Out ===
==== Summer ====
Date	Pos	Player	Moving to	Fee	Source
3 July 2023	FW	(Algeria) Nour El Islam Fettouhi	USM Alger	Free transfer	
16 July 2023	FW	(Algeria) Ibrahim Morsli	MC Alger	Loan return	
2 September 2023	GK	(Algeria) Youssouf Benhemada	Unattached	Free transfer (Released)	
2 September 2023	FW	(Algeria) Amine Ghodbane	Unattached	Free transfer (Released)	
3 September 2023	FW	(Algeria) Mohamed Benbournane	Unattached	Free transfer (Released)	

==== Winter ====
Date	Pos	Player	Moving to	Fee	Source
31 January 2024	DF	(Algeria) Ahmed Kerroum	ASO Chlef	Undisclosed	
4 February 2024	FW	(Algeria) Abdelaziz Moulay	ES Sétif	Undisclosed	
5 February 2024	FW	(Algeria) Mohamed Souibaâh	JS Saoura	Free transfer	

=== New contracts ===
No.	Pos	Player	Contract length	Contract end	Date	Source
1	GK	Sofiane Kacem	2 years	2025	20 July 2023	
16	GK	Mohamed Alaouchiche	2 years	2023	20 July 2025	
8	MF	Abdelkader Boussaid	2 years	2025	20 July 2023	

== Competitions ==
=== Overview ===
Competition	Record								Started round	Final position / round	First match	Last match
Competition	G	W	D	L	GF	GA	GD	Win %	Started round	Final position / round	First match	Last match
Ligue 1	30	11	8	11	41	40	+1	36.67	—N/a	8th	15 September 2023	14 June 2024
Algerian Cup	2	1	1	0	4	3	+1	50.00	Round of 64	Round of 32	2 February 2024	8 March 2024
Confederation Cup	2	1	0	1	1	1	+0	50.00	First round	First round	19 August 2023	26 August 2023
Total	34	13	9	12	46	44	+2	38.24				

Updated to match played 14 June 2024
Source: Competitions

=== Ligue 1 ===
==== League table ====
Pos	Team	Pld	W	D	L	GF	GA	GD	Pts
6	Paradou AC	30	11	9	10	36	22	+14	42
7	JS Kabylie	30	10	12	8	33	27	+6	42
8	ASO Chlef	30	11	8	11	41	40	+1	41
9	JS Saoura	30	11	7	12	34	37	−3	40
10	USM Khenchela	30	11	6	13	33	39	−6	39

Source: the-sports.org
Rules for classification: 1) points; 2) head-to-head points; 3) head-to-head goal difference; 4) goal difference; 5) total goals; 6) fairplay ranking; 7) playoff.

==== Results summary ====
Overall								Home						Away					
Pld	W	D	L	GF	GA	GD	Pts	W	D	L	GF	GA	GD	W	D	L	GF	GA	GD
30	11	8	11	40	39	+1	41	8	4	3	21	12	+9	3	4	8	19	27	−8

Last updated: 14 June 2024.
Source: Competitive matches

==== Results by round ====
Round	1	2	3	4	5	6	7	8	9	10	11	12	13	14	15	16	17	18	19	20	21	22	23	24	25	26	27	28	29	30
Ground	H	A	H	A	H	H	A	H	A	H	A	H	A	H	A	A	H	A	H	A	A	H	A	H	A	H	A	H	A	H
Result	W	D	W	L	L	W	L	W	D	D	L	L	L	D	L	D	W	L	W	L	D	L	W	D	W	W	L	D	W	W
Position	3	2	2	5	8	5	8	6	6	6	10	12	13	13	13	12	12	13	12	12	12	13	12	12	12	9	10	12	10	8

Updated to match(es) played on 14 June 2024. Source: Competitive matches
A = Away; H = Home; W = Win; D = Draw; L = Loss

==== Matches ====
The league fixtures were announced on 24 August 2023.

All times are local, WAT (UTC+1).

Win Draw Loss Postponed

15 September 2023 Round 1	ASO Chlef	2–0	MC Oran	Chlef
19:00	Addadi 47'; Aliane 62'	Report		Stadium: Mohamed Boumezrag Stadium; Referee: Abdelali Ibrir

22 September 2023 Round 2	ES Ben Aknoun	2–2	ASO Chlef	Belouizdad
16:00	Hachoud 12' (pen.); Talah 90+2'	Report	Souibaâh 33' (pen.); Belouchat 66' (o.g.)	Stadium: 20 August 1955 Stadium; Referee: Lahlou Benbraham

30 September 2023 Round 3	ASO Chlef	1–0	CS Constantine	Chlef
19:00	Agbagno 21'	Report		Stadium: Mohamed Boumezrag Stadium; Referee: Mehadji Tayeb Bouderbali

7 October 2023 Round 4	MC El Bayadh	1–0	ASO Chlef	El Bayadh
15:45	Hitala 18'	Report		Stadium: Zakaria Medjdoub Stadium; Referee: Hamza Bouslimani

11 November 2023 Round 5	ASO Chlef	0–1	MC Alger	Chlef
17:00		Report	Belaïli 3' (pen.)	Stadium: Mohamed Boumezrag Stadium; Referee: Youcef Gamouh

18 November 2023 Round 6	ASO Chlef	2–1	ES Sétif	Chlef
17:00	Yattou 28' (o.g.); Moulay 51'	Report	Zamoum 38'	Stadium: Mohamed Boumezrag Stadium; Referee: Rafik Aouina

25 November 2023 Round 7	JS Saoura	3–2	ASO Chlef	Béchar
17:45	Saâd 36'; Bellatreche 73' (pen.); Farhi 85'	Report	Agbagno 25', 45+5'	Stadium: 20 August 1955 Stadium; Referee: Mohamed Belekbir

2 December 2023 Round 8	ASO Chlef	2–0	US Souf	Chlef
16:45	Addadi 29' (pen.); Mohutsiwa 53'	Report		Stadium: Mohamed Boumezrag Stadium; Referee: Alaa Bouab

9 December 2023 Round 9	NC Magra	1–1	ASO Chlef	Magra
15:00	Bourahla 12'	Report	Kerroum 54'	Stadium: Boucheligue Brothers Stadium; Referee: Abderahmane Sahraoui

15 December 2023 Round 10	ASO Chlef	1–1	Paradou AC	Chlef
18:00	Aguieb 71'	Report	Boulbina 78'	Stadium: Mohamed Boumezrag Stadium; Referee: Mustapha Ghorbal

29 December 2023 Round 11	USM Khenchela	2–1	ASO Chlef	Khenchela
15:15	Omoyele 46', 90+2'	Report	Kerroum 48'	Stadium: Amar Hamam Stadium; Referee: Abdelmoumen Touabti

5 January 2024 Round 12	ASO Chlef	0–1	USM Alger	Chlef
15:45		Report	Merili 37'	Stadium: Mohamed Boumezrag Stadium; Referee: Nabil Boukhalfa

13 January 2024 Round 13	JS Kabylie	2–1	ASO Chlef	Tizi Ouzou
16:45	Berkane 34', 47'	Report	Souibaâh 58'	Stadium: 1 November 1954 Stadium; Referee: Akram Mechairia

19 January 2024 Round 14	ASO Chlef	0–0	CR Belouizdad	Chlef
15:45		Report		Stadium: Mohamed Boumezrag Stadium; Referee: Mohamed Saïdi

27 January 2024 Round 15	US Biskra	2–0	ASO Chlef	Biskra
16:00	Boussalem 40'; Siam 49'	Report		Stadium: 18 February Stadium; Referee: Anes Azrine

9 February 2024 Round 16	MC Oran	1–1	ASO Chlef	Oran
15:45	Ardji 45+1'	Report	Agbagno 21'	Stadium: Ahmed Zabana Stadium; Referee: Akram Mechairia

16 February 2024 Round 17	ASO Chlef	2–1	ES Ben Aknoun	Chlef
16:45	Bourdim 25'; Addadi 73'	Report	Hachoud 40'	Stadium: Mohamed Boumezrag Stadium; Referee: Rafik Aouina

24 February 2024 Round 18	CS Constantine	3–1	ASO Chlef	Constantine
16:45	Khaldi 11', 67'; Benchaira 81'	Report	Aguieb 22'	Stadium: Chahid Hamlaoui Stadium; Referee: Anes Azrine

2 March 2024 Round 19	ASO Chlef	2–1	MC El Bayadh	Chlef
16:45	Agbagno 31'; Bourdim 48' (pen.)	Report	Serraoui 90+8' (pen.)	Stadium: Mohamed Boumezrag Stadium; Referee: Mehadji Tayeb Bouderbal

14 March 2024 Round 20	MC Alger	6–3	ASO Chlef	Algiers
22:00	Abdellaoui 38'; Zougrana 48'; Naidji 50', 76'; Bayazid 55'; Merzougui 90'	Report	Hamra 13'; Aliane 40'; Bourdim 45+11'	Stadium: Stade du 5 Juillet; Referee: Mustapha Ghorbal

24 March 2024 Round 21	ES Sétif	0–0	ASO Chlef	Sétif
22:00		Report		Stadium: 8 May 1945 Stadium; Referee: Rafik Aouina

5 April 2024 Round 22	ASO Chlef	1–2	JS Saoura	Chlef
22:00	Zerdoum 90+5'	Report	Souibaâh 32'; Fettouhi 45+1'	Stadium: Mohamed Boumezrag Stadium; Referee: Lotfi Bekouassa

19 April 2024 Round 23	US Souf	0–2	ASO Chlef	El Oued
16:00		Report	Agbagno 37'; Bounoua 84'	Stadium: 1 November 1954 Stadium; Referee: Haithem Ghouti

27 April 2024 Round 24	ASO Chlef	2–2	NC Magra	Chlef
16:00	Nessakh 29'; Agbagno 34'	Report	Demane 13'; Boughanem 90+4'	Stadium: Mohamed Boumezrag Stadium; Referee: Alaa Bouab

11 May 2024 Round 25	Paradou AC	2–3	ASO Chlef	Dar El Beïda
17:00	Hamidi 59' (pen.); Boulbina 90'	Report	Bourdim 41' (pen.); Agbagno 45', 45+3'	Stadium: Omar Benrabah Stadium; Referee: Tahar Boudjemaa

17 May 2024 Round 26	ASO Chlef	4–1	USM Khenchela	Chlef
17:00	Agbagno 8', 47'; Farhi 42'; Aliane 83'	Report	Saâdou 11'	Stadium: Mohamed Boumezrag Stadium; Referee: Abderahmane Sahraoui

25 May 2024 Round 27	USM Alger	2–1	ASO Chlef	Belouizdad
17:00	Belkacemi 64'; Kanou 74'	Report	Bourdim 36'	Stadium: 20 August 1955 Stadium; Referee: Youcef Taieb Bouderbal

7 June 2024 Round 28	ASO Chlef	1–1	JS Kabylie	Chlef
16:45	Addadi 12' (pen.)	Report	Maâmeri 58'	Stadium: Mohamed Boumezrag Stadium; Referee: Hamza Bouslimani

11 June 2024 Round 29	CR Belouizdad	0–1	ASO Chlef	Baraki
16:45		Report	Bounoua 54'	Stadium: Nelson Mandela Stadium; Referee: Fodil Oukil

14 June 2024 Round 30	ASO Chlef	1–0	US Biskra	Chlef
16:45	Addadi 42'; Agbagno 52'	Report	Bouraada 78' (pen.)	Stadium: Mohamed Boumezrag Stadium; Referee: Massinissa Serdjane

=== Algerian Cup ===
2 February 2024 Round of 64	AB Barika	1–2	ASO Chlef	Barika
14:30	Zouaoui 9'	Report	Aliane 2'; Addadi 68'	Stadium: Mohamed Ghalmi Stadium; Referee: Massinissa Serdjane
Note: ASO Chlef Lineups: Kacem, Achour, Nessakh, Hamra, Abada (substituted off) 46' (Arab (substituted on) 46'), Mohutsiwa, Boussaid (substituted off) (Belarbi (substituted on) ), Aguieb (substituted off) (Kersani (substituted on) ), Aliane, Moulay (substituted off) (Addadi (substituted on) ), Agbagno.

8 March 2024 Round of 32	ASO Chlef	2–2	US Biskra	Chlef
15:00	Aguieb 45+2'; Agbagno 65'	Report	Boukarroum 20' (pen.); Rahmoun 45'	Stadium: Mohamed Boumezrag Stadium; Referee: Houssam Benyahia
Note: ASO Chlef Lineups: Alaouchiche, Achour (substituted off) 102' (Debbari (substituted on) 102'), Nessakh (substituted off) 102' (Haddouche (substituted on) 102'), Hamra, Arab, Zenasni (substituted off) 85' (Belarbi (substituted on) 85'), Farhi, Bourdim (substituted off) (Addadi (substituted on) 70'), Aguieb (substituted off) 102' (Benyahia (substituted on) 102'), Aliane, Agbagno.

=== Confederation Cup ===
==== Qualifying rounds ====
In the qualifying rounds, each tie will be played on a home-and-away two-legged basis. If the aggregate score will be tied after the second leg, the away goals rule was applied, and if still tied, extra time will not be played, and the penalty shoot-out will be used to determine the winner (Regulations III. 13 & 14).

===== First round =====
19 August 2023 First leg	Bendel Insurance (Nigeria)	1–0	(Algeria) ASO Chlef	Benin City
16:00 UTC+1	Osarenkhoe 42'	Report		Stadium: Samuel Ogbemudia Stadium; Referee: Aklesso Gnama (Togo)

26 August 2023 Second leg	ASO Chlef (Algeria)	1–0 (1–1 agg.) (3–4 p)	(Nigeria) Bendel Insurance	Rouïba
17:00 UTC+1	Aguieb 43'	Report		Stadium: Salem Mabrouki Stadium; Referee: Abdebasat Shaboob (Libya)

== Squad information ==
=== Playing statistics ===
No.	Pos	Nat	Player	Total		Ligue 1		Algerian Cup		Confederation Cup	
No.	Pos	Nat	Player	Apps	Goals	Apps	Goals	Apps	Goals	Apps	Goals
Goalkeepers
1	GK	(Algeria) ALG	Sofiane Kacem	15	0	14	0	1	0	0	0
16	GK	(Algeria) ALG	Mohamed Alaouchiche	19	0	16	0	1	0	2	0
40	GK	(Algeria) ALG	Mohamed Medjadji	1	0	1	0	0	0	0	0
Defenders
3	DF	(Algeria) ALG	Chemseddine Nessakh	27	1	23	1	2	0	2	0
12	DF	(Algeria) ALG	Achref Abada	31	0	29	0	1	0	1	0
13	DF	(Algeria) ALG	Abderrahim Hamra	30	1	26	1	2	0	2	0
22	DF	(Algeria) ALG	Fateh Achour	21	0	19	0	2	0	0	0
24	DF	(Algeria) ALG	Mohamed Roufid Arab	16	0	14	0	2	0	0	0
26	DF	(Algeria) ALG	Abdelhak Debbari	21	0	18	0	1	0	2	0
53	DF	(Algeria) ALG	Mohamed Badani	1	0	1	0	0	0	0	0
Midfielders
4	MF	(Algeria) ALG	Abderrahmane Bourdim	13	5	12	5	1	0	0	0
5	MF	(Algeria) ALG	Ahmida Zenasni	27	0	25	0	1	0	1	0
6	MF	(Botswana) BOT	Gape Mohutsiwa	18	1	15	1	1	0	2	0
8	MF	(Algeria) ALG	Abdelkader Boussaid	22	0	19	0	1	0	2	0
10	MF	(Algeria) ALG	Juba Aguieb	31	4	27	2	2	1	2	1
15	MF	(Algeria) ALG	Redouane Bounoua	7	2	7	2	0	0	0	0
18	MF	(Algeria) ALG	Toufik Addadi	30	6	26	5	2	1	2	0
20	MF	(Algeria) ALG	Kamel Belarbi	13	0	11	0	2	0	0	0
21	MF	(Algeria) ALG	Ibrahim Farhi Benhalima	16	1	15	1	1	0	0	0
45	MF	(Algeria) ALG	Ilyas Abboub	2	0	2	0	0	0	0	0
55	MF	(Algeria) ALG	Anis Elhadj Benchouya	4	0	4	0	0	0	0	0
Forwards
7	FW	(Togo) TOG	Yawo Agbagno	29	13	25	12	2	1	2	0
9	FW	(Algeria) ALG	Ayyoub Kersani	8	0	7	0	1	0	0	0
11	FW	(Algeria) ALG	Yacine Aliane	31	4	27	3	2	1	2	0
14	FW	(Algeria) ALG	Boualem Sryer	2	0	0	0	0	0	2	0
17	FW	(Algeria) ALG	Zakaria Haddouche	4	0	3	0	1	0	0	0
19	FW	(Algeria) ALG	Diaaeddine Benyahia	9	0	8	0	1	0	0	0
23	FW	(Algeria) ALG	Redouane Zerdoum	12	1	12	1	0	0	0	0
27	FW	(Algeria) ALG	Mostapha Alili	8	0	8	0	0	0	0	0
Players transferred out during the season
25	DF	(Algeria) ALG	Ahmed Kerroum	15	1	13	1	0	0	2	0
21	FW	(Algeria) ALG	Abdelaziz Moulay	18	1	15	1	1	0	2	0
19	FW	(Algeria) ALG	Mohamed Souibaâh	16	2	14	2	0	0	2	0

Last updated: 14 June 2024
Source: soccerway.com

=== Goalscorers ===
As of 14 June 2024

Includes all competitive matches.

No.	Nat.	Player	Pos.	L 1	AC	CCC	TOTAL
7	(Togo)	Yawo Agbagno	FW	12	1	0	13
18	(Algeria)	Toufik Addadi	MF	5	1	0	6
4	(Algeria)	Abderrahmane Bourdim	MF	5	0	0	5
10	(Algeria)	Juba Aguieb	MF	2	1	1	4
11	(Algeria)	Yacine Aliane	FW	3	1	0	4
25	(Algeria)	Ahmed Kerroum	DF	2	0	0	2
19	(Algeria)	Mohamed Souibaâh	FW	2	0	0	2
15	(Algeria)	Redouane Bounoua	MF	2	0	0	2
21	(Algeria)	Abdelaziz Moulay	FW	1	0	0	1
6	(Botswana)	Gape Mohutsiwa	MF	1	0	0	1
13	(Algeria)	Abderrahim Hamra	DF	1	0	0	1
23	(Algeria)	Redouane Zerdoum	FW	1	0	0	1
3	(Algeria)	Chemseddine Nessakh	DF	1	0	0	1
21	(Algeria)	Ibrahim Farhi Benhalima	MF	1	0	0	1
Own Goals				2	0	0	1
Totals				41	4	1	46
