= 2022–23 ASO Chlef season =

ASO Chlef
2022–23 season
- President: Mohamed Ouahab
- Head coach: Lyamine Bougherara (from 30 July 2022) (until 7 December 2022); Abdelkader Amrani (from 22 January 2023)
- Stadium: Tahar Zoughari Stadium; Mohamed Boumezrag Stadium
- Ligue 1: 7th
- Algerian Cup: Winners
- Top goalscorer: League: Mohamed Souibaâh (13 goals); All: Mohamed Souibaâh (16 goals)
- Biggest win: ASO Chlef 4–0 ES Sétif; ASO Chlef 4–0 HB Chelghoum Laïd
- Biggest defeat: CS Constantine 3–0 ASO Chlef
Home colours	Away colours

In the 2022–23 season, ASO Chlef are competing in the Ligue 1 for the 32nd season, as well as the Algerian Cup and Champions League. It is their 4th consecutive season in the top flight of Algerian football. They are competing in Ligue 1 and the Algerian Cup.

== Squad list ==
Players and squad numbers last updated on 5 February 2023.
Note: Flags indicate national team as has been defined under FIFA eligibility rules. Players may hold more than one non-FIFA nationality.

No.	Nat.	Position	Name	Date of birth (age)	Signed from
Goalkeepers
1	(Algeria)	GK	Sofiane Kacem	11 January 1993 (aged 29)	(Algeria) JSM Skikda
16	(Algeria)	GK	Mohamed Alaouchiche	11 April 1993 (aged 29)	(Algeria) DRB Tadjenanet
23	(Algeria)	GK	Youssouf Benhemada	26 July 1999 (aged 23)	(Algeria) Youth system
Defenders
3	(Algeria)	LB	Chemseddine Nessakh	4 January 1988 (aged 34)	(Algeria) CR Belouizdad
12	(Algeria)	CB	Achref Abada	15 June 1999 (aged 23)	(Algeria) MC El Eulma
13	(Algeria)	CB	Abderrahim Hamra	21 July 1997 (aged 25)	Unattached
22	(Algeria)	RB	Fateh Achour	15 August 1994 (aged 28)	(Algeria) USM Alger
24	(Algeria)	CB	Mohamed Roufid Arab	24 July 1990 (aged 32)	(Algeria) SKAF Khemis Miliana
25	(Algeria)	RB	Ahmed Kerroum	27 June 2000 (aged 22)	(Algeria) JS Kabylie
26	(Algeria)	RB	Abdelhak Debbari	6 January 1993 (aged 29)	(Algeria) HB Chelghoum Laïd
Midfielders
5	(Algeria)	MF	Ahmida Zenasni	10 July 1993 (aged 29)	(Algeria) WA Tlemcen
6	(Botswana)	MF	Gape Mohutsiwa	20 March 1997 (aged 25)	(Botswana) Jwaneng Galaxy
8	(Algeria)	MF	Abdelkader Boussaid	19 March 1992 (aged 30)	(Algeria) JSM Skikda
10	(Algeria)	MF	Juba Aguieb	28 November 1996 (aged 26)	(Algeria) USM El Harrach
15	(Algeria)	MF	Redouane Bounoua	1 November 1998 (aged 24)	(Algeria) WA Tlemcen
18	(Algeria)	MF	Toufik Addadi	7 October 1990 (aged 32)	(Tunisia) US Monastir
20	(Algeria)	MF	Kamel Belarbi	11 April 1997 (aged 25)	(Algeria) USM Alger
Forwards
7	(Algeria)	FW	Nour El Islam Fettouhi	28 August 1999 (aged 23)	(Algeria) Youth system
9	(Algeria)	FW	Mohamed El Seddik Benbournane	21 December 1997 (aged 25)	(Algeria) MC Alger
11	(Algeria)	FW	Yacine Aliane	28 August 1999 (aged 23)	(Algeria) USM Alger
14	(Algeria)	FW	Ibrahim Morsli	15 February 2000 (aged 22)	(Algeria) MC Alger
17	(Algeria)	FW	Zakaria Haddouche	19 August 1993 (aged 29)	Unattached
19	(Algeria)	FW	Mohamed Souibaâh	25 December 1991 (aged 31)	(Algeria) CR Belouizdad
21	(Algeria)	FW	Amine Ghodbane	4 October 1997 (aged 25)	(Algeria) CA Batna
27	(Algeria)	FW	Slim Jendoubi	25 May 1998 (aged 24)	(Tunisia) CA Bizertin

== Transfers ==
=== In ===
==== Summer ====
Date	Pos	Player	From club	Transfer fee	Source
22 July 2022	MF	(Botswana) Gape Mohutsiwa	(Botswana) Jwaneng Galaxy	Free transfer	
22 July 2022	FW	(Tunisia) Slim Jendoubi	(Tunisia) CA Bizertin	Free transfer	
24 July 2022	FW	(Algeria) Mohamed El Seddik Benbournane	MC Alger	Free transfer	
29 July 2022	RB	(Algeria) Fateh Achour	USM Alger	Free transfer	
30 July 2022	MF	(Algeria) Kamel Belarbi	USM Alger	Free transfer	
30 July 2022	LB	(Algeria) Chemseddine Nessakh	CR Belouizdad	Free transfer	
31 July 2022	FW	(Algeria) Toufik Addadi	(Tunisia) US Monastir	Free transfer	
31 July 2022	CB	(Algeria) Rabah Aich	RC Relizane	Free transfer	
2 August 2022	FW	(Algeria) Ibrahim Morsli	MC Alger	Loan	
4 August 2022	CB	(Algeria) Ahmed Kerroum	JS Kabylie	Free transfer	
14 August 2022	MF	(Algeria) Redouane Bounoua	WA Tlemcen	Free transfer	

==== Winter ====
Date	Pos	Player	From club	Transfer fee	Source
25 January 2023	RB	(Algeria) Abdelhak Debbari	HB Chelghoum Laïd	Free transfer	
30 January 2023	CB	(Algeria) Abderrahim Hamra	Unattached	Free transfer	
31 January 2023	FW	(Algeria) Amine Ghodbane	CA Batna	Free transfer	

=== Out ===
==== Summer ====
Date	Pos	Player	To club	Transfer fee	Source
30 June 2022	MF	(Algeria) Khalid Dahamni	MC Alger	Free transfer	
10 July 2022	MF	(Algeria) Khathir Baaziz	JS Saoura	Free transfer	
14 July 2022	FW	(Algeria) Mostapha Alili	JS Kabylie	Free transfer	
21 July 2022	MF	(Algeria) Mohamed Bengrina	MC Oran	Free transfer	
23 July 2022	RB	(Algeria) Senoussi Fourloul	MC Oran	Free transfer	
7 August 2022	CB	(Algeria) Abdellah Meddah	SC Mécheria	Free transfer	
11 August 2022	RB	(Algeria) Farouk Benmaarouf	ES Mostaganem	Free transfer	
14 August 2022	LB	(Algeria) Khalfallah Belhaoua	ES Mostaganem	Free transfer	
19 August 2022	RB	(Algeria) Abdellah Meddah	USM Khenchela	Free transfer	
25 August 2022	CB	(Algeria) Houssem Meharzi	Unattached	Free transfer	
25 August 2022	FW	(Algeria) Youcef Narbesla	Unattached	Free transfer	
25 August 2022	FW	(Algeria) Abdelaziz Litt	HB Chelghoum Laïd	Free transfer	
25 August 2022	LB	(Algeria) Abdelkadir Bensalah	Unattached	Free transfer	

==== Winter ====
Date	Pos	Player	To club	Transfer fee	Source
2 February 2023	CB	(Algeria) Rabah Aich	Unattached	Free transfer	

== Competitions ==
=== Overview ===
Competition	Record								Started round	Final position / round	First match	Last match
Competition	G	W	D	L	GF	GA	GD	Win %	Started round	Final position / round	First match	Last match
Ligue 1	30	11	9	10	36	31	+5	36.67	—N/a	7th	26 August 2022	15 July 2023
Algerian Cup	6	4	2	0	9	4	+5	66.67	Round of 64	Winners	25 November 2022	22 June 2023
Total	36	15	11	10	45	35	+10	41.67				

Updated to match played 15 July 2023
Source: Competitions

=== Ligue 1 ===
==== League table ====
Pos	Team	Pld	W	D	L	GF	GA	GD	Pts	Qualification or relegation
5	JS Saoura	30	11	9	10	32	25	+7	42	
6	ES Sétif	30	11	9	10	38	32	+6	42	
7	ASO Chlef	30	11	9	10	36	31	+5	42	Qualification for CAF Confederation Cup (Note: ASO Chlef qualified for the 2023–24 CAF Confederation Cup by winning the 2022–23 Algerian Cup.)
8	USM Khenchela	30	12	6	12	29	29	0	42	
9	Paradou AC	30	11	8	11	35	33	+2	41	

Updated to match(es) played on 15 July 2023. Source: the-sports.org
Rules for classification: 1) points; 2) head-to-head points; 3) head-to-head goal difference; 4) goal difference; 5) total goals; 6) fairplay ranking; 7) playoff.

==== Results summary ====
Overall								Home						Away					
Pld	W	D	L	GF	GA	GD	Pts	W	D	L	GF	GA	GD	W	D	L	GF	GA	GD
30	11	9	10	36	31	+5	42	9	4	2	24	10	+14	2	5	8	12	21	−9

Last updated: 15 July 2023.
Source: Competitive matches

==== Results by round ====
Round	1	2	3	4	5	6	7	8	9	10	11	12	13	14	15	16	17	18	19	20	21	22	23	24	25	26	27	28	29	30
Ground	H	A	H	A	H	A	H	A	H	A	H	H	A	H	A	A	H	A	H	A	H	A	H	A	H	A	A	H	A	H
Result	W	D	D	D	W	L	W	L	D	L	L	D	L	W	L	D	W	D	W	L	D	D	W	W	L	L	L	W	W	W
Position	6	5	6	8	4	5	4	6	6	10	10	11	13	12	13	13	12	12	8	10	12	12	10	10	10	11	13	13	11	7

Updated to match(es) played on 15 July 2023. Source: Competitive matches
A = Away; H = Home; W = Win; D = Draw; L = Loss

==== Matches ====
The league fixtures were announced on 19 July 2022.

26 August 2022 Round 1	ASO Chlef	1–0	JS Kabylie	Relizane
17:00	Jendoubi 89'	Report		Stadium: Tahar Zoughari Stadium; Referee: Abdelmoumen Touabti

3 September 2022 Round 2	HB Chelghoum Laïd	0–0	ASO Chlef	Chelghoum Laïd
16:30		Report		Stadium: 11 December 1961 Stadium; Referee: Mohamed Cherif Bouteraa

10 September 2022 Round 3	ASO Chlef	1–1	Paradou AC	Relizane
16:45	Jendoubi 71' (pen.)	Report	Bouzida 67'	Stadium: Tahar Zoughari Stadium; Referee: Youcef Gamouh

17 September 2022 Round 4	MC Oran	0–0	ASO Chlef	Oran
19:00		Report		Stadium: Ahmed Zabana Stadium; Referee: Lyes Bekouassa

24 September 2022 Round 5	ASO Chlef	4–0	ES Sétif	Relizane
16:30	Aguieb 19'; Addadi 26'; Aliane 62'; Souibaâh 73'	Report		Stadium: Tahar Zoughari Stadium; Referee: Lahlou Benbraham

3 October 2022 Round 6	MC Alger	2–1	ASO Chlef	Dar El Beïda
15:30	Merzougui 18'; Debbih 55'	Report	Addadi 54' (pen.)	Stadium: Omar Benrabah Stadium; Referee: Abdelali Ibrir

14 October 2022 Round 8	US Biskra	2–0	ASO Chlef	Biskra
18:00	Lakhdari 17'; Boukarroum 25' (pen.)	Report		Stadium: 18 February Stadium; Referee: Hamza Bouslimani

21 October 2022 Round 9	ASO Chlef	1–1	RC Arbaâ	Relizane
15:00	Aliane 53'	Report	Toumi 56'	Stadium: Tahar Zoughari Stadium; Referee: Najib Meziani

25 October 2022 Round 7	ASO Chlef	2–1	JS Saoura	Relizane
15:00	Fettouhi 22'; Kerroum 39'	Report	Lahmeri 20' (pen.)	Stadium: Tahar Zoughari Stadium; Referee: Anes Azrine

5 November 2022 Round 10	NC Magra	4–2	ASO Chlef	Magra
15:00	Amrane 8', 13' (pen.); Ziouache 35'; Ghanem 83' (pen.)	Report	Souibaâh 25' (pen.); Kerroum 52'	Stadium: Boucheligue Brothers Stadium; Referee: Bilal Bendjahane

9 November 2022 Round 11	ASO Chlef	0–1	CR Belouizdad	Relizane
15:00		Report	Iwuala 74'	Stadium: Tahar Zoughari Stadium; Referee: Nabil Boukhalfa

29 November 2022 Round 12	ASO Chlef	0–0	MC El Bayadh	Relizane
15:00		Report		Stadium: Tahar Zoughari Stadium; Referee: Lotfi Bekouassa

7 December 2022 Round 13	CS Constantine	3–0	ASO Chlef	Constantine
15:00	Madani 50', 90+2'; Khaldi 68'	Report		Stadium: Ramadane Ben Abdelmalek Stadium; Referee: Hamza Bouslimani

11 December 2022 Round 14	ASO Chlef	2–1	USM Alger	Relizane
15:00	Souibaâh 29', 65'	Report	Chita 38'	Stadium: Tahar Zoughari Stadium; Referee: Akram Mecharia

24 December 2022 Round 15	USM Khenchela	2–0	ASO Chlef	Khenchela
14:30	Bayazid 9', 65'	Report		Stadium: Amar Hamam Stadium; Referee: Lahlou Benbrahem

17 February 2023 Round 17	ASO Chlef	4–0	HB Chelghoum Laïd	Relizane
15:00	Souibaâh 45+2' (pen.); Ghodbane 72', 83'; Aguieb 90+3' (pen.)	Report		Stadium: Tahar Zoughari Stadium; Referee: Elhadj Chihaoui

24 February 2023 Round 18	Paradou AC	2–2	ASO Chlef	Dar El Beïda
15:00	Zerrouki 86'; Douar 90+7'	Report	Souibaâh 65'; Addadi 90+16' (pen.)	Stadium: Omar Benrabah Stadium; Referee: Abdelmoumen Touabti

3 March 2023 Round 16	JS Kabylie	0–0	ASO Chlef	Tizi Ouzou
16:00		Report		Stadium: 1 November 1954 Stadium; Referee: Houssam Benyahia

11 March 2023 Round 19	ASO Chlef	2–1	MC Oran	Chlef
15:00	Souibaâh 36' (pen.); Fettouhi 47'	Report	Naâmani 67'	Stadium: Mohamed Boumezrag Stadium; Referee: Hamza Bouslimani

18 March 2023 Round 20	ES Sétif	1–0	ASO Chlef	Sétif
15:00	Enow 45'	Report		Stadium: 8 May 1945 Stadium; Referee: Mustapha Ghorbal

31 March 2023 Round 21	ASO Chlef	0–0	MC Alger	Chlef
15:45		Report		Stadium: Mohamed Boumezrag Stadium; Referee: Abdellah Benchehida

9 April 2023 Round 22	JS Saoura	1–1	ASO Chlef	Béchar
22:00	Doucene 33'	Report	Souibaâh 23' (pen.)	Stadium: 20 August 1955 Stadium; Referee: Bilal Bendjahene

18 May 2023 Round 23	ASO Chlef	2–1	US Biskra	Chlef
18:00	Ghodbane 49'; Souibaâh 90+1'	Report	Zeghnoun 78'	Stadium: Mohamed Boumezrag Stadium; Referee: Mohamed Bouteraa

31 May 2023 Round 24	RC Arbaâ	0–3	ASO Chlef	Larbaâ
16:00		Report	Belarbi 52'; Addadi 62', 87'	Stadium: Ismaïl Makhlouf Stadium; Referee: Ali Nader

6 June 2023 Round 25	ASO Chlef	0–1	NC Magra	Chlef
16:30		Report	Bourahla 45+1'	Stadium: Mohamed Boumezrag Stadium; Referee: Hamza Bouslimani

1 July 2023 Round 26	CR Belouizdad	1–0	ASO Chlef	Belouizdad
17:00	Wamba 30'	Report		Stadium: 20 August 1955 Stadium; Referee: Bilal Soltani

4 July 2023 Round 27	MC El Bayadh	2–0	ASO Chlef	El Bayadh
17:00	Ghennam 53'; Barkat 67'	Report		Stadium: Zakaria Medjdoub Stadium; Referee: Lyes Bekouassa

7 July 2023 Round 28	ASO Chlef	3–2	CS Constantine	Chlef
17:15	Kerroum 15'; Souibaâh 25', 53'	Report	Abdelhafid 49'; Belmessaoud 84' (pen.)	Stadium: Mohamed Boumezrag Stadium; Referee: Anes Azrine

10 July 2023 Round 29	USM Alger	1–3	ASO Chlef	Rouïba
17:15	Othmani 10'	Report	Debbari 33'; Aliane 53'; Souibaâh 53'	Stadium: Salem Mabrouki Stadium; Referee: Mehadji Tayeb Bouderbali

15 July 2023 Round 30	ASO Chlef	2–0	USM Khenchela	Chlef
20:30	Souibaâh 82' (pen.); Boussaid 84'	Report		Stadium: Mohamed Boumezrag Stadium; Referee: Youcef Tayeb Bouderbali

=== Algerian Cup ===
25 November 2022 Round of 64	E Sour El Ghozlane	1–1 (a.e.t.) (4–5 p)	ASO Chlef	Sour El-Ghozlane
14:00	Hamek 89' (pen.)	Report	Nessakh 86'	Stadium: Mohamed Derradji Stadium; Referee: Mehdi Abid Charef
Note: ASO Chlef Lineups: Alaouchiche, Abada, Nessakh, Kerroum, Aich, Boussaid, Belarbi, Aguieb (Fettouhi, '), Bounoua, Sryer, Souibaâh. (Zenasni, '), (Benbournane, '), (Jendoubi, ')

17 December 2022 Round of 32	RC Arbaâ	1–2	ASO Chlef	Larbaâ
14:00	Toumi 51'	Report	Souibaâh 9' (pen.), 28'	Stadium: Ismaïl Makhlouf Stadium; Referee: Lyes Bekouassa
Note: ASO Chlef Lineups: Alaouchiche, Achour, Nessakh, Kerroum, Arab, Boussaid, Belarbi, Aguieb (Zenasni, 91'), Fettouhi (Abada, 79'), Aliane (Haddouche, 79'), Souibaâh (Jendoubi, 87').

28 April 2023 Round of 16	SKAF Khemis Miliana	0–0 (a.e.t.) (1–3 p)	ASO Chlef	Aïn Defla
15:00		Report		Stadium: Abdelkader Khellal Stadium; Referee: Lotfi Bekouassa
Note: ASO Chlef Lineups: Kacem, Debbari, Nessakh (Hamra, '), Kerroum, Arab, Mohutsiwa, Belarbi (Boussaid, 46'), Addadi, Aguieb (Aliane, 46'), Fettouhi (Ghodbane, '), Souibaâh (Morsli, ').

12 May 2023 Quarter-finals	ASO Chlef	1–0	Olympique Akbou	Chlef
18:00	Addadi 20'	Report		Stadium: Mohamed Boumezrag Stadium; Referee: Lyes Bekouassa
Note: ASO Chlef Lineups: Kacem, Debbari, Nessakh, Arab (Hamra, 58'), Abada, Mohutsiwa (Zenasni, 72'), Boussaid, Addadi, Aliane, Fettouhi (Aguieb, 72'), Souibaâh (Sryer, 69').

26 May 2023 Semi-finals	JS Saoura	1–3	ASO Chlef	Oran
18:00	Hammia 75' (pen.)	Report	Souibaâh 13'; Aliane 46'; Fettouhi 51'	Stadium: Miloud Hadefi Stadium; Referee: Mustapha Ghorbal
Note: ASO Chlef Lineups: Alaouchiche, Debbari, Nessakh, Hamra, Kerroum, Mohutsiwa, Boussaid (Zenasni, 90+2'), Addadi, Fettouhi (Aguieb, 63'), Aliane, Souibaâh (Ghodbane, 84').

22 June 2023 Final	ASO Chlef	2–1 (a.e.t.)	CR Belouizdad	Oran
17:00	Addadi 67'; Morsli 94'	Report	Wamba 8' (pen.)	Stadium: Miloud Hadefi Stadium; Referee: Lahlou Benbraham
Note: ASO Chlef Lineups: Alaouchiche, Debbari, Nessakh, Hamra (Abada, 105'), Kerroum, Mohutsiwa, Boussaid (Zenasni, 110'), Belarbi (Morsli, 61'), Addadi (Achour, 110'), Aliane (Aguieb, 83'), Souibaâh (Jendoubi, 83').

== Squad information ==
=== Playing statistics ===
No.	Pos	Nat	Player	Total		Ligue 1		Algerian Cup	
No.	Pos	Nat	Player	Apps	Goals	Apps	Goals	Apps	Goals
Goalkeepers
1	GK	(Algeria) ALG	Sofiane Kacem	16	0	14	0	2	0
16	GK	(Algeria) ALG	Mohamed Alaouchiche	20	0	16	0	4	0
23	GK	(Algeria) ALG	Youssouf Benhemada	0	0	0	0	0	0
Defenders
3	DF	(Algeria) ALG	Chemseddine Nessakh	27	2	21	1	6	1
12	DF	(Algeria) ALG	Achref Abada	15	0	11	0	4	0
13	DF	(Algeria) ALG	Abderrahim Hamra	18	0	14	0	4	0
22	DF	(Algeria) ALG	Fateh Achour	17	0	15	0	2	0
24	DF	(Algeria) ALG	Mohamed Roufid Arab	24	0	21	0	3	0
25	DF	(Algeria) ALG	Ahmed Kerroum	32	2	27	2	5	0
26	DF	(Algeria) ALG	Abdelhak Debbari	17	1	13	1	4	0
49	DF	(Algeria) ALG	Houssam Kellouche	3	0	3	0	0	0
Midfielders
5	MF	(Algeria) ALG	Ahmida Zenasni	27	0	22	0	5	0
6	MF	(Botswana) BOT	Gape Mohutsiwa	16	0	12	0	4	0
8	MF	(Algeria) ALG	Abdelkader Boussaid	34	1	28	1	6	0
10	MF	(Algeria) ALG	Juba Aguieb	35	2	29	2	6	0
15	MF	(Algeria) ALG	Redouane Bounoua	10	0	9	0	1	0
18	MF	(Algeria) ALG	Toufik Addadi	31	7	27	5	4	2
20	MF	(Algeria) ALG	Kamel Belarbi	23	1	19	1	4	0
Forwards
7	FW	(Algeria) ALG	Nour El Islam Fettouhi	28	3	23	2	5	1
9	FW	(Algeria) ALG	Mohamed El Seddik Benbournane	13	0	12	0	1	0
11	FW	(Algeria) ALG	Yacine Aliane	32	4	27	3	5	1
14	FW	(Algeria) ALG	Ibrahim Morsli	19	1	17	0	2	1
17	FW	(Algeria) ALG	Zakaria Haddouche	14	0	13	0	1	0
19	FW	(Algeria) ALG	Mohamed Souibaâh	33	16	27	13	6	3
21	FW	(Algeria) ALG	Amine Ghodbane	12	3	10	3	2	0
27	FW	(Tunisia) TUN	Slim Jendoubi	22	2	19	2	3	0
77	FW	(Algeria) ALG	Abdelghani Sryer	7	0	5	0	2	0
Players transferred out during the season
4	DF	(Algeria) ALG	Rabah Aich	2	0	1	0	1	0

Last updated: 15 July 2023
Source: soccerway.com

=== Goalscorers ===
As of 15 July 2023

Includes all competitive matches. The list is sorted alphabetically by surname when total goals are equal.

No.	Nat.	Player	Pos.	L 1	AC	TOTAL
19	(Algeria)	Mohamed Souibaâh	FW	13	3	16
18	(Algeria)	Toufik Addadi	MF	5	2	7
11	(Algeria)	Yacine Aliane	FW	3	1	4
21	(Algeria)	Amine Ghodbane	FW	3	0	3
7	(Algeria)	Nour El Islam Fettouhi	FW	2	1	3
25	(Algeria)	Ahmed Kerroum	DF	3	0	3
27	(Tunisia)	Slim Jendoubi	FW	2	0	2
10	(Algeria)	Juba Aguieb	MF	2	0	2
3	(Algeria)	Chemseddine Nessakh	DF	0	1	1
20	(Algeria)	Kamel Belarbi	MF	1	0	1
14	(Algeria)	Ibrahim Morsli	FW	0	1	1
26	(Algeria)	Abdelhak Debbari	DF	1	0	1
8	(Algeria)	Abdelkader Boussaid	MF	1	0	1
Own Goals				0	0	0
Totals				36	9	45
