= 2026–27 ASO Chlef season =

ASO Chlef
2026–27 season
- President: Abdelkrim Medouar
- Head coach: Abdelhaq Belaid (until 24 October 2026); Mounir Zeghdoud (from 17 November 2026)
- Stadium: Mohamed Boumezrag Stadium
- Ligue 1: 13th
- Algerian Cup: Round of 64

The 2026–27 season, is ASO Chlef's 36th season season and the club's 8th consecutive season in the top flight of Algerian football. In addition to the domestic league, ASO Chlef are participating in this season's editions of the Algerian Cup.

== Squad list ==
Players and squad numbers last updated on 31 August 2026.
Note: Flags indicate national team as has been defined under FIFA eligibility rules. Players may hold more than one non-FIFA nationality.

No.	Nat.	Name	Position	Date of Birth (Age)	Signed from
Goalkeepers
1	(Algeria)	Ali Tergou	GK	25 April 2007 (aged 18)	(Algeria) Reserve team
16	(Algeria)	Abderrahmane Medjadel	GK	1 July 1998 (aged 28)	(Algeria) MSP Batna
30	(Algeria)	Chamseddine Rahmani	GK	15 September 1990 (aged 35)	Unattached
Defenders
3	(Algeria)	Oussama Benatia	RB	14 August 2005 (aged 21)	(Algeria) JS Kabylie
4	(Algeria)	Zakaria Abdelli	CB	20 April 2004 (aged 22)	(Algeria) MC Alger
13	(Algeria)	Saïd Lamrani	CB	1 September 1999 (aged 26)	(Algeria) US Chaouia
19	(Algeria)	Abdeldjalil Bessalhi	CB	1 January 2007 (aged 19)	(Algeria) MT El Bordj
20	(Algeria)	Belkacem Brahimi	LB	20 January 1994 (aged 32)	(Algeria) ES Sétif
21	(Algeria)	Amir Laidouni	RB	20 September 1999 (aged 26)	(Algeria) USM Annaba
24	(Algeria)	Fouad Rahmani	CB	3 January 2002 (aged 24)	(Algeria) MB Rouissat
26	(Algeria)	Abdelhak Debbari	RB	6 January 1993 (aged 33)	(Algeria) HB Chelghoum Laïd
28	(Algeria)	Abderrahim Hamdani	LB	2 December 1995 (aged 30)	(Algeria) JS El Biar
Midfielders
6	(Algeria)	Alaeddine Belaribi	AM	17 October 1997 (aged 28)	(Algeria) MB Rouissat
8	(Algeria)	Mohamed Abboub	DM	27 May 2003 (aged 23)	(Algeria) Reserve team
10	(Algeria)	Imadeddine Larbi	AM	31 July 2002 (aged 24)	(Algeria) GC Mascara
12	(Niger)	Ismael Moussa	DM	1 January 2002 (aged 24)	(Spain) Granada CF
14	(Ivory Coast)	Ousmane Diakité	AM	31 December 1999 (aged 26)	(Ivory Coast) Inova SCA
15	(Algeria)	Chemseddine Bekkouche	AM	13 March 2001 (aged 25)	(Spain) Atlético Levante UD
17	(Algeria)	Samir Aiboud	CM	11 February 1993 (aged 33)	(Algeria) USM Khenchela
18	(Algeria)	Djamel Belalem	DM	12 August 1993 (aged 33)	(Algeria) MC El Bayadh
29	(Algeria)	Dahmane Bounoua	AM	20 March 2006 (aged 20)	(Algeria) Reserve team
Forwards
2	(Algeria)	Anis Benchouya	ST	6 September 2002 (aged 23)	(Algeria) Reserve team
7	(Algeria)	Zoubir Motrani	ST	24 July 1995 (aged 31)	(Algeria) ES Mostaganem
11	(Algeria)	Yasser Belaribi	LW	22 January 1999 (aged 27)	Unattached
22	(Liberia)	Edward Ledlum	LW	15 June 1999 (aged 27)	(Liberia) Paynesville FC
25	(Togo)	Kokou Avotor	ST	17 November 2000 (aged 25)	(Togo) AS OTR Lomé
27	(Algeria)	Aissa Feddal	RW	29 May 2005 (aged 21)	(Algeria) Reserve team

== Transfers ==
=== In ===
==== Summer ====
Date	Pos	Player	Moving from	Fee	Source
4 July 2026	CB	(Algeria) Saïd Lamrani	US Chaouia	Free transfer	
4 July 2026	RB	(Algeria) Amir Laidouni	USM Annaba	Free transfer	
4 July 2026	AM	(Algeria) Alaeddine Belaribi	MB Rouissat	Free transfer	
4 July 2026	ST	(Algeria) Zoubir Motrani	ES Mostaganem	Free transfer	
7 July 2026	LB	(Algeria) Abderrahim Hamdani	JS El Biar	Free transfer	
8 July 2026	CB	(Algeria) Abdeldjalil Bessalhi	MT El Bordj	Free transfer	
4 August 2026	AM	(Ivory Coast) Ousmane Diakité	(Ivory Coast) Inova SCA	Free transfer	
24 August 2026	RB	(Algeria) Oussama Benatia	JS Kabylie	Free transfer	

=== Out ===
==== Summer ====
Date	Pos	Player	Moving to	Fee	Source
10 June 2026	CM	(Algeria) Ibrahim Farhi Benhalima	Olympique Akbou	Free transfer	
9 July 2026	CM	(Algeria) Dalil Hassen Khodja	ES Sétif	Free transfer	
13 July 2026	LW	(Algeria) Aymen Kouadri Habbaz	ASM Oran	Free transfer	
19 August 2026	RB	(Algeria) Ayoub Sadahine	JS Kabylie	Undisclosed	

=== New contracts ===
No.	Pos	Player	Contract length	Contract end	Date	Source
20	LB	Belkacem Brahimi	2 years	2028	4 July 2026	

== Competitions ==
=== Overview ===
Competition	Record								Started round	Final position / round	First match	Last match
Competition	G	W	D	L	GF	GA	GD	Win %	Started round	Final position / round	First match	Last match
Ligue 1	10	1	5	4	9	13	−4	10.00	—N/a	To be confirmed	5 September 2026	In Progress
Algerian Cup	0	0	0	0	0	0	+0	—	Round of 64	To be confirmed	December 2026	In Progress
Total	10	1	5	4	9	13	−4	10.00				

Updated to match played 20 November 2026
Source: Competitions

=== Ligue 1 ===
==== League table ====
Pos	Team	Pld	W	D	L	GF	GA	GD	Pts	Qualification or relegation
11	CS Constantine	10	3	1	6	12	18	−6	10	
12	ES Ben Aknoun	9	1	5	3	8	10	−2	8	
13	ASO Chlef	10	1	5	4	9	13	−4	8	
14	JS Saoura	9	1	4	4	2	8	−6	7	Relegation to Algerian League 2
15	USM Khenchela	10	1	4	5	5	12	−7	7	Relegation to Algerian League 2

Updated to match(es) played on 20 November 2026. Source: lfp.dz
Rules for classification: 1) Points; 2) Head-to-head points; 3) Head-to-head goal difference; 4) First half goal difference; 5) First half total goals; 6) Fairplay ranking; 7) Playoff.

==== Results summary ====
Overall								Home						Away					
Pld	W	D	L	GF	GA	GD	Pts	W	D	L	GF	GA	GD	W	D	L	GF	GA	GD
10	1	5	4	9	13	−4	8	1	3	2	8	8	0	0	2	2	1	5	−4

Last updated: 20 November 2026.
Source: Competitive matches

==== Results by round ====
Round	1	2	3	4	5	6	7	8	9	10	11	12	13	14	15	16	17	18	19	20	21	22	23	24	25	26	27	28	29	30
Ground	H	A	H	A	H	A	H	H	A	H	A	H	A	H	A	A	H	A	H	A	H	A	A	H	A	H	A	H	A	H
Result	D	L	L	L	D	D	D	L	D	W																				
Position	5																													

Updated to match(es) played on 20 November 2026. Source: Competitive matches
A = Away; H = Home; W = Win; D = Draw; L = Loss

==== Matches ====
The league fixtures were announced on 3 August 2026.

All times are local, WAT (UTC+1).

Win Draw Loss Postponed

5 September 2026 Round 1	ASO Chlef	3–3	CR Belouizdad	Chlef
21:00	Motrani 1', 6'; Bekkouche 71'	Flashscore; LFP	Kaâssis 13'; Debbari 20' (o.g.); Etouga 42'	Stadium: Mohamed Boumezrag Stadium; Referee: Abdennour Khalfallah

12 September 2026 Round 2	CS Constantine	3–0	ASO Chlef	Constantine
21:00	Dib 30'; Agbagno 51'; Chaban 84'	Flashscore; LFP		Stadium: Chahid Hamlaoui Stadium; Referee: Tahar Boudjemaa

18 September 2026 Round 3	ASO Chlef	0–1	MC Oran	Chlef
21:00		Flashscore; LFP	Saadi 75'	Stadium: Mohamed Boumezrag Stadium; Referee: Anes Azrine

9 October 2026 Round 4	JS Kabylie	1–0	ASO Chlef	Tizi Ouzou
18:00	Mahious 12' (pen.)	Flashscore; LFP		Stadium: Hocine Aït Ahmed Stadium; Referee: Mehdi Oukil

13 October 2026 Round 5	ASO Chlef	1–1	MC Alger	Chlef
18:00	Ferhat 14'	Flashscore; LFP	Diakité 61'	Stadium: Mohamed Boumezrag Stadium; Referee: Rafiq Aouina

18 October 2026 Round 6	CR Témouchent	1–1	ASO Chlef	Aïn Témouchent
17:45	Hedroug 53'	Flashscore; LFP	Diakité 68'	Stadium: Omar Oucief Stadium; Referee: Fateh Harkat

24 October 2026 Round 7	ASO Chlef	–	MB Rouissat	Chlef
17:00	Hamdani 36'	Flashscore; LFP	Amokrane 90+4'	Stadium: Mohamed Boumezrag Stadium; Referee: Lotfi Bekouassa

30 October 2026 Round 8	ASO Chlef	1–2	ES Sétif	Chlef
17:45	Motrani 45'	Flashscore; LFP	Benayad 3'; Bouchagoura 74'	Stadium: Mohamed Boumezrag Stadium; Referee: Mustapha Ghorbal

8 November 2026 Round 9	US Biskra	0–0	ASO Chlef	Zeribet El Oued
14:00		Flashscore; LFP		Stadium: Bouhafs Chabi Stadium; Referee: Haitham Ghouti

20 November 2026 Round 10	ASO Chlef	2–0	USM Khenchela	Chlef
17:00	Feddal 75'; Debbari 88'	Flashscore; LFP		Stadium: Mohamed Boumezrag Stadium; Referee: Hichem Benokba

30 November 2026 Round 11	JS El Biar	–	ASO Chlef	Dar El Beïda
14:00		Flashscore; LFP		Stadium: Omar Benrabah Stadium

Round 12	ASO Chlef	–	Olympique Akbou	Chlef
:		Flashscore; LFP		Stadium: Mohamed Boumezrag Stadium

Round 13	USM Alger	–	ASO Chlef	Algiers
:		Flashscore; LFP		Stadium: Stade du 5 Juillet

Round 14	ASO Chlef	–	JS Saoura	Chlef
:		Flashscore; LFP		Stadium: Mohamed Boumezrag Stadium

Round 15	ES Ben Aknoun	–	ASO Chlef	Belouizdad
:		Flashscore; LFP		Stadium: 20 August 1955 Stadium

Round 16	CR Belouizdad	–	ASO Chlef	Baraki
:		Flashscore; LFP		Stadium: Nelson Mandela Stadium

Round 17	ASO Chlef	–	CS Constantine	Chlef
:		Flashscore; LFP		Stadium: Mohamed Boumezrag Stadium

Round 18	MC Oran	–	ASO Chlef	Bir El Djir
:		Flashscore; LFP		Stadium: Miloud Hadefi Stadium

Round 19	ASO Chlef	–	JS Kabylie	Chlef
:		Flashscore; LFP		Stadium: Mohamed Boumezrag Stadium

Round 20	MC Alger	–	ASO Chlef	Douéra
:		Flashscore; LFP		Stadium: Ali La Pointe Stadium

Round 21	ASO Chlef	–	CR Témouchent	Chlef
:		Flashscore; LFP		Stadium: Mohamed Boumezrag Stadium

Round 22	MB Rouissat	–	ASO Chlef	Ouargla
:		Flashscore; LFP		Stadium: 18 February Stadium

Round 23	ES Sétif	–	ASO Chlef	Sétif
:		Flashscore; LFP		Stadium: 8 May 1945 Stadium

Round 24	ASO Chlef	–	US Biskra	Chlef
:		Flashscore; LFP		Stadium: Mohamed Boumezrag Stadium

Round 25	USM Khenchela	–	ASO Chlef	Khenchela
:		Flashscore; LFP		Stadium: Amar Hamam Stadium

Round 26	ASO Chlef	–	JS El Biar	Chlef
:		Flashscore; LFP		Stadium: Mohamed Boumezrag Stadium

Round 27	Olympique Akbou	–	ASO Chlef	Akbou
:		Flashscore; LFP		Stadium: Martyrs Stadium

Round 28	ASO Chlef	–	USM Alger	Chlef
:		Flashscore; LFP		Stadium: Mohamed Boumezrag Stadium

Round 29	JS Saoura	–	ASO Chlef	Béchar
:		Flashscore; LFP		Stadium: 20 August 1955 Stadium

Round 30	ASO Chlef	–	ES Ben Aknoun	Chlef
:		Flashscore; LFP		Stadium: Mohamed Boumezrag Stadium

=== Algerian Cup ===
December 2026 Round of 64	–
:

== Squad information ==
=== Appearances and goals ===
As of 20 November 2026

No.	Pos	Player	Nat	Ligue 1			Algerian Cup			Total		
No.	Pos	Player	Nat	App	St	G	App	St	G	App	St	G
Goalkeepers
1	GK	Ali Tergou	(Algeria)	0	0	0	0	0	0	0	0	0
16	GK	Abderrahmane Medjadel	(Algeria)	2	2	0	0	0	0	0	0	0
30	GK	Chamseddine Rahmani	(Algeria)	8	8	0	0	0	0	0	0	0
Defenders
3	RB	Oussama Benatia	(Algeria)	8	7	0	0	0	0	0	0	0
4	CB	Zakaria Abdelli	(Algeria)	2	0	0	0	0	0	0	0	0
13	CB	Saïd Lamrani	(Algeria)	10	10	0	0	0	0	0	0	0
19	CB	Abdeldjalil Bessalhi	(Algeria)	0	0	0	0	0	0	0	0	0
20	LB	Belkacem Brahimi	(Algeria)	5	4	0	0	0	0	0	0	0
21	RB	Amir Laidouni	(Algeria)	4	3	0	0	0	0	0	0	0
24	CB	Fouad Rahmani	(Algeria)	0	0	0	0	0	0	0	0	0
26	RB	Abdelhak Debbari	(Algeria)	10	10	1	0	0	0	0	0	0
28	LB	Abderrahim Hamdani	(Algeria)	9	6	1	0	0	0	0	0	0
Midfielders
6	AM	Alaeddine Belaribi	(Algeria)	9	7	0	0	0	0	0	0	0
8	DM	Mohamed Abboub	(Algeria)	3	2	0	0	0	0	0	0	0
10	AM	Imadeddine Larbi	(Algeria)	2	1	0	0	0	0	0	0	0
12	DM	Ismael Moussa	(Niger)	10	9	0	0	0	0	0	0	0
14	AM	Ousmane Diakité	(Ivory Coast)	9	8	2	0	0	0	0	0	0
17	CM	Samir Aiboud	(Algeria)	4	0	0	0	0	0	0	0	0
18	DM	Djamel Belalem	(Algeria)	5	3	0	0	0	0	0	0	0
29	AM	Dahmane Bounoua	(Algeria)	0	0	0	0	0	0	0	0	0
Forwards
2	ST	Anis Elhadj Benchouya	(Algeria)	9	5	0	0	0	0	0	0	0
7	ST	Zoubir Motrani	(Algeria)	7	6	3	0	0	0	0	0	0
11	RW	Yasser Belaribi	(Algeria)	7	1	0	0	0	0	0	0	0
15	LW	Chemseddine Bekkouche	(Algeria)	9	8	1	0	0	0	0	0	0
22	LW	Edward Ledlum	(Liberia)	10	9	0	0	0	0	0	0	0
25	ST	Kokou Avotor	(Togo)	8	1	0	0	0	0	0	0	0
27	RW	Aissa Feddal	(Algeria)	5	0	1	0	0	0	0	0	0
Total				10		9	0		0	0		0

Last updated: 20 November 2026
Source: soccerway.com

=== Goalscorers ===
As of 20 November 2026

Includes all competitive matches.

No.	Nat.	Player	Pos.	L1	AC	TOTAL
7	(Algeria)	Zoubir Motrani	ST	3	0	3
14	(Ivory Coast)	Ousmane Diakité	AM	2	0	2
15	(Algeria)	Chemseddine Bekkouche	LW	1	0	1
28	(Algeria)	Abderrahim Hamdani	LB	1	0	1
26	(Algeria)	Abdelhak Debbari	RB	1	0	1
27	(Algeria)	Aissa Feddal	RW	1	0	1
Own Goals				0	0	0
Totals				9	0	9

=== Clean sheets ===
As of 20 November 2026

Includes all competitive matches.

					Clean sheets		
No.	Nat	Name	GP	GA	L1	AC	Total
1	(Algeria)	Ali Tergou	0	0	0	0	0
16	(Algeria)	Abderrahmane Medjadel	2	6	0	0	0
30	(Algeria)	Chamseddine Rahmani	8	7	2	0	2
		TOTALS		13	2	0	2
