= 2026–27 Olympique Akbou season =

Olympique Akbou
2026–27 season
- Owner: Soummam
- President: Karim Takka
- Head coach: Abdelkader Amrani (from 13 June 2026)
- Stadium: Martyrs Stadium
- Ligue 1: 5th
- Algerian Cup: Round of 64

The 2026–27 season, is Olympique Akbou's 3rd season in the top flight of Algerian football. In addition to the domestic league, Olympique Akbou are participating in this season's editions of the Algerian Cup.

== Squad list ==
Players and squad numbers last updated on 31 August 2026.
Note: Flags indicate national team as has been defined under FIFA eligibility rules. Players may hold more than one non-FIFA nationality.

No.	Nat.	Name	Position	Date of Birth (Age)	Signed from
Goalkeepers
1	(Algeria)	Rayane Yesli	GK	12 October 1999 (aged 26)	(Canada) HFX Wanderers
16	(Algeria)	Benaouda Klileche	GK	20 November 1999 (aged 26)	(Algeria) SC Mecheria
30	(Algeria)	Ahmed Alili	GK	5 February 2005 (aged 21)	(Algeria) Paradou AC
Defenders
2	(Mauritania)	Khadim Diaw	LB	7 July 1998 (aged 28)	(Libya) Al-Nasr SC
3	(Algeria)	Nassim Mekidèche	CB	3 April 2000 (aged 26)	(Canada) HFX Wanderers
14	(Algeria)	Hamza Mouali	LB	16 January 1998 (aged 28)	(Algeria) JS Kabylie
17	(Algeria)	Abdelkader Belharrane	RB	11 August 2000 (aged 26)	(Algeria) MC Oran
21	(Algeria)	Walid Bencherifa	LB	6 November 1988 (aged 37)	(Morocco) IR Tangier
22	(Senegal)	Moussa Sogué	CB	23 January 2001 (aged 25)	(Senegal) US Ouakam
23	(Algeria)	Nasreddine Zaalani	CB	26 July 1992 (aged 34)	(Algeria) JS Saoura
24	(Algeria)	Riad Boutiba	CB	10 January 2006 (aged 20)	(Algeria) Youth team
27	(Algeria)	Abdelkader Essahli	CB	1 January 2006 (aged 20)	(Algeria) CR Belouizdad
Midfielders
4	(Algeria)	Ali Amriche	DM	8 December 1998 (aged 27)	(Algeria) JS Kabylie
5	(Algeria)	Abdelkader Boutiche	DM	26 October 1996 (aged 29)	(Algeria) JS Saoura
6	(Algeria)	Louanes Zidi	DM	19 September 2001 (aged 24)	(Algeria) Reserve team
8	(Algeria)	Ibrahim Farhi Benhalima	CM	16 April 1997 (aged 29)	(Algeria) ASO Chlef
18	(Algeria)	Hicham Messiad	AM	21 April 1999 (aged 27)	(Algeria) Paradou AC
19	(Algeria)	Feth-Allah Tahar	AM	22 January 1994 (aged 32)	(Algeria) CS Constantine
20	(Algeria)	Toufik Addadi	CM	7 October 1990 (aged 35)	(Algeria) ES Mostaganem
28	(Senegal)	Bonaventure Fonseca	DM	10 January 2001 (aged 25)	(Tunisia) CA Bizertin
Forwards
7	(Algeria)	Ramdane Hitala	ST	8 February 1995 (aged 31)	(Algeria) ES Mostaganem
9	(Niger)	Ibrahim Harouna	ST	1 January 2003 (aged 23)	(Iraq) Al-Najaf SC
10	(Algeria)	Walid Zamoum	LW	10 June 1997 (aged 29)	(Algeria) ES Sétif
11	(Algeria)	Khaled Bousseliou	LW	3 October 1997 (aged 28)	(Libya) Al Ta'awon SC
12	(Algeria)	M'hend Sediri	RW	15 March 1996 (aged 30)	(Algeria) MC El Bayadh
25	(Algeria)	Mehdi Ouamri	ST	2 May 1999 (aged 27)	(South Africa) TS Galaxy
26	(Algeria)	Ghilas Belgacem	ST	10 April 2005 (aged 21)	(Algeria) CR Belouizdad
29	(Algeria)	Seyfeddine Bitam	ST	6 June 2006 (aged 20)	(Algeria) Youth team

== Transfers ==
=== In ===
==== Summer ====
Date	Pos	Player	Moving from	Fee	Source
7 June 2026	GK	(Algeria) Hatem Bencheikh El Fegoun	ES Sétif	Loan return	
9 June 2026	DM	(Algeria) Abdelkader Boutiche	JS Saoura	Free transfer	
10 June 2026	LW	(Algeria) Khaled Bousseliou	(Libya) Al Ta'awon SC	Free transfer	
10 June 2026	CM	(Algeria) Ibrahim Farhi Benhalima	ASO Chlef	Free transfer	
10 June 2026	RB	(Algeria) Abdelkader Belharrane	MC Oran	Free transfer	
16 June 2026	CB	(Algeria) Nasreddine Zaalani	JS Saoura	Free transfer	
16 June 2026	ST	(Algeria) Seyfeddine Bitam	Youth team	First Professional Contract	
17 June 2026	CB	(Algeria) Riad Boutiba	Youth team	First Professional Contract	
11 July 2026	LB	(Mauritania) Khadim Diaw	(Libya) Al-Nasr SC	Free transfer	
14 July 2026	LB	(Algeria) Hamza Mouali	JS Kabylie	Undisclosed	
20 July 2026	AM	(Algeria) Feth-Allah Tahar	CS Constantine	Free transfer	
25 July 2026	CB	(Algeria) Abdelkader Essahli	CR Belouizdad	Free transfer	
28 July 2026	CB	(Senegal) Moussa Sogué	(Senegal) US Ouakam	Free transfer	
28 July 2026	DM	(Senegal) Bonaventure Fonseca	(Tunisia) CA Bizertin	Free transfer	
1 August 2026	ST	(Niger) Ibrahim Harouna	(Iraq) Al-Najaf SC	Free transfer	
26 August 2026	ST	(Algeria) Mehdi Ouamri	(South Africa) TS Galaxy	Free transfer	

=== Out ===
==== Summer ====
Date	Pos	Player	Moving to	Fee	Source
15 June 2026	CB	(Algeria) Slimane Bouteldja	ES Sétif	Free transfer	
23 June 2026	RW	(Algeria) Rezki Hamroune	Unattached	Free transfer (Released)	
26 June 2026	ST	(Algeria) Oussama Darfalou	Unattached	Free transfer (Released)	
26 June 2026	LW	(Algeria) Nadjib Berrabeh	Unattached	Free transfer (Released)	
27 June 2026	LB	(Algeria) Yasser Chelfaoui	CR Belouizdad	Free transfer	
7 July 2026	CM	(Algeria) Merouane Mehdaoui	MC Alger	Undisclosed	
13 July 2026	DM	(Algeria) Dhirar Bensaadallah	USM Alger	Free transfer	
13 July 2026	RB	(Algeria) Bilal Boukaroum	ES Ben Aknoun	Free transfer	
19 July 2026	GK	(Algeria) Hatem Bencheikh El Fegoun	USM Khenchela	Free transfer	
25 July 2026	ST	(Tunisia) Hamdi Labidi	Unattached	Free transfer (Released)	
3 August 2026	ST	(Algeria) Amine Gherbi	USM Alger	Undisclosed	
4 August 2026	CB	(Algeria) Abderrahmane Sabri	Unattached	Free transfer (Released)	
4 August 2026	LB	(Algeria) Ahmed Alla	Unattached	Free transfer (Released)	
4 August 2026	DM	(Mali) Aly Desse Sissoko	Unattached	End of contract	

=== New contracts ===
No.	Pos	Player	Contract length	Contract end	Date	Source
20	CM	Toufik Addadi	1 year	2027	11 June 2026	

== Competitions ==
=== Overview ===
Competition	Record								Started round	Final position / round	First match	Last match
Competition	G	W	D	L	GF	GA	GD	Win %	Started round	Final position / round	First match	Last match
Ligue 1	9	4	3	2	10	6	+4	44.44	—N/a	To be confirmed	3 September 2026	In Progress
Algerian Cup	0	0	0	0	0	0	+0	—	Round of 64	To be confirmed	December 2026	In Progress
Total	9	4	3	2	10	6	+4	44.44				

Updated to match played 19 November 2026
Source: Competitions

=== Ligue 1 ===
==== League table ====
Pos	Team	Pld	W	D	L	GF	GA	GD	Pts	Qualification or relegation
3	MB Rouissat	10	5	3	2	10	6	+4	18	Qualification for CAF Confederation Cup
4	MC Alger	8	5	1	2	9	3	+6	16	
5	Olympique Akbou	9	4	3	2	10	6	+4	15	
6	MC Oran	8	4	3	1	5	2	+3	15	
7	USM Alger	8	4	2	2	10	7	+3	14	

Updated to match(es) played on 19 November 2026. Source: lfp.dz
Rules for classification: 1) Points; 2) Head-to-head points; 3) Head-to-head goal difference; 4) First half goal difference; 5) First half total goals; 6) Fairplay ranking; 7) Playoff.

==== Results summary ====
Overall								Home						Away					
Pld	W	D	L	GF	GA	GD	Pts	W	D	L	GF	GA	GD	W	D	L	GF	GA	GD
9	4	3	2	10	6	+4	15	2	1	1	7	4	+3	2	2	1	3	2	+1

Last updated: 19 November 2026.
Source: Competitive matches

==== Results by round ====
Round	1	2	3	4	5	6	7	8	9	10	11	12	13	14	15	16	17	18	19	20	21	22	23	24	25	26	27	28	29	30
Ground	A	A	H	A	H	A	H	A	H	A	H	A	H	A	H	H	H	A	H	A	H	A	H	A	H	A	H	A	H	A
Result	W	L	L	D	W		W	D	D	W																				
Position																														

Updated to match(es) played on 19 November 2026. Source: Competitive matches
A = Away; H = Home; W = Win; D = Draw; L = Loss

==== Matches ====
The league fixtures were announced on 3 August 2026.

All times are local, WAT (UTC+1).

Win Draw Loss Postponed

3 September 2026 Round 1	JS El Biar	0–2	Olympique Akbou	Blida
21:00		Flashscore; LFP	Addadi 57' (pen.); Harouna 90+3'	Stadium: Mustapha Tchaker Stadium; Referee: Tayeb Benyebka

12 September 2026 Round 2	MB Rouissat	2–0	Olympique Akbou	Ouargla
19:00	Midoune 56'; Amokrane 90+5'	Flashscore; LFP		Stadium: 18 February Stadium; Referee: Ayoub Belhachemi

19 September 2026 Round 3	Olympique Akbou	2–3	USM Alger	Akbou
16:00	Boutiche 37' (pen.); Hitala 60'	Flashscore; LFP	Ramdaoui 21'; Farhi 48' (o.g.); Kamagaté 78'	Stadium: Martyrs Stadium; Referee: Alaa Bouab

8 October 2026 Round 4	JS Saoura	0–0	Olympique Akbou	Béchar
18:00		Flashscore; LFP		Stadium: 20 August 1955 Stadium; Referee: Youcef Taieb Bouderbal

16 October 2026 Round 5	Olympique Akbou	2–1	ES Ben Aknoun	Akbou
15:30	Zaalani 55'; Messiad 58'	Flashscore; LFP	Tamimi 4'	Stadium: Martyrs Stadium; Referee: Tahar Boudjemaa

23 October 2026 Round 7	Olympique Akbou	3–0	CS Constantine	Akbou
15:15	Hitala 13'; Zamoum 47'; Tahar 56'	Flashscore; LFP		Stadium: Martyrs Stadium; Referee: Tayeb Benyebka

30 October 2026 Round 8	MC Oran	0–0	Olympique Akbou	Bir El Djir
20:00		Flashscore; LFP		Stadium: Miloud Hadefi Stadium; Referee: Mehdi Oukil

7 November 2026 Round 9	Olympique Akbou	0–0	JS Kabylie	Akbou
14:00		Flashscore; LFP		Stadium: Martyrs Stadium; Referee: Akram Mechairia

19 November 2026 Round 10	MC Alger	0–1	Olympique Akbou	Douéra
17:45		Flashscore; LFP	Sediri 21'	Stadium: Ali La Pointe Stadium; Referee: Ayoub Belhachemi

1 December 2026 Round 11	Olympique Akbou	–	CR Témouchent	Akbou
14:00		Flashscore; LFP		Stadium: Martyrs Stadium

Round 6	CR Belouizdad	–	Olympique Akbou	Baraki
:		Flashscore; LFP		Stadium: Nelson Mandela Stadium

Round 12	ASO Chlef	–	Olympique Akbou	Chlef
:		Flashscore; LFP		Stadium: Mohamed Boumezrag Stadium

Round 13	Olympique Akbou	–	ES Sétif	Akbou
:		Flashscore; LFP		Stadium: Martyrs Stadium

Round 14	US Biskra	–	Olympique Akbou	Zeribet El Oued
:		Flashscore; LFP		Stadium: Bouhafs Chabi Stadium

Round 15	Olympique Akbou	–	USM Khenchela	Akbou
:		Flashscore; LFP		Stadium: Martyrs Stadium

Round 16	Olympique Akbou	–	JS El Biar	Akbou
:		Flashscore; LFP		Stadium: Martyrs Stadium

Round 17	Olympique Akbou	–	MB Rouissat	Akbou
:		Flashscore; LFP		Stadium: Martyrs Stadium

Round 18	USM Alger	–	Olympique Akbou	Algiers
:		Flashscore; LFP		Stadium: Stade du 5 Juillet

Round 19	Olympique Akbou	–	JS Saoura	Akbou
:		Flashscore; LFP		Stadium: Martyrs Stadium

Round 20	ES Ben Aknoun	–	Olympique Akbou	Belouizdad
:		Flashscore; LFP		Stadium: 20 August 1955 Stadium

Round 21	Olympique Akbou	–	CR Belouizdad	Akbou
:		Flashscore; LFP		Stadium: Martyrs Stadium

Round 22	CS Constantine	–	Olympique Akbou	Constantine
:		Flashscore; LFP		Stadium: Chahid Hamlaoui Stadium

Round 23	Olympique Akbou	–	MC Oran	Akbou
:		Flashscore; LFP		Stadium: Martyrs Stadium

Round 24	JS Kabylie	–	Olympique Akbou	Tizi Ouzou
:		Flashscore; LFP		Stadium: Hocine Aït Ahmed Stadium

Round 25	Olympique Akbou	–	MC Alger	Akbou
:		Flashscore; LFP		Stadium: Martyrs Stadium

Round 26	CR Témouchent	–	Olympique Akbou	Aïn Témouchent
:		Flashscore; LFP		Stadium: Omar Oucief Stadium

Round 27	Olympique Akbou	–	ASO Chlef	Akbou
:		Flashscore; LFP		Stadium: Martyrs Stadium

Round 28	ES Sétif	–	Olympique Akbou	Sétif
:		Flashscore; LFP		Stadium: 8 May 1945 Stadium

Round 29	Olympique Akbou	–	US Biskra	Akbou
:		Flashscore; LFP		Stadium: Martyrs Stadium

Round 30	USM Khenchela	–	Olympique Akbou	Khenchela
:		Flashscore; LFP		Stadium: Amar Hamam Stadium

=== Algerian Cup ===
December 2026 Round of 64	–
:

== Squad information ==
=== Appearances and goals ===
As of 19 November 2026

No.	Pos	Player	Nat	Ligue 1			Algerian Cup			Total		
No.	Pos	Player	Nat	App	St	G	App	St	G	App	St	G
Goalkeepers
1	GK	Rayane Yesli	(Algeria)	9	9	0	0	0	0	0	0	0
16	GK	Benaouda Klileche	(Algeria)	0	0	0	0	0	0	0	0	0
30	GK	Ahmed Alili	(Algeria)	0	0	0	0	0	0	0	0	0
Defenders
2	LB	Khadim Diaw	(Mauritania)	6	3	0	0	0	0	0	0	0
3	CB	Nassim Mekidèche	(Algeria)	5	5	0	0	0	0	0	0	0
14	LB	Hamza Mouali	(Algeria)	6	5	0	0	0	0	0	0	0
17	RB	Abdelkader Belharrane	(Algeria)	9	9	0	0	0	0	0	0	0
21	LB	Walid Bencherifa	(Algeria)	6	5	0	0	0	0	0	0	0
22	CB	Moussa Sogué	(Senegal)	1	0	0	0	0	0	0	0	0
23	CB	Nasreddine Zaalani	(Algeria)	9	9	1	0	0	0	0	0	0
24	CB	Riad Boutiba	(Algeria)	0	0	0	0	0	0	0	0	0
27	CB	Abdelkader Essahli	(Algeria)	0	0	0	0	0	0	0	0	0
Midfielders
4	DM	Ali Amriche	(Algeria)	0	0	0	0	0	0	0	0	0
5	DM	Abdelkader Boutiche	(Algeria)	9	9	1	0	0	0	0	0	0
6	DM	Louanes Zidi	(Algeria)	0	0	0	0	0	0	0	0	0
8	CM	Ibrahim Farhi Benhalima	(Algeria)	4	2	0	0	0	0	0	0	0
18	AM	Hicham Messiad	(Algeria)	8	5	1	0	0	0	0	0	0
19	AM	Feth-Allah Tahar	(Algeria)	7	5	1	0	0	0	0	0	0
20	CM	Toufik Addadi	(Algeria)	9	7	1	0	0	0	0	0	0
28	DM	Bonaventure Fonseca	(Senegal)	6	2	0	0	0	0	0	0	0
55	AM	Youcef Gherbi	(Algeria)	0	0	0	0	0	0	0	0	0
Forwards
7	ST	Ramdane Hitala	(Algeria)	7	7	2	0	0	0	0	0	0
9	ST	Ibrahim Harouna	(Niger)	5	1	1	0	0	0	0	0	0
10	LW	Walid Zamoum	(Algeria)	9	9	1	0	0	0	0	0	0
11	LW	Khaled Bousseliou	(Algeria)	1	0	0	0	0	0	0	0	0
12	RW	M'hend Sediri	(Algeria)	9	6	1	0	0	0	0	0	0
25	ST	Mehdi Ouamri	(Algeria)	3	0	0	0	0	0	0	0	0
26	ST	Ghilas Belgacem	(Algeria)	6	1	0	0	0	0	0	0	0
29	ST	Seyfeddine Bitam	(Algeria)	0	0	0	0	0	0	0	0	0
35	ST	Youcef Chikaoui	(Algeria)	4	0	0	0	0	0	0	0	0
37	RW	Farouk Laoufi	(Algeria)	2	0	0	0	0	0	0	0	0
Total				9		10	0		0	0		0

Last updated: 19 November 2026
Source: soccerway.com

=== Goalscorers ===
As of 19 November 2026

Includes all competitive matches.

No.	Nat.	Player	Pos.	L1	AC	TOTAL
7	(Algeria)	Ramdane Hitala	ST	2	0	2
20	(Algeria)	Toufik Addadi	CM	1	0	1
9	(Niger)	Ibrahim Harouna	ST	1	0	1
5	(Algeria)	Abdelkader Boutiche	DM	1	0	1
23	(Algeria)	Nasreddine Zaalani	CB	1	0	1
18	(Algeria)	Hicham Messiad	AM	1	0	1
10	(Algeria)	Walid Zamoum	LW	1	0	1
19	(Algeria)	Feth-Allah Tahar	AM	1	0	1
12	(Algeria)	M'hend Sediri	RW	1	0	1
Own Goals				0	0	0
Totals				10	0	10

=== Clean sheets ===
As of 19 November 2026

Includes all competitive matches.

					Clean sheets		
No.	Nat	Name	GP	GA	L1	AC	Total
1	(Algeria)	Rayane Yesli	9	6	6	0	6
16	(Algeria)	Benaouda Klileche	0	0	0	0	0
30	(Algeria)	Ahmed Alili	0	0	0	0	0
		TOTALS		6	6	0	6
