= Achref Abada =

Algerian footballer (born 1999)

Personal information
- Date of birth: 15 June 1999 (age 27)
- Place of birth: Tebesbest, Algeria
- Height: 1.87 m (6 ft 2 in)
- Position: Centre-back

Team information
- Current team: USM Alger
- Number: 28

Senior career*
Years	Team	Apps	(Gls)
2018–2021	MC El Eulma		
2021–2026	ASO Chlef	106	(0)
2026–	USM Alger	8	(0)

International career^{‡}
2025–	Algeria	13	(1)
- * Club domestic league appearances and goals as of 6 June 2026 ‡ National team caps and goals as of 6 October 2026

Achref Abada (Arabic: أشرف عبادة; born 15 June 1999) is an Algerian professional footballer who plays as a centre-back for Algerian Ligue Professionnelle 1 club USM Alger and the Algeria national team.

== Club career ==
=== ASO Chlef ===
On 26 September 2021, Abada joined ASO Chlef. Coach Sead Ramović saw him as the player who could immediately strengthen CR Belouizdad’s defense. Still under contract for one more season, Abada joined the club because of his current team’s financial situation.

=== USM Alger ===
On 31 January 2026, Achref Abada officially joined USM Alger on a contract lasting three and a half seasons, from ASO Chlef. With this signing, the Soustara based club strengthened its defensive line by recruiting a 26-year-old player, regarded as one of the promising defenders in his position. Abada notably distinguished himself during the 2025 FIFA Arab Cup, held in Qatar, where he delivered solid performances in every game.

In a statement published on 5 February 2026 on its official social media platforms, USM Alger announced that the player had been officially registered and cleared by FIFA, following the review of the administrative file submitted by the club. The Red and Black management further specified that the player’s registration on FIFA’s electronic platform was completed on 31 January 2026 at 00:05, ensuring full compliance with all administrative and legal procedures related to the transfer.

The transfer is reportedly the most expensive in Algerian football history, valued at 100 million dinars. USM Alger paid 8 billion centimes immediately, with 2 billion centimes due at the end of the season. Abada also receives a monthly salary of 410 million centimes. ASO Chlef secured a clause granting 30% of any future transfer fee. The deal also includes a special clause: USM Alger will finance ASO Chlef’s summer training camp next year if Abada is selected for the national team to prepare for the 2026 FIFA World Cup.

Achraf Abada was unable to participate in the 2025–26 CAF Confederation Cup with USM Alger due to an administrative issue related to his registration on the CAF player list, despite being signed during the winter transfer window.

== International career ==
Abada was called for 2024 African Nations Championship and 2025 FIFA Arab Cup.

On 31 May 2026, Abada was named in Vladimir Petković's 26-man Algeria squad for the 2026 FIFA World Cup.

== Career statistics ==
=== Club ===
As of 10 September 2026

Club	Season	League			Cup		Continental		Other		Total	
Club	Season	Division	Apps	Goals	Apps	Goals	Apps	Goals	Apps	Goals	Apps	Goals
ASO Chlef	2021–22	Ligue 1	24	0	—		—		—		24	0
ASO Chlef	2022–23	Ligue 1	11	0	4	0	—		—		15	0
ASO Chlef	2023–24	Ligue 1	29	0	1	0	1 (Note: All appearance(s) in CAF Confederation Cup)	0	—		31	0
ASO Chlef	2024–25	Ligue 1	29	0	1	0	—		—		30	0
ASO Chlef	2025–26	Ligue 1	13	0	—		—		—		13	0
ASO Chlef	Total		106	0	6	0	1	0	—		113	0
USM Alger	2025–26	Ligue 1	7	0	3	0	—		—		10	0
USM Alger	2026–27	Ligue 1	2	0	0	0	0	0	0 (Note: All appearances in Algerian Super Cup)	0	2	0
USM Alger	Total		7	0	3	0	0	0	0	0	10	0
Career total			113	0	9	0	1	0	—		123	0

== Honours ==
ASO Chlef

- Algerian Cup: 2022–23

USM Alger

- Algerian Cup: 2025–26
- CAF Super Cup: 2026
