= Zineddine Boutmène =

Algerian footballer (born 2000)

Personal information
- Full name: Zineddine Boutmène
- Date of birth: 21 October 2000 (age 26)
- Place of birth: Hussein Dey, Algeria
- Height: 1.78 m (5 ft 10 in)
- Position: Forward

Team information
- Current team: ES Sahel
- Number: 26

Youth career
- –2019: NA Hussein Dey

Senior career*
Years	Team	Apps	(Gls)
2019–2020	NA Hussein Dey	24	(1)
2020	Club Africain	0	(0)
2021–2023	ES Sahel	51	(7)
2023–2024	CR Belouizdad	5	(0)
2025-2026	ASO Chlef	20	(0)
2026-	ES Sahel	0	(0)

International career^{‡}
2019	Algeria U23		
2021–	Algeria A'	4	(0)
Medal record
Men's football
Representing Algeria
FIFA Arab Cup
Winner	2021 Qatar
- * Club domestic league appearances and goals as of 31 January 2026 ‡ National team caps and goals as of 13 December 2021

Zineddine Boutmène (Arabic: زين الدين بوتمن; born 23 March 2000) is an Algerian international footballer who plays ES Sahel.

== Career ==
In September 2020, Boutmène signed for Tunisian club Club Africain. In February 2021, he joined Tunisian club ES Sahel. In July 2023, signed for CR Belouizdad. In January 2025, he joined ASO Chlef. One year later, he left ASO Chlef. On 31 January 2026, he rejoined ES Sahel.

== Honours ==
Algeria

- FIFA Arab Cup: 2021

CR Belouizdad

- Algerian Cup: 2023–24
