= Ayoub Sadahine =

Algerian footballer (born 2001)

Personal information
- Date of birth: 16 June 2001 (age 25)
- Place of birth: Aïn Defla, Algeria
- Height: 1.85 m (6 ft 1 in)
- Position: Right-back

Team information
- Current team: JS Kabylie
- Number: 26

Youth career
- –2021: USM Bel Abbès

Senior career*
Years	Team	Apps	(Gls)
2021–2022	USM Bel Abbès		
2022–2024	SKAF Khemis Miliana		
2024–2026	ASO Chlef	56	(8)
2026–	JS Kabylie	9	(0)
- * Club domestic league appearances and goals as of 21:09, 19 November 2026 (UTC)

Ayoub Sadahine (born 16 June 2001) is an Algerian professional footballer who plays as a right-back for JS Kabylie.

== Club career ==
On 19 August 2026, he joined JS Kabylie, signing with the Kabyle club a three-year contract.
