= Yacine Aliane =

Algerian footballer (born 1999)

Personal information
- Full name: Yacine Aliane
- Date of birth: 21 January 1999 (age 27)
- Place of birth: Bab El Oued, Algeria
- Position: Winger

Team information
- Current team: MC Oran
- Number: 27

Youth career
- –2020: USM Alger

Senior career*
Years	Team	Apps	(Gls)
2020–	USM Alger	21	(2)
2021–2024	ASO Chlef	82	(11)
2024–	MC Oran	42	(3)
- * Club domestic league appearances and goals as of 6 June 2025

Yacine Aliane (Arabic: ياسين عليان; born 21 January 1999) is an Algerian footballer who plays for MC Oran in the Algerian Ligue Professionnelle 1.

== Career ==
In 2020, Aliane was promoted to USM Alger's first team. On 16 January 2021, Aliane made his first league appearance against RC Relizane. In 2021, he joined ASO Chlef. On 14 July 2024, he signed for MC Oran.

== Honours ==
ASO Chlef

- Algerian Cup: 2022–23
