= Abderrahmane Medjadel =

Algerian footballer (born 1998)

Personal information
- Full name: Abderrahmane Medjadel
- Date of birth: 1 July 1998 (age 28)
- Place of birth: Tighennif, Algeria
- Height: 1.90 m (6 ft 3 in)
- Position: Goalkeeper

Team information
- Current team: ASO Chlef
- Number: 16

Youth career
- –2015: IS Tighennif
- 2015–2017: ASM Oran

Senior career*
| Years | Team | Apps | (Gls) |
| 2017–2019 | GC Mascara | | |
| 2019–2021 | Olympique de Médéa | 20 | (0) |
| 2021–2022 | Paradou AC | 17 | (0) |
| 2022–2023 | JS Kabylie | 11 | (0) |
| 2024 | MSP Batna | | |
| 2024– | ASO Chlef | 46 | (0) |

International career^{‡}
| 2021– | Algeria A' | 2 | (0) |
Medal record
Men's football
Representing Algeria
FIFA Arab Cup
| Winner | 2021 Qatar |
- * Club domestic league appearances and goals as of 5 June 2026 ‡ National team caps and goals as of 17 June 2021

Abderrahmane Medjadel (Arabic: عبد الرحمن مجادل, born 1 July 1998) is an Algerian professional footballer who plays as a goalkeeper who plays for ASO Chlef.

== Club career ==
Medjadel is a youth product of IS Tighennif, before moving to the academy of ASM Oran. In 2017, he transferred to GC Mascara, where he got his first senior experience in the Algerian Ligue Professionnelle 2. He transferred to Olympique Médéa in 2019, where he helped them get promoted into the Algerian Ligue Professionnelle 1. He made his professional debut with Olympique Médéa in a 0–0 Algerian Ligue Professionnelle 1 tie with Sétif on 26 January 2021. In 2021, he joined Paradou AC. In 2022, he joined JS Kabylie.

== International career ==
Medjadel was called up to represent the senior Algeria A' national football team for a friendly in June 2021. He debuted in a friendly 1–0 win over Libera on 17 June 2021.

== Honours ==
Algeria

- FIFA Arab Cup: 2021
