= Edward Ledlum =

Liberian footballer (born 1999)

Personal information
- Full name: Edward Ledlum
- Date of birth: June 15, 1999 (age 27)
- Place of birth: Montserrado County, Liberia
- Height: 5 ft 9 in (1.75 m)
- Position: Forward

Team information
- Current team: ASO Chlef
- Number: 22

Youth career
- 2015: Joy FC Liberia
- 2016: Brewerville United

Senior career*
Years	Team	Apps	(Gls)
2017–2020	LISCR FC	14	(2)
2020	Energetik-BGU Minsk	0	(0)
2020–2023	Bea Mountain		
2023–2025	Paynesville		
2025–	ASO Chlef	30	(3)

International career^{‡}
2018–	Liberia	26	(1)
- * Club domestic league appearances and goals as of 13 September 2026 ‡ National team caps and goals as of 22:01, 29 September 2026 (UTC)

Edward Ledlum (born 15 June 1999) is a Liberian footballer who plays as a forward for Algerian Ligue 1 side ASO Chlef.

== Club career ==
Born in Montserrado County, Ledlum started his playing career at Joy Football Club in the Liberian third division. After a season with Joy FC, he moved to join Brewerville-based third division outfit, Brewerville United. His performance for Brewerville earned him a place in Montserrado County football team for the 2016-17 Liberian National County Meet. He played a key role in helping Montserrado County win the 2016-17 Liberia National County Meet He was later named as the Most Valuable Player of the 2016-17 Liberia National County Meet.

After winning the Liberia National County Meet with Montserrado County, he moved to LISCR FC in the Liberia First Division on a three-year deal. Despite coming from the third division, he became a key player in the LISCR team that won the 2016-17 LFA Cup and the Liberia First Division.

In February 2020, Ledlum moved to Energetik-BGU Minsk in the Belarus Premier League on a two-year deal but was left out of the squad registration at the start of the season after appearing in a single pre-season friendly. The following October, he debuted for Liberian Premier League club Bea Mountain, scoring a goal in the 2–1 victory.

In January 2025, Edward Ledlum left Panyesville FC to join ASO Chlef in the Algerian top flight.

== Career statistics ==
=== International ===
As of match played 29 September 2026

Appearances and goals by national team and year
National team	Year	Apps	Goals
Liberia	2018	1	0
Liberia	2019	4	0
Liberia	2021	1	0
Liberia	2022	2	0
Liberia	2023	1	0
Liberia	2024	6	0
Liberia	2025	7	1
Liberia	2026	4	0
Total		26	1

Scores and results list Liberia's goal tally first, score column indicates score after each Ledlum goal.

List of international goals scored by Edward Ledlum
No.	Date	Venue	Opponent	Score	Result	Competition
1	9 October 2025	Samuel Kanyon Doe Sports Complex, Paynesville, Liberia	Namibia	3–0	3–1	2026 FIFA World Cup qualification

== Honors ==
=== Club ===
LISCR FC

Winner

- Liberia First Division: 2016-17
- Liberian Cup| FA Cup: 2016-17

=== County Meet ===
Montserrado County

Winner

- Liberian National County Meet: 2016-17

=== Individual ===
Winner

- Liberian National County Meet: Most Valuable Player: 2016/2017
