= Ahmed Kerroum =

Algerian footballer (born 2000)

Personal information
- Full name: Ahmed Kerroum
- Date of birth: 27 June 2000 (age 26)
- Place of birth: Tripoli, Libya
- Height: 1.83 m (6 ft 0 in)
- Position: Defender

Team information
- Current team: MC Oran
- Number: 24

Youth career
- –2018: ASM Oran

Senior career*
Years	Team	Apps	(Gls)
2018–2020	ASM Oran		
2020–2022	JS Kabylie	42	(1)
2022–2024	ASO Chlef	40	(4)
2024–	MC Oran	66	(9)

International career^{‡}
2018	Algeria U18	3	(0)
- * Club domestic league appearances and goals as of 6 June 2026 ‡ National team caps and goals as of 29 June 2018

Ahmed Kerroum (Arabic: أحمد كروم; born 27 June 2000) is an Algerian professional footballer who plays as a defender for MC Oran.

== Career ==
Formed in ASM Oran, on 17 August 2020, Kerroum joined JS Kabylie. On 4 August 2022, he joined ASO Chlef. On 31 January 2024, Kerroum signed for MC Oran.
