= Abderrahim Hamra =

Algerian footballer (born 1997)

Personal information
- Full name: Abderrahim Hamra
- Date of birth: 21 July 1997 (age 29)
- Place of birth: Oran, Algeria
- Height: 1.85 m (6 ft 1 in)
- Positions: Central midfielder; defender

Team information
- Current team: MC Oran
- Number: 23

Youth career
- 2015–2016: ASM Oran

Senior career*
Years	Team	Apps	(Gls)
2016–2022	USM Alger	63	(4)
2017–2018	→ DRB Tadjenanet (loan)	15	(0)
2023–2025	ASO Chlef	64	(1)
2025–	MC Oran	27	(3)

International career^{‡}
2016	Algeria U20	2	(1)
2017	Algeria U23	6	(1)
- * Club domestic league appearances and goals as of 6 June 2026 ‡ National team caps and goals as of 8 May 2017

Abderrahim Hamra (Arabic: عبد الرحيم حمرة; born 21 July 1997) is an Algerian footballer who plays for MC Oran.

== Career ==
In 2017, Abderrahime Hamra signed a one-year loan contract with DRB Tadjenanet. In 2018, He returned to USM Alger after one-year loaning with DRB Tadjenanet. On 24 August 2020, Hamra signed a new contract with USM Alger until 2023. In 2023, he joined ASO Chlef. In 2025, he joined MC Oran.

== Honours ==
=== Club ===
USM Alger

- Algerian Ligue Professionnelle 1: 2018–19

ASO Chlef

- Algerian Cup: 2022–23
