= Gape Mohutsiwa =

Motswana footballer

Personal information
- Full name: Gape Edwin Mohutsiwa
- Date of birth: 20 March 1997 (age 29)
- Place of birth: Serowe, Botswana
- Height: 1.78 m (5 ft 10 in)
- Position: Midfielder

Senior career*
| Years | Team | Apps | (Gls) |
| 2013–2016 | Motlakase Power Dynamos | | |
| 2016–2019 | Township Rollers | | |
| 2019 | Gilport Lions | | |
| 2020–2022 | Jwaneng Galaxy | | |
| 2022–2025 | ASO Chlef | 52 | (1) |
| 2025–2026 | MC Oran | 25 | (1) |
| 2026– | IR Tangier | 0 | (0) |

International career^{‡}
| 2015– | Botswana | 33 | (4) |
- * Club domestic league appearances and goals as of 9 July 2026 ‡ National team caps and goals as of 14 October 2025

Gape Edwin Mohutsiwa (born 20 March 1997) is a Motswana professional footballer.

== Career ==
On 21 July 2022, he joined Algerian club ASO Chlef. On 24 July 2025, he joined Algerian club MC Oran. On 10 July 2026, he joined Moroccan club IR Tangier.

== Honours ==
ASO Chlef

- Algerian Cup: 2022–23
