= Ibrahim Farhi Benhalima =

Algerian footballer (born 1997)

Personal information
- Full name: Ibrahim Farhi Benhalima
- Date of birth: 16 April 1997 (age 29)
- Place of birth: Saïda, Algeria, Algeria
- Position: Midfielder

Team information
- Current team: Olympique Akbou
- Number: 8

Youth career
- –2015: MC Alger
- 2015: USM El Harrach

Senior career*
Years	Team	Apps	(Gls)
2015–2016	USM El Harrach	1	(0)
2016–2018	USM Alger	0	(0)
2017–2018	→ US Biskra (loan)	19	(0)
2018–2020	JS Saoura	36	(4)
2020–2021	Club Africain	0	(0)
2021	→ Olympique Béja (loan)	6	(0)
2021–2022	ES Sétif	17	(1)
2022–2023	MC Oujda	20	(1)
2023–2024	JS Saoura	11	(1)
2024–2026	ASO Chlef	53	(3)
2026–	Olympique Akbou	0	(0)

International career^{‡}
2016	Algeria U20	2	(0)
2018	Algeria U21	2	(0)
- * Club domestic league appearances and goals as of 10 June 2026 ‡ National team caps and goals as of 22 September 2020

Ibrahim Farhi Benhalima (Arabic: إبراهيم فرحي بن حليمة; born 16 April 1997) is an Algerian professional footballer who plays as a midfielder for Olympique Akbou.

== Club career ==
Benhalima made his professional debut for USM El Harrach on 19 September 2015. In 2021, he joined ES Sétif. In 2022, he joined MC Oujda. In July 2023, he returned to JS Saoura. On 5 February 2024, he joined ASO Chlef. On 10 June 2026, he joined Olympique Akbou.
