= Abdelhak Debbari =

Algerian footballer (born 1993)

Personal information
- Date of birth: 6 January 1993 (age 33)
- Place of birth: Algeria
- Height: 1.78 m (5 ft 10 in)
- Position: Defender

Team information
- Current team: ASO Chlef
- Number: 26

Senior career*
Years	Team	Apps	(Gls)
2013–2016	RC Boumerdes		
2016–2018	USM El Harrach	51	(0)
2018–2019	MO Béjaïa	26	(0)
2019–2022	ES Sétif	65	(4)
2022–2023	HB Chelghoum Laïd	7	(0)
2023–	ASO Chlef	78	(4)

International career^{‡}
2019–	Algeria	3	(0)
- * Club domestic league appearances and goals as of 6 June 2026 ‡ National team caps and goals as of 25 August 2022

Abdelhak Debbari (Arabic: عبد الحق دباري; born 6 January 1993) is an Algerian footballer who plays as a defender for ASO Chlef.

== Career ==
In 2023, he joined ASO Chlef.

== Honours ==
ASO Chlef

- Algerian Cup: 2022–23
