= Toufik Addadi =

Algerian footballer (born 1990)

Personal information
- Date of birth: 7 October 1990 (age 36)
- Place of birth: Saïda, Algeria
- Height: 1.73 m (5 ft 8 in)
- Position: Midfielder

Team information
- Current team: Olympique Akbou
- Number: 20

Youth career
- –2010: MC Saida

Senior career*
Years	Team	Apps	(Gls)
2010–2012	MC Saida	40	(0)
2012	JS Saoura	3	(0)
2013–2015	MC Saida	53	(4)
2015–2017	O Médéa	54	(11)
2017–2018	NA Hussein Dey	26	(4)
2018–2019	O Médéa	28	(5)
2019–2020	JS Kabylie	17	(1)
2020–2021	MC Alger	20	(1)
2021–2022	US Monastir	13	(0)
2022–2024	ASO Chlef	56	(11)
2024–2025	ES Mostaganem	12	(1)
2025–	Olympique Akbou	39	(7)
- * Club domestic league appearances and goals as of 6 June 2026

Toufik Addadi (Arabic: توفيق عدادي; born 7 October 1990) is an Algerian footballer who plays as a midfielder for Olympique Akbou.

== Career ==
In 2019, Addadi signed a contract with JS Kabylie. In 2020, he signed a contract with MC Alger. In 2021, he signed a contract with US Monastir. In 2022, Addadi joined ASO Chlef. In 2024 he signed for ES Mostaganem. In 2025, he joined Olympique Akbou.

== Honours ==
ASO Chlef

- Algerian Cup: 2022–23
