= Mohamed Boumezrag Stadium =

Sports stadium in Algeria

Coordinates: 36.161570°N 1.308791°E

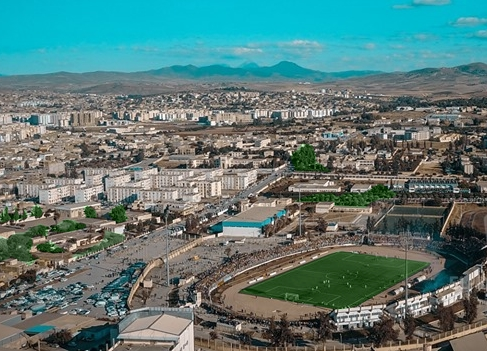
- Interactive map of Mohamed Boumezrag Stadium
- Full name: Mohamed-Boumezrag Stadium
- Location: Chlef, Algeria
- Owner: DJS Chlef
- Capacity: 18,000
- Surface: Artificial turf
- Field size: 100 m × 60 m

Construction
- Opened: 1970
- Renovated: 2004

Tenant
- ASO Chlef

Mohamed Boumezrag Stadium (Arabic: ملعب محمد بومزراق) is a multi-use stadium in Chlef, Algeria. It is currently used mostly for football matches and is the home ground of ASO Chlef. The stadium holds 18,000 people.
