= Maleh =

Maleh, el Maleh, el Malih, el Melah, etc. (Arabic: المالح, 'salty') may refer to:

== Rivers ==
- Wadi el Maleh, wadi (stream) in West Bank
- Oued el Melah, wadi in Tunisia, Gafsa and Tozeur governorates
- Oued el Maleh, wadi in Aïn Témouchent Province Algeria

== Populated places ==
- El Malah District, Aïn Témouchent Province, Algeria
- El Malah, municipality in El Malah District, Algeria
- Al-Malih, Syrian village

== Other uses ==
- Maleh (surname)

== See also ==
- Sayh al Malih, place in Oman
- Khirbet al-Malih ('ruins of al Malih'), Palestinian hamlet in West Bank
- Malich (disambiguation)
