= El Amria District =

Coordinates: 35.524726°N 1.014905°W

- District
- District location within Aïn Témouchent province map
- Interactive map of El Amria District
- Country: Algeria
- Province: Aïn Témouchent Province

Area
  - Total: 145.56 sq mi (377.01 km^{2})

Population (2010)
  - Total: 49,982
- Time zone: UTC+1 (CET)

El Amria District is a district of Aïn Témouchent Province, Algeria.

== Municipalities ==
The district is divided into 5 municipalities:

- El Amria
- Bou Zedjar
- Ouled Boudjemaa
- El Messaid
- Hassi El Ghella
