= Aïn Larbaâ District =

Coordinates: 35°24′27″N 0°52′54″W

- District
- Interactive map of Aïn Larbaâ District
- Country: Algeria
- Province: Aïn Témouchent Province

Area
  - Total: 220.85 sq mi (571.99 km^{2})

Population (2010)
  - Total: 39,913
- Time zone: UTC+1 (CET)

Aïn Larbaâ District is a district of Aïn Témouchent Province, Algeria.

== Municipalities ==
The district is further divided into 4 municipalities:

- Aïn El Arbaa
- Tamzoura
- Sidi Boumedienne
- Oued Sabah
