= Hammam Bou Hadjar District =

Coordinates: 35.379122°N 0.970488°W

Hammam Bou Hadjar District دائرة حمام بوحجر
- District
- District location within Aïn Témouchent province map

- Map of Algeria highlighting Aïn Témouchent Province
- Country: Algeria
- Province: Aïn Témouchent
- District seat: Hammam Bou Hadjar

Area
  - Total: 365.09 km^{2} (140.96 sq mi)

Population (2010)
  - Total: 46,625
  - Density: 127.71/km^{2} (330.76/sq mi)
- Time zone: UTC+01 (CET)
- Municipalities: 4

Hammam Bou Hadjar is a district in Aïn Témouchent Province, Algeria. It was named after its capital, Hammam Bou Hadjar.

== Municipalities ==
The district is further divided into 4 municipalities:

- Hammam Bou Hadjar
- Chentouf
- Oued Berkèche
- Hassasna
