= Ahmed Zabana =

Algerian militant (1926–1956)

- Zabana portrait
- Born: Ahmed Zahana; 1926; Zahana, French Algeria
- Died: 19 June 1956 (aged 29–30); Barberousse Prison, Algiers, French Algeria
- Cause of death: Execution by guillotine
- Resting place: Martyrs' Square, El Alia Cemetery, Algiers, Algeria
- Other name: H'mida
- Known for: National Liberation Front; National Liberation Army; Algerian War
- Movement: FLN, MTLD

Ahmed Zabana (Arabic: أحمد زبانة; real name: Ahmed Zahana; 1926 – 19 June 1956) was an Algerian fighter who participated in the outbreak of the Algerian War. He was executed by guillotine by French authorities on 19 June 1956, in Algiers.

== Early life ==
Zabana was born in 1926 in Saint-Lucien (now Zahana). The youngest of nine children, he was a member of the Algerian Muslim Scouts, which inspired nationalist feeling in him. He joined the Movement for the Triumph of Democratic Liberties in 1950. He later became a member of the military wing of a pro-independence secret society, and participated in a mail operation in Oran in 1950. He was later arrested and spent three years in prison and an additional three years in exile.

== Role in the preparation of the revolution ==
After the dissolution of the Revolutionary Committee of Unity and Action on 5 July 1954, Zabana was commissioned by Larbi Ben M'hidi to prepare for the revolution by obtaining weapons and personnel. Zabana's tasks were to structure revolutionary forces and train them, and also to visit strategic locations to choose places that could be made centers of revolution. Zabana succeeded in forming revolutionary cadres in Zahana, Oran, Aïn Témouchent, Hammam Bou Hadjar, Hassi El Ghella, and Chaabet El Ham. he then ordered the men of the cadres to gather subscriptions for buying weapons and ammunition. With Abdulmalek Ramadan, Zabana supervised the military training of the cadres. At a meeting on 30 October 1954, chaired by Ben M'hidi, the organizers of the revolution determined that it would begin with a series of attacks on the night of 1 November. The following day, 31 October, Zabana met with his units and assigned specific targets as well as a rendezvous point on Jabal al-Qada.

== Role in the revolution ==
On 1 November 1954, Zabana led a successful operation in Lamarda. After carrying out the offensive operations against the agreed French objectives, Zabana met with the leaders and members of the operational teams to assess them and plan what should be done in the coming stages. Zabana was captured in the Battle of Gar Bouklida on 11 November 1954, in which he was wounded. He was taken to a hospital and then to prison.

== Execution ==
On 21 April 1955, Zabana was brought to the military court in Oran and sentenced to death. On 3 May 1955, he was transferred to the Serkadji Prison in Algiers. He was executed on 19 June 1956. He is sometimes described as the first martyr (Chahid) to be the guillotined in the war.

== Legacy ==
The Ahmed Zabana National Museum and Ahmed Zabana Stadium in Oran are named after him. In 2012, the Algerian film director Saïd Ould Khelifa launched a biographical film Zabana! with the lead role of Zabana played by Imad Benchenni.
