= Aïn Kihel District =

Coordinates: 35.204383°N 1.196104°W

Aïn Kihel District دائرة عين كيحل
- District
- District location within Aïn Témouchent province map

- Map of Algeria highlighting Aïn Témouchent Province
- Country: Algeria
- Province: Aïn Témouchent
- District seat: Aïn Kihel

Area
  - Total: 353.58 km^{2} (136.52 sq mi)

Population (2010)
  - Total: 34,562
  - Density: 97.749/km^{2} (253.17/sq mi)
- Time zone: UTC+01 (CET)
- Municipalities: 4

Aïn Kihel is a district in Aïn Témouchent Province, Algeria. It was named after its capital, Aïn Kihel.

== Municipalities ==
The district is further divided into 4 municipalities:

- Aïn Kihel
- Aghlal
- Aoubellil
- Aïn Tolba
