= Malah =

Malah may refer to:

== Places ==
- El Malah, formerly Rio Salado, municipality in northwestern Algeria
- El Malah District, a district in Algeria
- Ouled Malah, town and commune in Algeria
- Malah, town in the Salkhad District of Al-Suwayda Governorate in Syria
- Tell Malah, Syrian town in Hama Governorate in Syria

== See also ==
- Brit malah or Brit milah, Jewish ceremony held for covenant of circumcision for Jewish males
- Mallah (disambiguation)
