= Rachgoun =

Rachgoun رشقون
- City
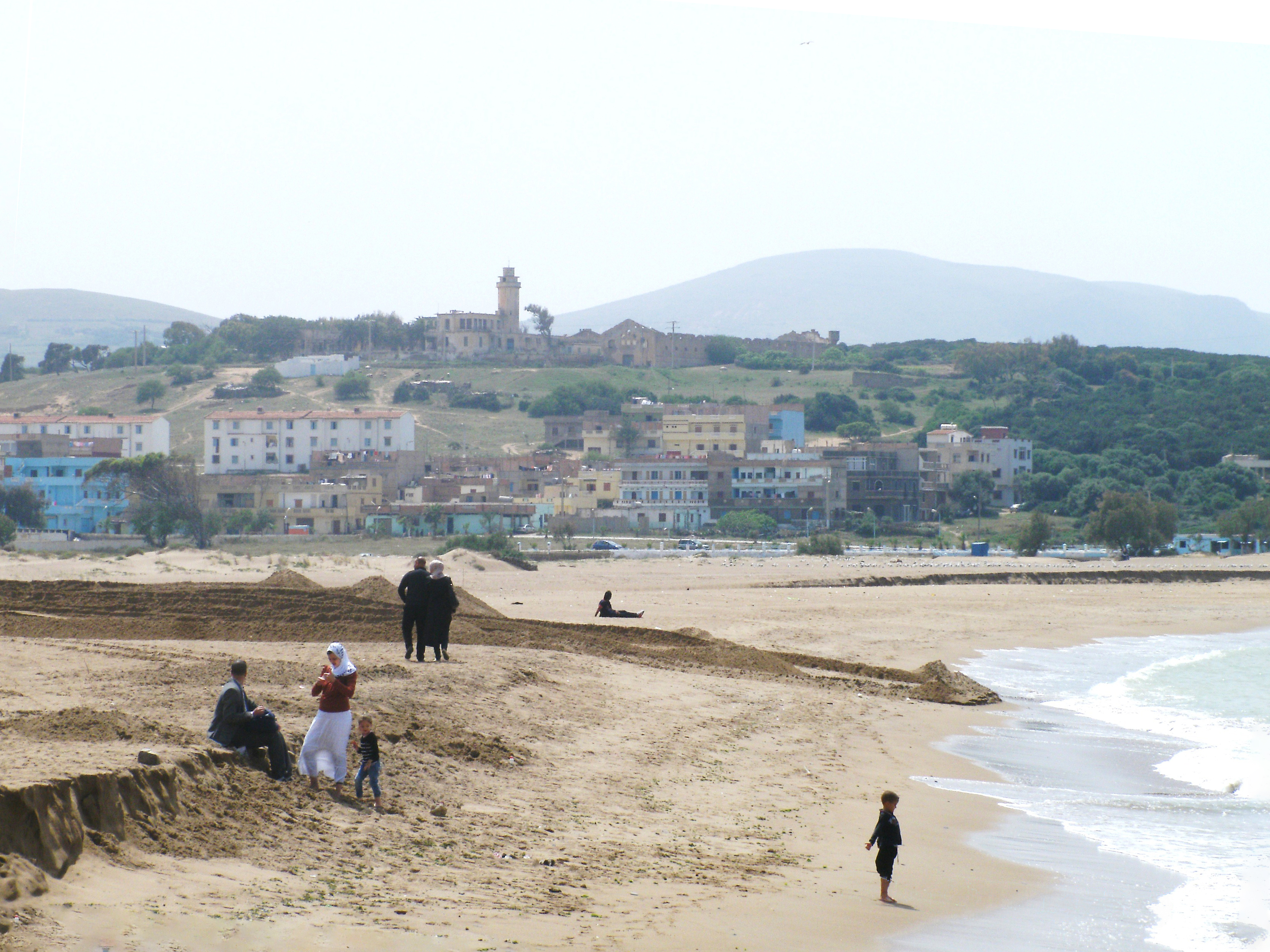
- the beach at Rachgoun

- Location within Algeria
- Coordinates: 35.323958°N 1.479767°W
- Country: Algeria
- Province: Aïn Témouchent
- District: Beni Saf

Population (1998)
  - Total: 1,450
- Climate: Csa

Rachgoun (Arabic: رشقون) is a town in northwestern Algeria, in the district of Béni-Saf.

It is a small coastal village at the mouth of the Tafna wadi, 7 km west of the commune capital and facing its eponymous island - Rachgoun Island - located 2 km offshore.

The village is organised around two sandy beaches, Rachgoun beach crossed by the stream which flows into it, and, further east, Madrid beach, a small beach in a cove, from which it is separated by a rocky promontory.

== History ==
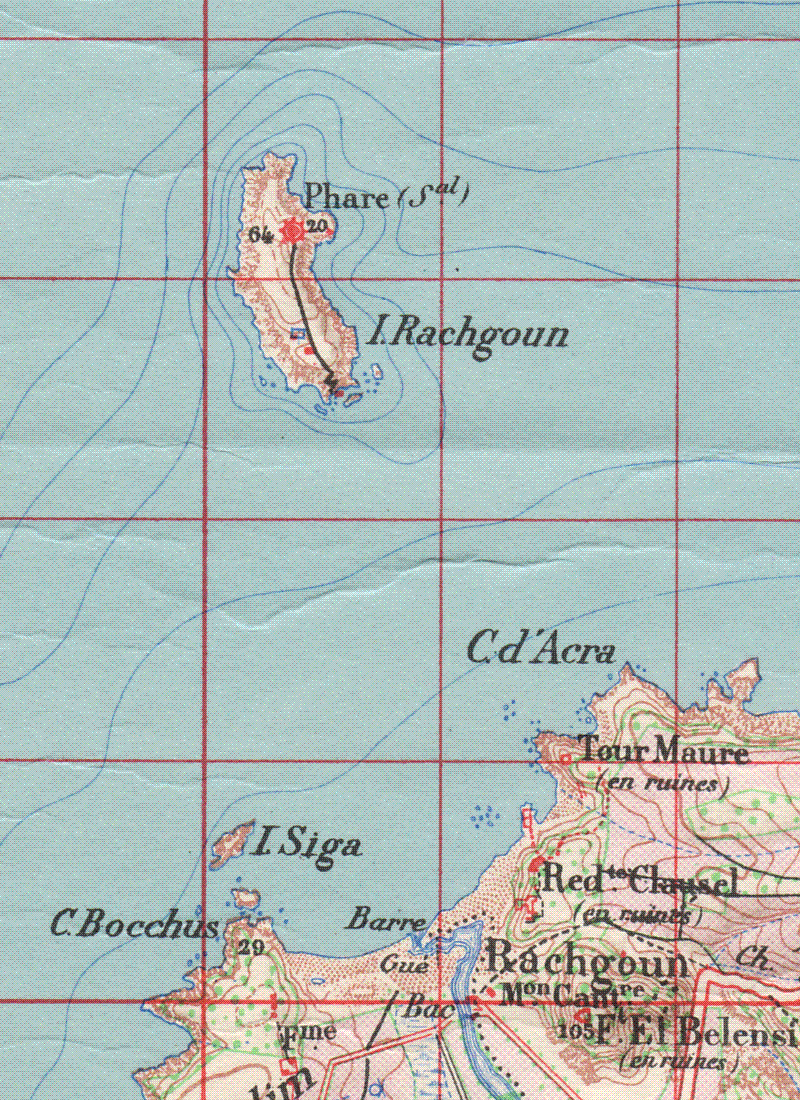
Topographical map of the region

The site of an old Punic trading post, it has been the subject of extensive excavations, on which Serge Lancel in particular worked. It is located not far from Siga, the Numidian capital of Syphax. In the Zianides era, Rachgun was a port. In 1836, the French set up a garrison on the island as well as a military establishment on the right bank of the mouth of the Tafna, southwest of the tip of the Tour Carrée.

== Bibliography ==
• Achour Cheurfi, Dictionnaire des localités algériennes, Algiers, Casbah Editions, 2011
