= Ali Meçabih =

Algerian footballer (born 1972)

Personal information
- Full name: Ali Meçabih
- Date of birth: 2 April 1972 (age 54)
- Place of birth: Hammam Bouhadjar, Algeria
- Height: 1.76 m (5 ft 9 in)
- Position: Striker

Youth career
- 1987–1990: US Hammam Bou Hadjar

Senior career*
Years	Team	Apps	(Gls)
1990–1993	CR Témouchent	–	(–)
1993–1994	ES Mostaganem	–	(–)
1994–2000	MC Oran	132	(58)
2000–2001	FC Martigues	26	(6)
2001–2002	Grenoble Foot	8	(0)
2002–2003	MC Oran	24	(6)
2003–2004	USM Blida	5	(1)
2004	USM Alger	4	(2)
2004–2005	USM Blida	–	(–)
2005–2006	MC Oran	10	(2)
2006–2008	CS Constantine	–	(–)

International career^{‡}
1995–2001	Algeria	28	(12)
- * Club domestic league appearances and goals as of July 2009 ‡ National team caps and goals as of 25 November 2009

Ali Meçabih (Arabic: علي مصابيح; born 2 April 1972) is an Algerian former footballer. He played as a striker.

== History ==
Born in Hammam Bou Hadjar, Ain Temouchent District, he was formed in US Hammam Bou Hadjar. He started playing in seniors with CR Témouchent but he played most of his career with MC Oran.

== Career statistics ==
=== International goals ===
Scores and results list Algeria's goal tally first. "Score" column indicates the score after the player's goal.

#	Date	Venue	Opponent	Score	Result	Competition
1.	28 November 1995	Stade Omnisports, Libreville	Cameroon	1–0	4–0	Friendly
2.	28 November 1995	Stade Omnisports, Libreville	Cameroon	4–0	4–0	Friendly
3.	18 January 1996	Free State Stadium, Bloemfontein	Sierra Leone	1–0	2–0	1996 African Cup of Nations
4.	18 January 1996	Free State Stadium, Bloemfontein	Sierra Leone	2–0	2–0	1996 African Cup of Nations
5.	28 May 1996	Sultan Qaboos Stadium, Muscat	Oman	0–1	0–1	Friendly
6.	6 October 1996	Stade du 5 Juillet, Algiers	Ivory Coast	1–0	4–1	1998 African Cup of Nations qualification
7.	6 October 1996	Stade du 5 Juillet, Algiers	Ivory Coast	2–0	4–1	1998 African Cup of Nations qualification
8.	28 June 2000	Stade Chedly Zouiten, Tunis	Tunisia	0–2	2–2	Friendly
9.	9 July 2000	Stade Hassan II, Fes	Morocco	0–1	2–1	2002 FIFA World Cup qualification
10.	11 March 2001	Cairo International Stadium, Cairo	Egypt	2–2	5–2	2002 FIFA World Cup qualification

== Honours ==
=== Club ===
MC Oran

- Algerian Cup: 1996
- Algerian League Cup: 1996
- Arab Cup Winners' Cup: 1997, 1998
- Arab Super Cup: 1999

=== International ===
- Has 28 caps (14 goals) for the Algerian National Team
- Played twice in the African Cup of Nations: 1996, 2000
