= Museo Etrusco Guarnacci =

Archaeological museum in Volterra, Tuscany, Italy

Coordinates: 43.4009°N 10.8643°E

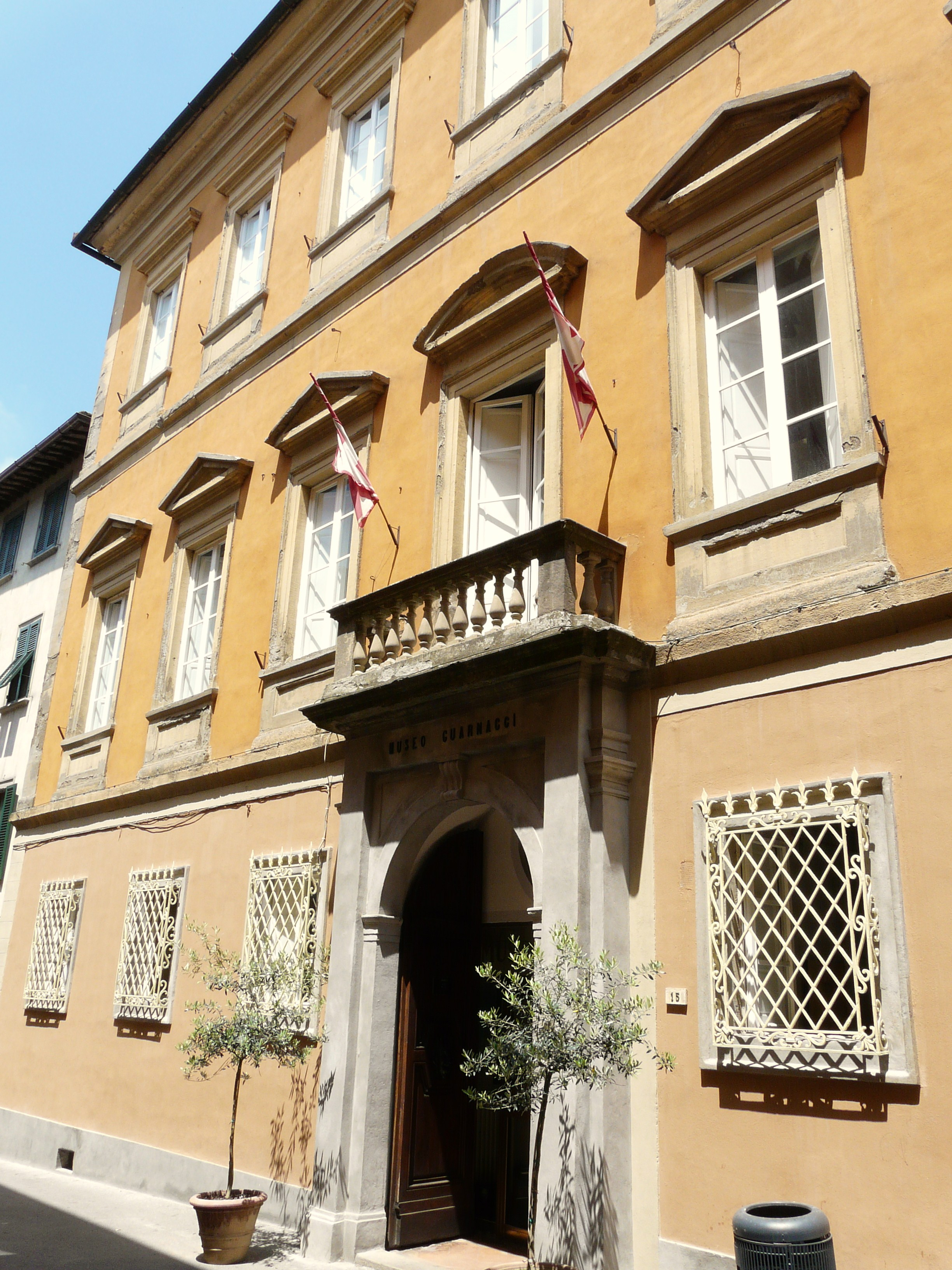
Facade of the Museum

The Museo Etrusco Guarnacci (in effect, the Guarnacci Museum of Etruscan Artifacts) is a public archeological museum located on Via Don Giovanni Minzoni #15 in Volterra, region of Tuscany, Italy. This was one of the first public museums in Italy, founded in 1761 by the aristocrat and abbott Mario Guarnacci (1701–1785).

== Description ==
Guarnacci was a zealous collector of antiquities, and donated his collection, including over 600 funerary urns, to "the citizens of the city of Volterra". The donation also included a rich library of more than 50,000 volumes. Guarnacci himself published a contemporaneously controversial text, Origini Italiche, claiming that Greek and Latin cultures had their origins in an antecedent Etruscan civilization.

The first Museum was housed in Palazzo Maffei in then Via Guidi, which had been purchased by Guarnacci to house his collection. At his death in 1785 the collection was moved to the 13th century Palazzo dei Priori. With further additions, the museum was transferred in 1877 by then director Niccolo Maffei to the Palazzo Desideri Tangassi.

The original displays were organized by theme rather than by chronology; for example, this arrangement still persists for in the displays of cinerary urns. In the first room on the ground floor, the museum displays the artifacts from the necropolis of the Badia and the Guerrucia excavated in 1892/1898. Additional findings from the site, discovered in 1996, in the Warrior's Tomb including a bronze crested helmet and a laminated bronze flask were added to the exhibit.

The second room displays a bucchero Kyathos from Monteriggioni, a series of bronze votive figurines and jewellery from the tomb in Gesseri di Berignone (Volterra) donated to the museum by Bishop Incontri in 1839. The Stele of Avile Tite from the 6th-century B.C. is on display.

In Room III, are displayed artifacts from the 5th-century B.C: a scarab in carnelian with a Greek inscription bearing the name of the artist (Lysandros), an Attic Krater attributed to the Berlin Painter, and the Etruscan calque sculpture, the Lorenzini Head.

In the second floor are artifacts from tombs of the Hellenistic centuries (6th-1st century B.C.). The urns would hold the cremated ashes of the honored dead, and their lids often represented a recumbent figure attending a banquet feast. In Room 30, are a display of urns made from local alabaster. Further rooms include artifacts in bronze and ceramics; mirrors, votive figurines, vases, locally minted coins, and black and red figure vases. Room 35 displays a statue of the 3rd century Mother and Child (Kourotrophos Maffei) and fragments of terracotta decorations from a temple facade. The museum also displays a collection of mosaic floor and Ancient coins.
