= Oulhassa Gheraba District =

Coordinates: 35°13′59″N 1°30′16″W

- District
- District location within Aïn Témouchent province map
- Interactive map of Oulhassa Gheraba District
- Country: Algeria
- Province: Aïn Témouchent Province

Area
  - Total: 58.1 sq mi (150.5 km^{2})

Population (2010)
  - Total: 22,054
- Time zone: UTC+1 (CET)

Oulhassa Gheraba District is a district of Aïn Témouchent Province, Algeria.

== Municipalities ==
The district is divided into 2 municipalities:

- Oulhaça El Gheraba
- Sidi Ouriache
