= Tadmaya =

- Country: Algeria
- Province: Aïn Témouchent
- Time zone: UTC+1 (West Africa Time)

Tadmaya is a village in Oulhaca El Gheraba municipality, in north-western Algeria.
