= El Malah District =

Coordinates: 35.392592°N 1.092941°W

El Malah District دائرة المالح
- District
- District location within Aïn Témouchent province map

- Map of Algeria highlighting Aïn Témouchent Province
- Country: Algeria
- Province: Aïn Témouchent
- District seat: El Malah

Area
  - Total: 233.95 km^{2} (90.33 sq mi)

Population (2010)
  - Total: 45,647
  - Density: 195.11/km^{2} (505.34/sq mi)
- Time zone: UTC+01 (CET)
- Municipalities: 4

El Malah is a district in Aïn Témouchent Province, Algeria. It was named after its capital, El Malah.

== Municipalities ==
The district is further divided into 4 municipalities:

- El Malah
- Ouled Kihal
- Terga
- Chaabet El Ham
