= Tedj Bensaoula =

Algerian footballer and manager (born 1954)

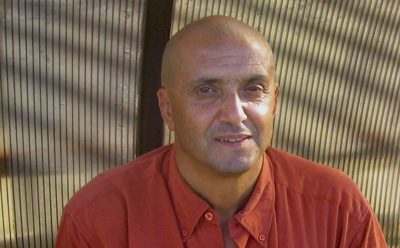
- Bensaoula in 2010

Personal information
- Full name: Tedj Bensaoula
- Date of birth: 1 December 1954 (age 71)
- Place of birth: Oued Berkeche, Algeria
- Height: 1.80 m (5 ft 11 in)
- Position: Striker

Youth career
- US H. Bou Hadjar

Senior career*
Years	Team	Apps	(Gls)
1970–1977	US H. Bou Hadjar	210	(37)
1977–1983	MP Oran		
1983–1986	Le Havre AC	73	(17)
1986–1987	USL Dunkerque	14	(2)

International career
1979–1986	Algeria	51	(19)

Managerial career
- 1999: Algeria
- 2001–2002: Algeria
- 2002: MC Oran
- * Club domestic league appearances and goals

Tedj Bensaoula (Arabic: تاج بن سحاولة) (born 1 December 1954) is an Algerian football manager and former footballer who played as a forward. He currently manages CR Témouchent in the Algerian Ligue Professionnelle 2.

== Biography ==
=== Early years ===
Tedj Bensaoula was born in the farm of his grandparents in Oued Berkeche, on the heights between the massifs of Hammam Bou Hadjar and Tessala. In 1958 his family was driven out of this area prohibited during the Liberation War. The family moved to Hammam Bou Hadjar when Tedj was four years old.

=== Club career ===
Bensaoula played with MC Oran in Algeria and with Le Havre AC and USL Dunkerque in France.

=== International career ===
Bensaoula participated with the Algeria national football team at two editions of the FIFA World Cup, in 1982 (one goal scored) and 1986. He also participated in the 1980 Summer Olympics.

== Gallery ==
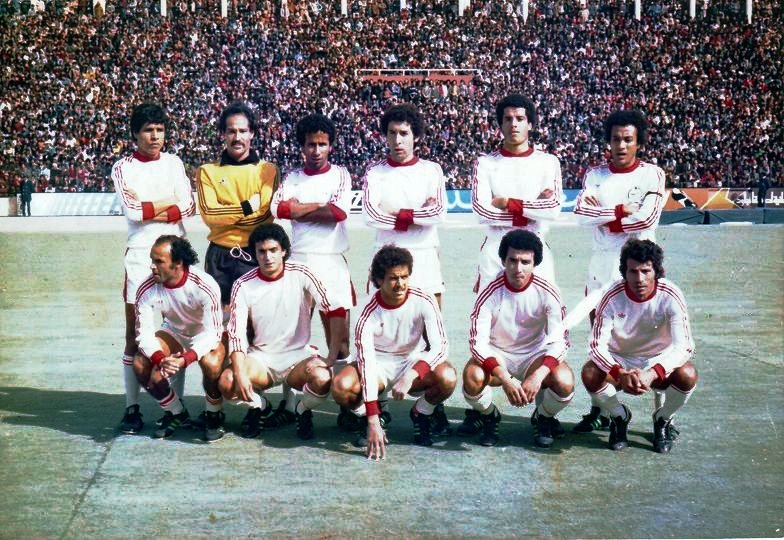
Bensaoula with MC Oran in 1978–79

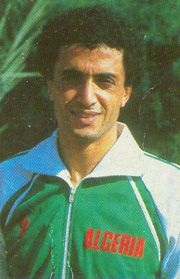
Bensaoula in 1986, posting for the 1986 WC

== Career statistics ==
=== International statistics ===
As of matches played on 6 June 1986

Algeria national team
Year	Apps	Goals
1979	5	4
1980	15	5
1981	4	1
1982	3	1
1983	10	4
1984	6	2
1985	4	2
1986	4	0
Total	51	19

==== International goals ====
Scores and results list Algeria's goal tally first. "Score" column indicates the score after the player's goal.

#	Date	Venue	Opponent	Score	Result	Competition
1.	21 September 1979	Omiš Stadium, Omiš	France Am.	1–1	1–1	1979 Mediterranean Games
2.	9 December 1979	Stade d'Honneur, Casablanca	Morocco	0–1	1–5	1980 Summer Olympics qualification
3.	9 December 1979	Stade d'Honneur, Casablanca	Morocco	0–2	1–5	1980 Summer Olympics qualification
4.	9 December 1979	Stade d'Honneur, Casablanca	Morocco	1–3	1–5	1980 Summer Olympics qualification
5.	16 March 1980	Liberty Stadium, Ibadan	Guinea	1–0	3–2	1980 African Cup of Nations
6.	16 March 1980	Liberty Stadium, Ibadan	Guinea	3–0	3–2	1980 African Cup of Nations
7.	31 May 1980	Steven Siaka Stadium, Freetown	Sierra Leone	2–1	2–2	1982 FIFA World Cup qualification
8.	13 June 1980	Stade du 19 Juin, Oran	Sierra Leone	2–0	3–1	1982 FIFA World Cup qualification
9.	12 December 1980	Stade du 17 Juin, Constantine	Sudan	1–0	2–0	1982 FIFA World Cup qualification
10.	10 April 1981	Stade du 19 Juin, Oran	Mali	1–0	5–1	1982 African Cup of Nations qualification
11.	16 June 1982	Estadio Carlos Tartiere, Oviedo	Chile	3–0	3–2	1982 FIFA World Cup
12.	8 April 1983	Stade du 5 Juillet, Algiers	Benin	1–0	6–2	1984 African Cup of Nations qualification
13.	8 April 1983	Stade du 5 Juillet, Algiers	Benin	2–0	6–2	1984 African Cup of Nations qualification
14.	10 June 1983	Stade du 5 Juillet, Algiers	Uganda	2–0	3–0	1984 Summer Olympics qualification
15.	14 August 1983	Stade Demba Diop, Dakar	Senegal	0–1	1–1	1984 African Cup of Nations qualification
16.	6 January 1984	Stade du 5 Juillet, Algiers	Egypt	1–0	1–1	1984 Summer Olympics qualification
17.	8 March 1984	Stade Bouaké, Bouaké	Ghana	2–0	2–0	1984 African Cup of Nations
18.	13 July 1985	Stade du 5 Juillet, Algiers	Zambia	1–0	2–0	1986 FIFA World Cup qualification
19.	28 July 1985	Independence Stadium, Lusaka	Zambia	0–1	0–1	1986 FIFA World Cup qualification

==== International goals (vs clubs) ====
#	Date	Venue	Opponent	Score	Result	Competition
1.	5 December 1980	Stade du 17 Juin, Constantine	(China) Liaoning FC	2–0	4–1	Friendly
2.	29 May 1982	Stade Olympique de la Pontaise, Lausanne	(Switzerland) Lausanne-Sport	0–?	0–4	Friendly
3.	29 May 1982	Stade Olympique de la Pontaise, Lausanne	(Switzerland) Lausanne-Sport	0–?	0–4	Friendly
4.	1 June 1982	Stade de la Vallée du Cher, Tours	(France) Tours FC	?–5	4–5	Friendly
5.	17 January 1983	Stade du 5 Juillet, Algiers	(England) Ipswich Town	1–?	1–1	Friendly

== Honours ==
=== Clubs ===
MC Oran

- Algerian Championship: Third place 1979

Le Havre

- French Ligue 2: 1985

=== International ===
- Mediterranean Games: Bronze medal 1979
- Africa Cup of Nations: Runner-up 1980; Third place 1984
- Summer Olympics: Quarterfinal 1980
- FIFA World Cup: First round 1982, 1986
