= List of islands of Algeria =

Algeria includes 32 islands and 208 small islands. Three-quarters of these islands are massive rocks protruding over the water without vegetation or clusters of completely arid rocks whose sole interest is sometimes that they are the basis for piers. The last quarter includes only islands with Superficial soils. Almost half of this last quarter is "Peninsular" similar to the continent and a quarter is uninhabitable except for birds. Therefore, there is only a quarter of a quarter valid for going to play or spending the weekend, and all these Algerian islands are small, not exceeding 1,200 meters in their largest dimensions and their height does not exceed 150 meters.

The largest Algerian islands
Name	Location	Height	Area
Habibas Islands	35°43′29″N 1°8′00″W	103 metres (338 ft)	0.4 square kilometres (0.15 sq mi)
Island of El Aouana	36°47′07″N 5°36′30″E	/	0.03 square kilometres (0.012 sq mi)
Rachgoun Island	35°19′20″N 1°28′48″E	84 metres (276 ft)	0.26 square kilometres (0.10 sq mi)
Mansourieh Island	36°40′45″N 5°28′44″E	/	0.06 square kilometres (0.023 sq mi)
