= Béni Saf District =

Coordinates: 35.302089°N 1.383671°W

Béni Saf District دائرة بني صاف
- District
- District location within Aïn Témouchent province map

- Map of Algeria highlighting Aïn Témouchent Province
- Country: Algeria
- Province: Aïn Témouchent
- District seat: Béni Saf

Area
  - Total: 172.96 km^{2} (66.78 sq mi)

Population (2010)
  - Total: 56,138
  - Density: 324.57/km^{2} (840.64/sq mi)
- Time zone: UTC+01 (CET)
- Municipalities: 3

Béni Saf is a district in Aïn Témouchent Province, Algeria. It was named after its capital, Béni Saf.

== Municipalities ==
The district is further divided into three municipalities:

- Béni Saf
- Sidi Safi
- El Emir Abdelkader
