= Oued el Maleh =

Aïn Témouchent Province
- Map of Algeria highlighting Aïn Témouchent
- Coordinates: 35°18′N 01°08′W

Oued el Maleh, Oued el Malah, Wadi el Maleh, etc. (Arabic: وادي المالح) is a wadi in Aïn Témouchent Province, Algeria. The name literally means "Salty Wadi". It was known in the past in Spanish as Rio Salado or "Salty River".

Oued el Maleh is in the northwest part of Algeria and drains into the Mediterranean Sea at about 35.442169°N 1.236836°W within Terga Municipality. Its watershed covers much of the province and is of elongated shape with an area of 932.56 km^{2}. approximately between 1°9’24’’ and 1°26’17’’W of longitude and between 35°17’22’’ and 35°16’37’’N of latitude and maximal altitude of 808m in the south. The climate is semi-arid Mediterranean.
