= Camarata (Mauretania) =

Ancient Mediterranean port

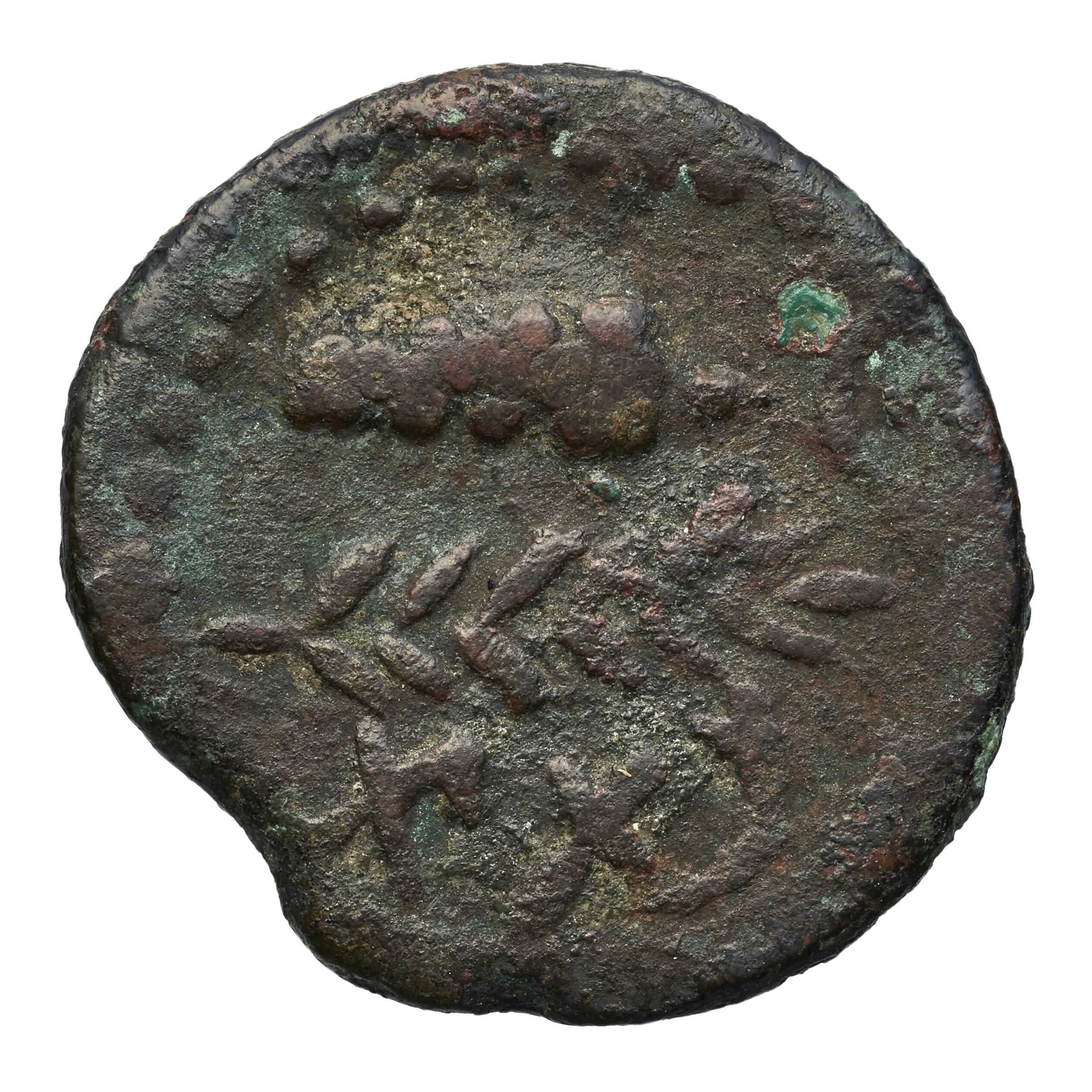
- A coin of Camarata, with the Neo-Punic legend kmʾ

- Location within Algeria
- 35°21′16″N 1°17′14″W
- Location: Sidi Djelloul
- Region: Sidi Safi, Aïn Témouchent, Algeria

Camarata (Punic: 𐤊𐤌𐤀, kmʾ) was a Carthaginian and Roman port on the Mediterranean near Siga in Mauretania. Under the Romans, it was part of the province of Mauretania Caesariensis. Its ruins are thought to be those at the mouth of the Wadi Ghazer at Sidi Djelloul in Sidi Safi, Algeria. The maritime town was near Siga.

== History ==
Camarata released bronze coins stamped with the town's Punic name and a crudely-done head obverse and grapes and an ear of wheat reverse. It has been associated with Zimran or described as a Zimrite country along with Thamarita and Tumarra.

After the French occupation of Algeria, the area around Camarata became known for its high-quality iron ore. The road to Beni Saf, for instance, which had large deposit of iron ore, traversed Camarata.
