= Boumediene =

Boumediene, Boumeddiene, Boumeddienne, Boumedienne, Boumedien, Boumeddien, or Boummedienne is an Arab surname. It can refer to:

== People ==
- Abu Madyan (c. 1126 – 1198), also known as "Bou Medine" or "Boumediene", Andalusian mystic and Sufi master
- Houari Boumediène (1932–1978), President of Algeria from 1967 to 1978
- Lakhdar Boumediene (born 1966), Bosnian prisoner held in the Guantanamo Bay detention camp; plaintiff in Boumediene v. Bush
- Josef Boumedienne (born 1978), Swedish ice hockey player
- Hayat Boumeddiene (born 1988), French terrorist and fugitive
- Yahya Boumediene (born 1990), Belgian footballer
- Sascha Boumedienne (born 2007), Swedish ice hockey player

== See also ==
- Boumediene v. Bush, 2008 United States Supreme Court decision involving a habeas motion by Lakhdar Boumediene
- Houari Boumediene Airport, airport in Algiers, Algeria
- Sidi Boumedienne, municipality in northwest Algeria
