= Mallah =

Mallah (Arabic: ملاح, lit. 'to move its wing like a bird') may refer to:

- Mallaah, or Mallah, a subcaste and ethnic group of traditional boatmen and fishermen tribes found in North India, East India, Northeastern India and Pakistan

== People with the surname Mallah ==
- Ammar Mallah (born 1938), Algerian Arab nationalist and writer
- Arfana Mallah, Pakistani Human rights activist
- Hossein Ali Mallah (1921–1992), Iranian musician, musicologist, painter, and author
- Kripanath Mallah (born 1973), Indian politician
- Mahlagha Mallah (1917–2021), Iranian environmental activist and librarian
- Mar'i Pasha al-Mallah (1856–1930), Syrian political leader and statesman
- Molvi Ahmed Mallah (1877–1969), British Indian Sindhi poet, translator
- Oveis Mallah (born 1966), Iranian wrestler
- Sambhu Sing Mallah, Indian politician
- Taj Muhammad Mallah, Pakistani politician
- Zaky Mallah (born 1983), Australian terrorist

== Other uses ==
- Mallah, Iran, village in Dezpart County, Khuzestan province, Iran
- Mallah wrestling, Sindhi traditional wrestlers
- Laar Museum and Molvi Haji Ahmed Mallah Library in Badin, Sindh, Pakistan
- Monsieur Mallah, fictional character from DC Comics
