= Giovanni Gualberto de Soria =

Italian philosopher (1707–1767)

Giovanni Gualberto de Soria (April 10, 1707 – August 16, 1767) was an Italian philosopher who supported sensism, praising Galileo and critical of Cartesianism. He taught logic and philosophy at the University of Pisa and wrote Rationalis philosophiae institutiones (1741).

== Life and work ==
Gualberto Soria was born to Enrico Soria and Maria Elisabetta of Sedie in Pisa. His father, likely of Spanish origin, had lived in Campo on the Island of Elba and moved to Pisa around 1698 to work in the postal service. Gualberto studied in Livorno in Jesuit schools until 1720 and was a friend of Clovis Maria Pentolini. He studied rhetoric at the Jesuit Cicognini College in Prato. Around 1725 he returned to Livorno and joined a circle of Galilean experimentalists along with doctor Ictier, jurists G. A. Padroni and Guiseppe Athias, and Giacinto Cestoni. Here he was exposed to the works of Bacon, Boyle and other non-Italian works. He then studied law at the University of Pisa as desired by his father but also attended philosophical courses. His teachers included Luigi Guido Grandi, Giuseppe Averani, and Pascasio Giannetti. After graduating in 1727 he became a reader of philosophy at the University of Turin. In 1731 he was appointed professor of logic at the University of Pisa by Grand Duke Giangastone. In 1735 he became chair of philosophy and was also appointed librarian. He was known for his popular lectures and was invited to the University of Berlin by Frederick the Great. His first book Rationalis philosophiae institutiones (1741) was published in Amsterdam and then translated into English. He had examined the work of Jean le Clerc, Logica sive Ars ratiocinandi (1692) and followed many ideas from it.

He provided various views on rational thought including canons such as:

"Wherever there is a problem to be explained, whether it is of the first, second, or third kind; if it is certain that its solution belongs to the third source, and will, therefore, be derived from another person's evidence and another person's words, take diligent care that, by mistake, you do not misinterpret the thoughts of those whose evidence you consult through the words and expressions they use."

"If anyone asserts or denies something, using words of a doubtful and ambiguous force, do not interpret those words or expressions rashly or erroneously in terms of your own usage and ideas; but, if the writer who uses them can be consulted, question him, so that he expounds what he means, and keep at him with questions, until he defines his words in such a way that there remains no obscurity or doubt about his thoughts and meaning."

"If the writer, whose evidence you need and whose thoughts it is important for you to grasp, does not use your language, and cannot be questioned or consulted, and you must search out his thoughts from his writings; be very careful not to interpret, without accurate investigation, the words and expressions he uses in that sense in which you confusedly use them, and do not interpret them rashly and imprudently just from the dictionaries’ definitions alone."

"Do not neglect the knowledge of time and place, if it is important for your understanding of writers."

"Consult the complete texts of writers with the greatest accuracy, if you want to avoid losing sight of what they had in mind."

"If a writer uses words about his subject whose sense is not immediately apparent and whose meanings are difficult to perceive, and uses expressions that are obscure or doubtful and have many different significations, and yet are not out of context, or if what he remarked about that subject depends on the trustworthiness of the evidence of others, have recourse to the Pyrrhonic period, and find the writer’s meaning in each case."

De Soria spent his holidays in the Calci area where his mother was from and he died in Sant'Andrea a Lama and is buried in the church there.
