= Camarata =

Camarata may refer to:

- Pete Camarata (born 1946), American labor activist
- Salvador Camarata (1913–2005), American jazz trumpeter
- Camarata Music Company
- Camarata, a town in ancient Mauretania
