= Malich =

Malich (Persian: ملچ) may refer to:

- Malich-e Bozorg
- Malich-e Kuchek
