= Albulae =

- Location within Algeria
- 35°18′00″N 1°08′00″W
- Location: Algeria
- Region: Aïn Témouchent Province

Albulae is an ancient city and former bishopric in Roman Africa. It remains a titular see of the Roman Catholic Church. It is identified with the modern town of Ain Temouchent, in present Algeria, near the Moroccan border.

== History ==
Albulae was initially important enough in the Roman province of Mauretania Caesariensis to become one of the suffragans of the Metropolitan Archbishopric for its capital, Caesarea Mauretaniae. However, its influence gradually waned.

== Titular bishopric ==
The diocese was nominally restored in 1933 as a Latin titular bishopric.

Titular bishops of Albulae, of the lowest (episcopal) rank, with an archiepiscopal exception, have been :

- Percival Caza (1948.08.11 – 1966.09.22), later Bishop of Valleyfield, Quebec
- Titular archbishop Edward Daniel Howard (1966.12.09 – 1983.01.02), as emeritate; previously Titular Bishop of Isauropolis (1923.12.23 – 1926.04.30), Auxiliary Bishop of Davenport (USA) (1923.12.23 – 1926.04.30), Metropolitan Archbishop of Oregon City (1926.04.30 – 1928.09.26),

Metropolitan Archbishop of Portland in Oregon (USA) (1928.09.26 – 1966.12.09)

- Vicente Credo Manuel, Divine Word Missionaries (S.V.D.) (1983.03.17 – 2007.08.18)
- João Carlos Seneme, Stigmatines (C.S.S.) (2007.10.17 – 2013.06.26), later Bishop of Toledo, Parana, Brazil
- Marco Eugênio Galrão Leite de Almeida (2013.09.25 - ... ), Auxiliary Bishop of São Salvador da Bahia (Brazil)

== Sources and external links ==
- GCatholic with titular incumbent bio links
