= Mario Guarnacci =

Italian archaeologist (1701–1785)

Monsignor Mario Guarnacci
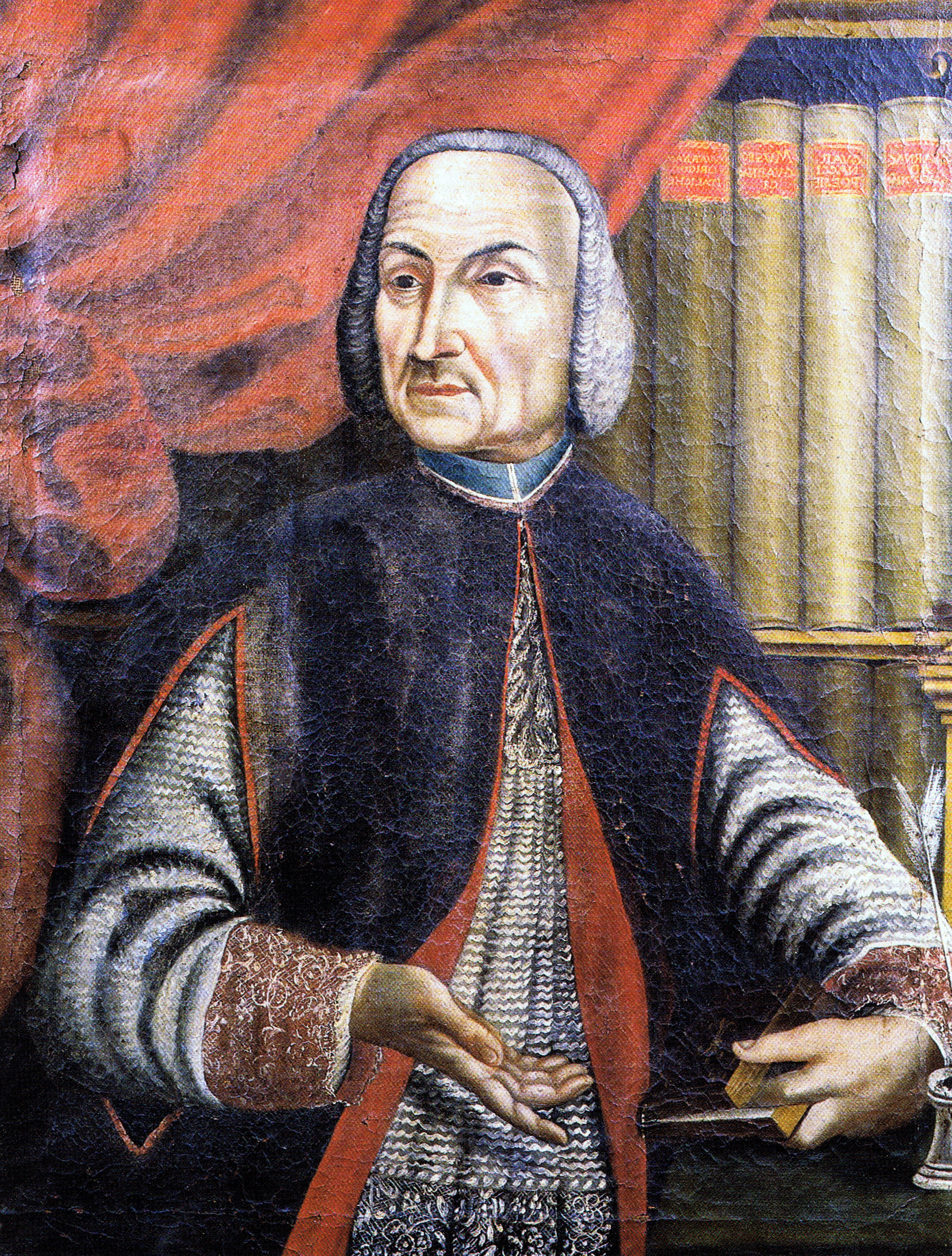
- Mario Guarnacci
- Born: October 25, 1701; Volterra, Grand Duchy of Tuscany
- Died: 21 August 1785 (aged 83); Volterra, Grand Duchy of Tuscany
- Other name: Zelalgo Arassiano
- Occupations: archeologist and historian
- Known for: Origini Italiche; Museo Etrusco Guarnacci
- Parent(s): Raffaello Ottaviano Guarnacci and Girolama Guarnacci (née Bargagli)

Academic background
- Education: University of Pisa

Academic work
- Discipline: Ancient history, Archaeology
- Sub-discipline: Etruscology

Mario Guarnacci (October 25, 1701 – August 21, 1785) was an Italian prelate, archeologist, and historian. He was one of the first scholars to carry out systematic excavations of Etruscan tombs.

== Biography ==
Mario Guarnacci was born at Volterra, Province of Pisa, one of eight children of a wealthy aristocrat Raffaello Ottaviano, who was gentleman of the chamber of the Tuscan Grand Duke Cosimo III de' Medici and a commendatore of the Order of Saint Stephen.

Mario pursued his first education in Volterra in a school sponsored by the Piarists. At the age of 17, he pursued studies in Florence under various teachers, including Philosophy and Theology with the Piarists; Mathematics under Lorenzo Lorenzini; and classic literature under Anton Maria Salvini. Mario would in 1751 submit a short biography of Salvini for the Vite degli Arcadi illustri published in Rome. Among the student peers of Mario in Florence were the future erudite scholars Gori and Lami. In early 1720, he began studies in civil and canon law at the University of Pisa attending lessons by Tanucci and Averani. However, he never obtained a degree. He did frequent the scholarly academies of Florence including the Apatisti.

After recovering from a serious illness by 1726, he moved to Rome again to study law, hoping for an appointment with the papal Curia. Fortunately in 1730 the pope Clement XII, from the Florentine Corsini family, appointed a prebend of the Abbey of San Girolamo in Pisa, with a stipend. He received further appointments in 1731 as papal chamberman of honor and auditor for the Cardinal Alamanno Salviati. In 1733, he was inducted as a Roman priest and in 1734 was a canon of San Giovanni in Laterano. In the 1740s, Pope Benedict XIV charged him to continue Alfonso Chacón's Lives of the Popes, but in 1757, Guarnacci retired back to Volterra. He discovered there the remains of Roman baths. He also collected a large number of Etruscan antiquities, which he bequeathed to his native city for a public museum, and form the core of the present Museo Etrusco Guarnacci. The donation also included a rich library of more than 7,000 volumes.

His most important work was Le Origini Italiche, first published in 1767 in Lucca. in which he maintained the chronological priority of the Etrusco-Pelasgians over the other peoples of Italy and Greece. According to Guarnacci, the Pelasgian-Tyrrhenians of Italy migrated in prehistoric times and brought an Italic culture to savage and uncouth Greece. Guarnacci's theories gave rise to a lively controversy involving several prominent historians and scholars of the period, such as Giovanni Lami, Scipione Maffei and Antonio Francesco Gori.

== Works ==
- Dissertazione sopra le XII Tavole (Florence, 1747);
- Vitae et Res Gestae Pontificum Romanorum, etc. (Rome, 1751);
- Origini Italiche (Lucca, 1767–72);
- Poesie di Zelalgo Arassiano (Lucca, 1769).

== Bibliography ==
- This article incorporates public domain material from McClintock, John; Strong, James (1867–1887). Cyclopædia of Biblical, Theological and Ecclesiastical Literature. Harper and Brothers.
- Maffei, Raffaello (1881). Tre volterrani: Enrico Ormanni, Giovan Cosimo Villafranchi, Mario Guarnacci. Pisa: Nistri. pp. 50–78.
- Cateni, Gabriele (1985). "Guarnacci, Mario". In M. Cristofani (ed.). Dizionario della civiltà etrusca. Florence: Giunti Editore. p. 133.
- Cateni, Gabriele (1992). "Il collezionismo archeologico a Volterra: Mario Guarnacci". In M. Cristofani (ed.). La scoperta degli Etruschi: quaderno di documentazione. Rome: Istituto della Enciclopedia italiana. pp. 143–151.
- Vannini, Fabrizio (2003). "GUARNACCI, Mario". Dizionario Biografico degli Italiani (in Italian). Vol. 60: Grosso–Guglielmo da Forli. Rome: Istituto dell'Enciclopedia Italiana. ISBN 978-88-12-00032-6.
