= Aïn Témouchent District =

Coordinates: 35°18′N 1°08′W

- District
- District location within Aïn Témouchent province map
- Interactive map of Aïn Témouchent District
- Country: Algeria
- Province: Aïn Témouchent Province

Area
  - Total: 58.61 sq mi (151.81 km^{2})

Population (2010)
  - Total: 89,644
- Time zone: UTC+1 (CET)

Aïn Témouchent District is a district of Aïn Témouchent Province, Algeria.

== Municipalities ==
The district is divided into 2 municipalities:

- Aïn Témouchent
- Sidi Ben Adda
