= Palazzo Maffei, Volterra =

Coordinates: 43.40200°N 10.86090°E

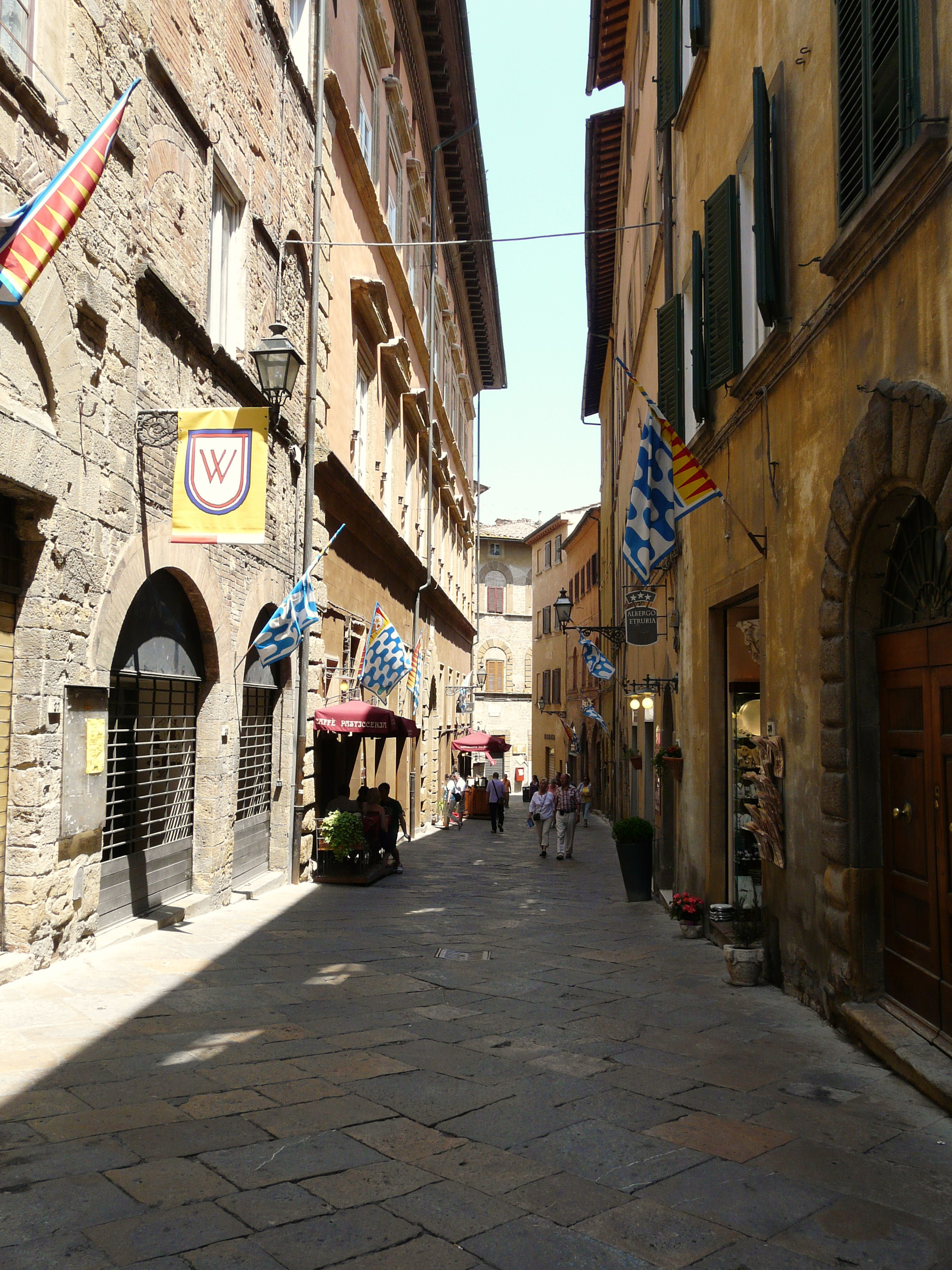
Palazzo Maffei on far left of the street

The Palazzo Maffei is a Renaissance-style aristocratic palace located on Via Giacomo Matteotti #35 in central Volterra, province of Pisa, region of Tuscany, Italy. While initially commissioned by the Bishop Mario Maffei (1463–1537) who had been secretary to Popes Eugene IV and Pius II. Mario was the brother of Raffaele Maffei, who also resided, along with his library, in this palace while in Volterra. The palace had been completed by 1527. Initially the palace facade had an exterior frescoed facade with a depiction of a Roman triumph by Daniele Ricciarelli.

However the palace has had a number of owners since then, and the interiors have had multiple refurbishments. The palace is also known for the other owners as the Palazzo Ruggieri, Ruggieri Buzzaglia. It was owned by the Leoncini circa 1840. When Mario Guarnacci purchased the palace in the late 18th century he installed a museum of his Etruscan collection in the ground floor; at his death in 1785 the collection was moved to the Palazzo dei Priori. The street in front was once called Via Guidi, and changed to Giacomo Matteotti after the Second World War, to commemorate the Socialist politician murdered in 1924 by Fascists.
