= Stele of Avile Tite =

Etruscan limestone stele

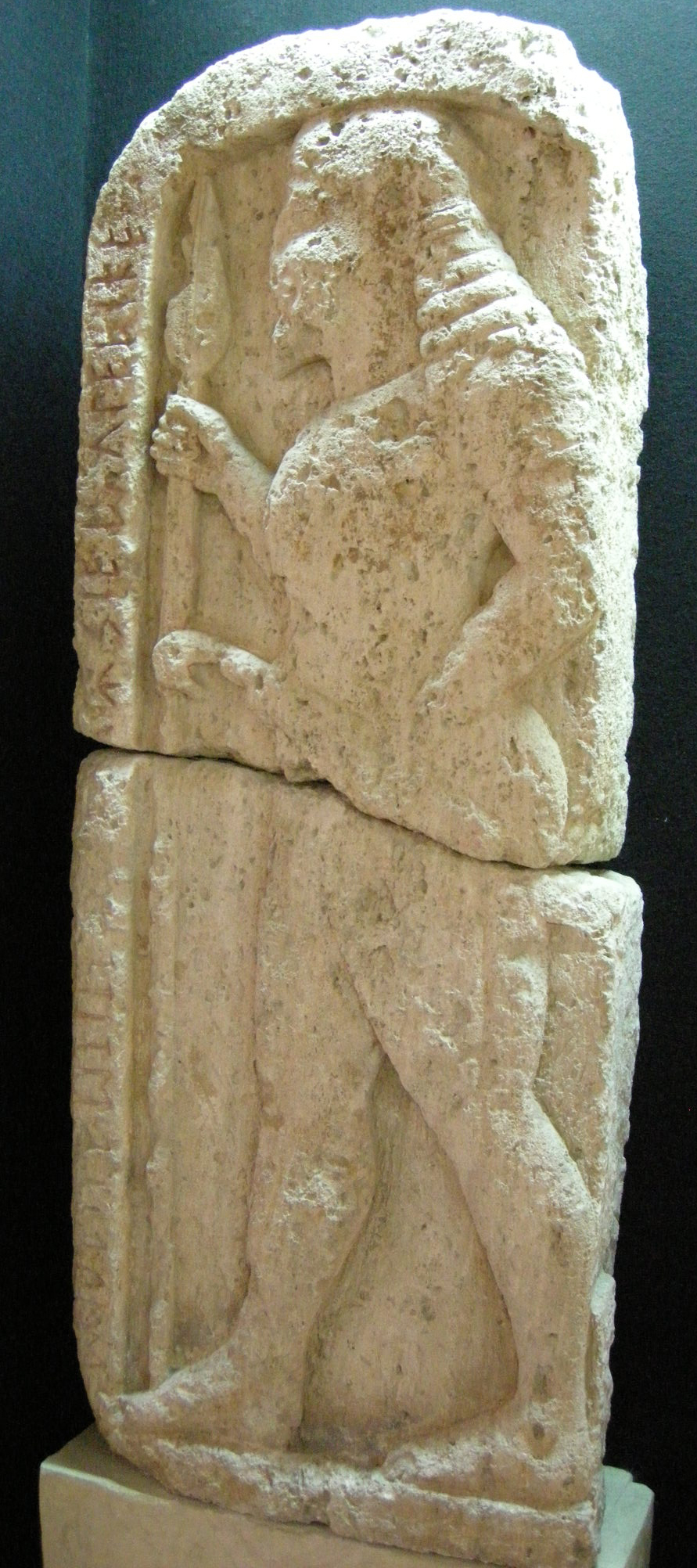
- Year: c. 550 BC
- Type: stele
- Medium: limestone
- Dimensions: 170 cm (67 in)
- Location: Museo Guarnacci, Volterra

The Stele of Avile Tite is a monumental Etruscan limestone stele, 1.7 m high, which is kept in the Museo Guarnacci in Volterra.

== History and description ==
The stele is a notable artefact, datable to c.550 BC and discovered in two fragments. It shows a warrior in relief within a border with an inscription (which says "I belong to Avile Tites, ...uchsie donated me" TLE^{2} 386), typical of central northern Etruria, with Greco-oriental influences.

The warrior, to whom the stele was dedicated as a tombstone, is represented in profile in full armour, facing left, with his legs split as if he was in motion. He wears a short tunica, a cuirass (lorica), shoulder armour, and greaves on his shins and is armed with a lance and a dagger with a curved hilt. His body is depicted in profile, like his face, which has a pointy beard, layered hair, elongated eyes and lips bent in a smile.

The style of the stele is influenced by a taste for full, monumental forms, typical of the late Ionic style. The hairstyle, of the"Daedalic" type, demonstrates the provincial scope of the warrior, on account of a use which must now be dated to the period.

== Bibliography ==
- Ranuccio Bianchi Bandinelli & Mario Torelli, L'arte dell'antichità classica, Etruria-Roma, Utet, Torino 1976.
