= Zahana =

Coordinates: 35°31′N 0°25′W

Zahana زھانة
- Commune and town
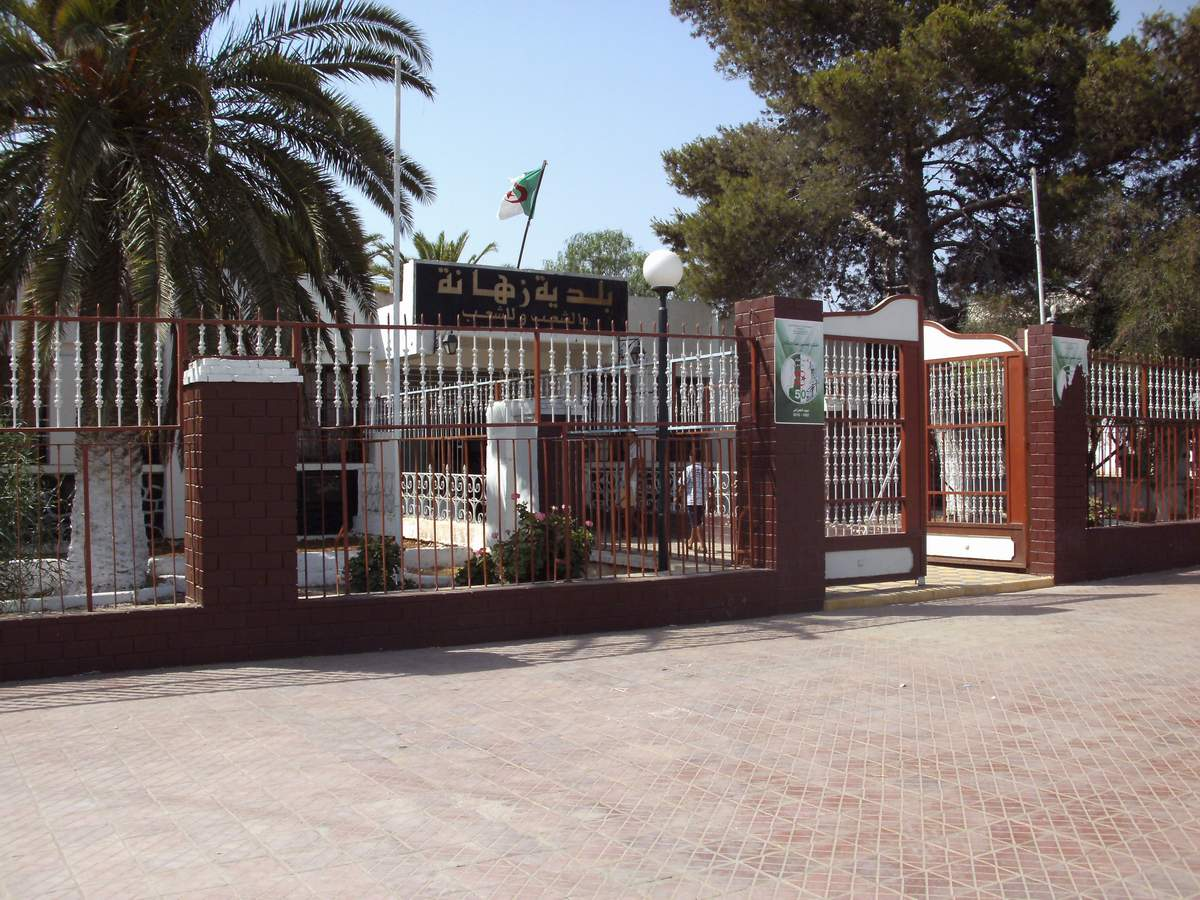

- Country: Algeria
- Province: Mascara Province

Population (1998)
  - Total: 18,839
- Time zone: UTC+1 (CET)

Zahana is a town and commune in Mascara Province, Algeria. According to the 1998 census it has a population of 18,839.

== Notable people ==
- Ahmed Zabana
