= Island of Limacos =

Algerian islet near the North African coast

Native name: Île de Rachgoun (French) جزيرة رشقون (Arabic)
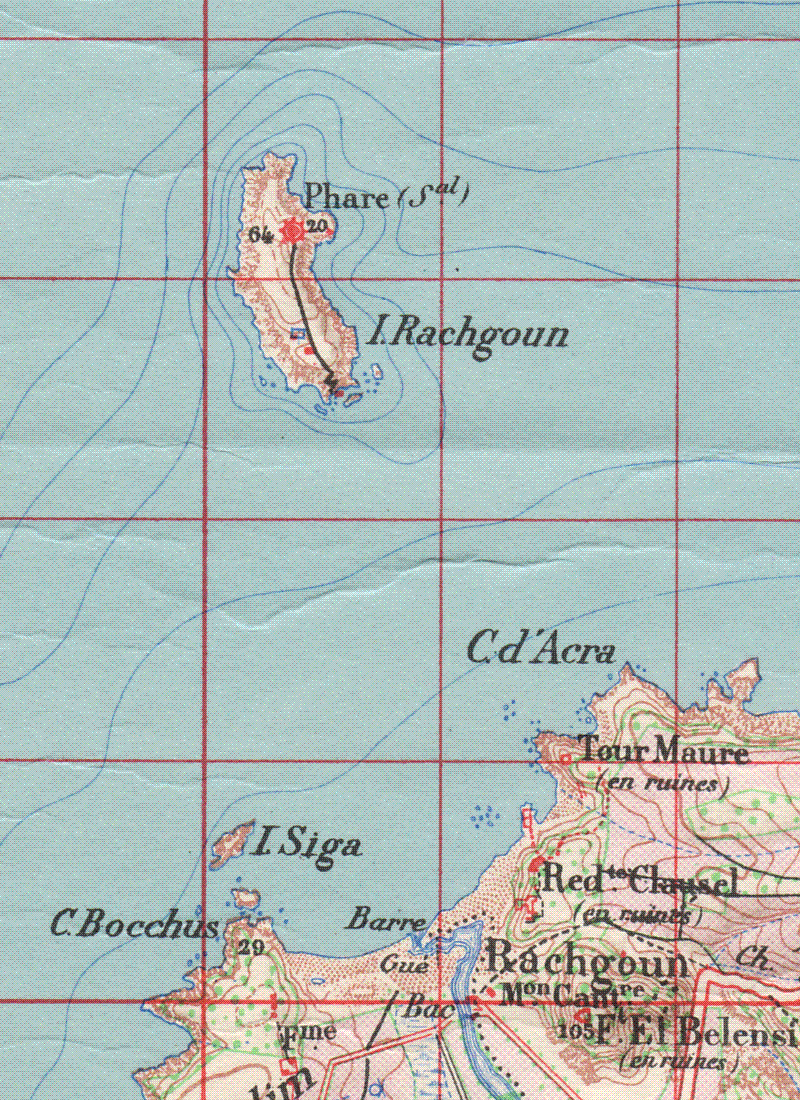
- Limacos or Rachgoun Island, off the coast of Algeria
- Interactive map of Island of Limacos

Geography
- Coordinates: 35°19′18″N 1°28′48″W
- Area: 66 ha (160 acres)

Administration
- Algeria
- Wilayah: Aïn Témouchent

Demographics
- Population: Uninhabited

Ramsar Wetland
- Official name: Ile de Rachgoun
- Designated: 5 June 2011
- Reference no.: 1961

The Island of Limacos ("slugs") or Island of Caracoles ("snails"), known in Spanish in the 16th century as Risgol and in French as Île de Rachgoun (Arabic: جزيرة رشقون, romanized: Jazira Rashqūn) is an Algerian islet located near the North African coast. It has an area of about 66 hectares (160 acres) and it is uninhabited. It is located in front of the mouth of the Tafna River, where the town of Rashgun is located. It is approximately halfway between Oran and the border between Algeria and Morocco. It was literarily described, along with other islets on the Maghreb coast, by the writer Pedro Mata as "one of those sea monsters sentinel that deflower the surface of the sea at various points" in his 1856 work Los moros del Riff o el presidiario de las Alhucemas. The island has been protected as a Ramsar site since 2001.

== Geography ==
The island of Limacos or Rachgoun is located four kilometers from the African coast, in front of the mouth of the Tafna River, which forms a bay bounded by Cape Acra to the east and Cape Bocchus to the west. The island is of volcanic origin, and is composed of basaltic rocks and Pliocene sandstones in the south.

It has a typically Mediterranean semi-arid climate, alternating between a rainy season in winter and a dry season in summer. The lack of rainfall (300–500 mm/year) is the consequence of a "shadow" effect caused by the Moroccan mountains of the Atlas and the Rif to the west and the massif systems of the Spanish southeast to the northwest, which prevent the passage of winds and cloud formations from Atlantic storms.

== Fauna ==
The island of Limacos or Rachgoun is uninhabited and free of direct anthropogenic pressure. It is situated on the main bird migration route of the western part of the Algerian coast. It is a refuge and nesting area for some species of birds that migrate between Eurasia and Africa, such as Audouin's gulls and Eleonora's falcons. It is also one of the places where Mediterranean monk seals may be found. Since 2011 it has been one of Algeria's Ramsar sites. The island has been designated an Important Bird Area (IBA) by BirdLife International because of its colony of Audouin's gulls.

== History ==
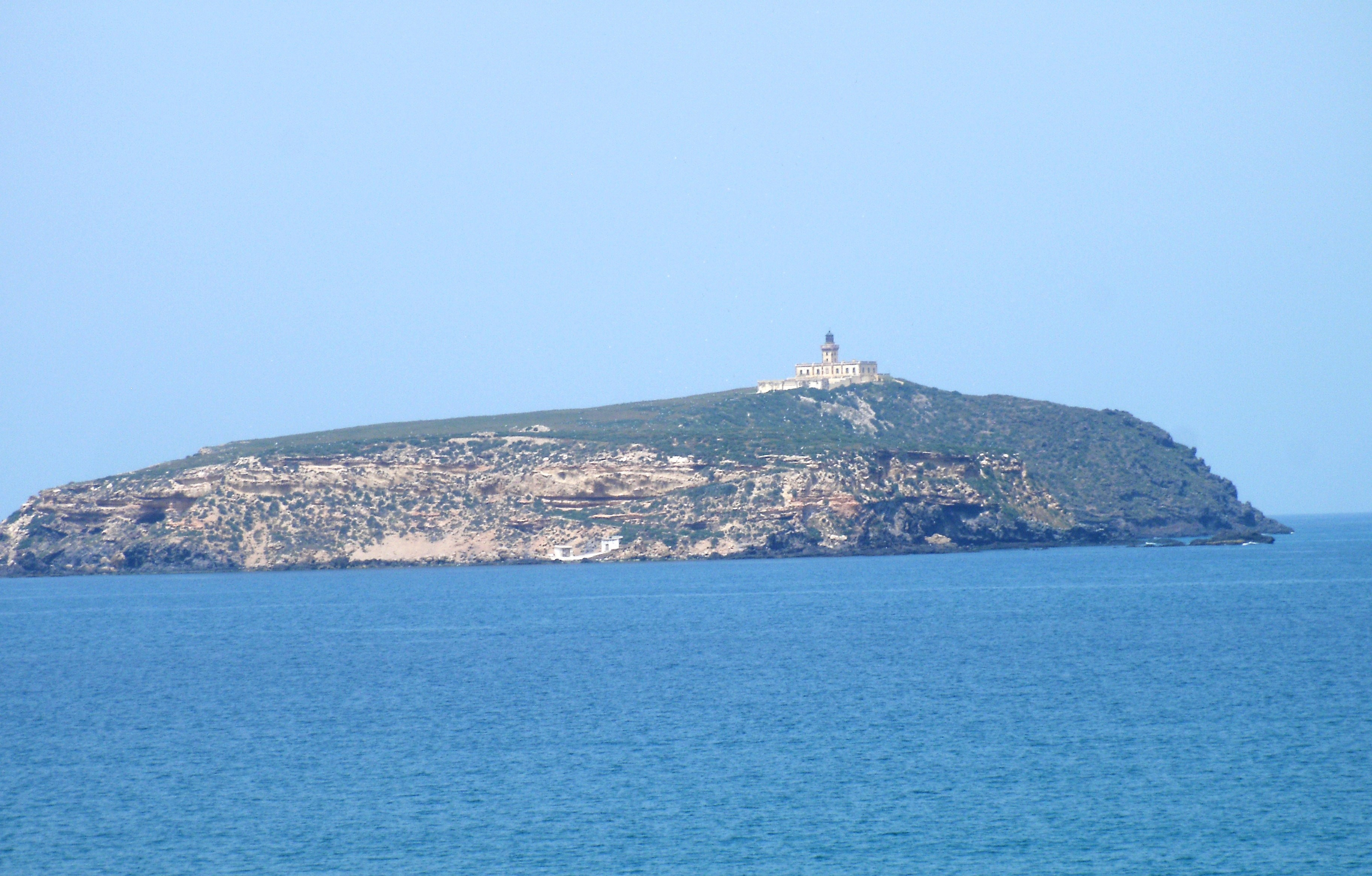
Island view

It has been mentioned as a possible permanent Phoenician settlement despite its small size and apparent lack of subsistence resources.

Excavations in 1954 uncovered a small Punic settlement and burial place. The settlement, located at the island’s southern tip, consisted of row houses built mainly from rubble stone and clay, with benches and dormer windows. Unfired brick was uncommon because clay had to be imported from the mainland. The “lighthouse burial place” contained both cremation and inhumation burials with archaic Punic grave goods dating mainly to the 7th century BCE. The pottery and other artifacts indicate contacts with Phoenician settlements in Iberia, while weapons, silver jewelry, and abundant handmade ceramics were also common. Especially the pottery highlight that Rachgoun was more closely connected to the Strait Circle than to the Carthaginian culture. Children were buried in natural cavities with their heads covered by header blocks. The site was occupied from the late 8th to the mid-6th century BCE.

In 931, the island became the refuge and stronghold of the Idrisi al-Hasan ben Abi-l-Ays. The Umayyad fleet of the recently proclaimed caliph of al-Andalus Abd al-Rahman III was sent —mainly from the port of Pechina— by him to harass the Idrisi and surround the island. However, this fleet could not continue with the harassing operations of the island and had to return to the Andalusian port in the autumn of 932.

It appears described in Derrotero de las costas de España en el Mediterráneo: y su correponido de Africa para inteligencia y uso de las cartas esféricas, by Vicente Tofiño de San Miguel, director of the marine guard companies, published in 1787:

At N. 50° E. 3 miles from this Cape is the Island of Limacos or Caracoles, of medium height, lying NS. a mile long and distant from land i the same distance. The small boats that go to load Tremecen bottom to the S. of the Island, although they recently sheltered, mooring to it with Cabo, and anchoring outside for 12 to 14 fathoms hard and somewhat dirty bottom, due to the great consistency of the bottom. that stays with the anchors, lacking the moorings and orinques at the time of setting sail. To the SE part. from the Island is the river of Tremecen with little water: between the Island and the river is an Islet the height of the hull of a Ship stretched from E W. the distance of a cable. Between him and the coast, which will be twice the distance, Galeotas can anchor in good weather. Wheat, wax, hides and wool are loaded into the river. Two cables away from the E. part of the mouth is a high and steep mountain with a tower, from whose shore a reef extends to the N. the distance of 2 cables, and for which it becomes precise when coming from lift dock the Isla de Caracoles.

— Tofiño de San Miguel, 1787

Limacos is located a hundred kilometers west of the former Spanish domains of Oran and Mazalquivir —sold to the Ottomans in 1791 by King Carlos IV— and there are mentions that it could also have been a possession of Spain in the past, but was abandoned by it sometime between the 18th and 19th centuries.

The island was occupied in October 1835 by the French army, in the context of its fight against Abd al-Qádir, opposed to the French penetration in Algeria, with the aim of serving as a coastal surveillance point as well as hindering the supply of arms and ammunition to the anti-French rebels. Limacos has also been mentioned as a possible frequent fishing ground for Spanish fishing boats throughout the 18th and early 20th centuries, the latter mainly coming from Tarifa, Málaga and Altea.

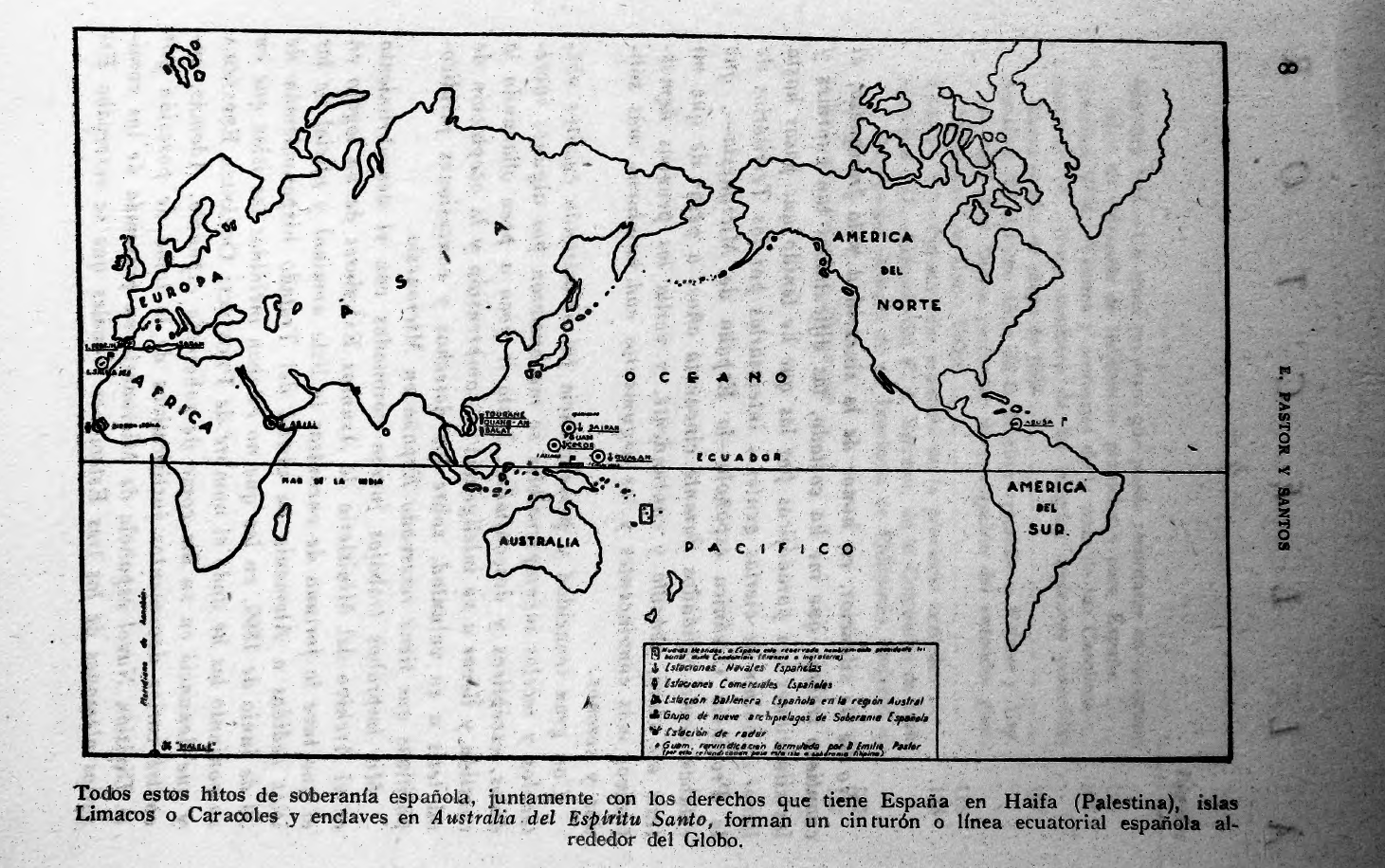
The Spanish rights over Limacos are listed in a 1950 map of "milestones of Spanish sovereignty" by Emilio Pastor y Santos.

There is a lighthouse at the north end built by the French in 1870.

Even though the island was abandoned, there are claims of Spanish sovereignty until the 20th century, when it was recognized as "Spanish" at the 1906 Algeciras Conference, as well as appearing in Spanish charters and documents during the 19th and 20th centuries. However, currently, the island is under Algerian sovereignty and the claims and mentions of "Spanishness" of the island in official documents simply disappeared during the 20th century.

The island has been protected as a Ramsar site since 2001.
