= Malich-e Kuchek =

Malich-e Kuchek ملچ كوچك
- Village
- Location within Iran
- Coordinates: 31°07′21″N 48°45′33″E
- Country: Iran
- Province: Khuzestan
- County: Karun
- Bakhsh: Central
- Rural District: Qaleh Chenan

Population (2006)
  - Total: 23
- Time zone: UTC+3:30 (IRST)
  - Summer (DST): UTC+4:30 (IRDT)

Malich-e Kuchek (Persian: ملچ كوچك, also Romanized as Malīch-e Kūchek and Meleych-e Kūchek; also known as Malaché Dow and Malīch) is a village in Qaleh Chenan Rural District, in the Central District of Karun County, Khuzestan Province, Iran. At the 2006 census, its population was 23, in 4 families.
