= Ouled Boudjemaa =

- Location within Aïn Témouchent province
- Coordinates: 35°28′23″N 1°11′33″W
- Country: Algeria
- Province: Aïn Témouchent

Area
  - Total: 81.66 km^{2} (31.53 sq mi)

Population (2010)
  - Total: 6,228
  - Density: 76.27/km^{2} (197.5/sq mi)
- Time zone: UTC+1 (West Africa Time)

Ouled Boudjemaa is a municipality in north-western Algeria.
