= Aïn Témouchent =

Aïn Témouchent عين تموشنت
- City
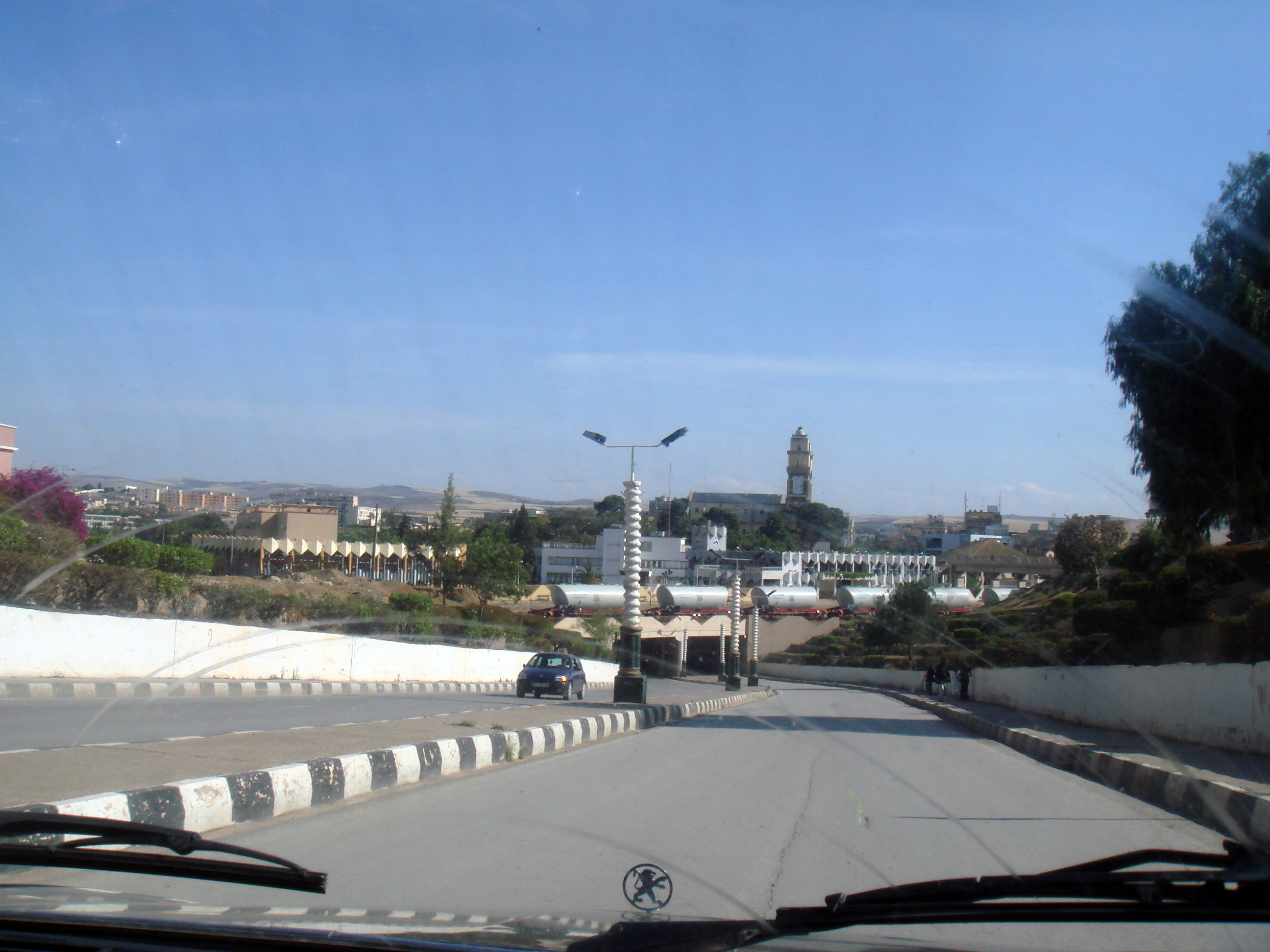
- Aïn Témouchent

- Location of Aïn Témouchent, Algeria within Aïn Témouchent Province

- Location of Aïn Témouchent within Algeria
- Coordinates: 35°18′N 1°08′W
- Country: Algeria
- Province: Aïn Témouchent
- District: Aïn Témouchent District

Government
  - PMA Seats: 11

Area
  - Total: 78.93 km^{2} (30.48 sq mi)
- Elevation: 296 m (971 ft)

Population (2010)
  - Total: 75,558
  - Density: 957.3/km^{2} (2,479/sq mi)
- Time zone: UTC+01 (CET)
- Postal code: 46000
- ONS code: 4601
- Climate: Csa

Aïn Témouchent (Arabic: عين تموشنت) is a city in north-western Algeria, it is the capital of Aïn Témouchent Province. Aïn Témouchent is located 72 km (or 44.7 miles) south-west of Oran, a city with which it is closely associated, and 63 km (or 39.1 miles) west of Sidi Bel Abbès. Known as "la Florissante", it is set in a narrow, fertile basaltic valley amid vineyards and orchards. As of the 2010 census, the town had a population of 75,558.

== History ==
The town was founded in 1851 by Spanish immigrants, who built on what had been the site of Roman Albulae and Arab Ksar ibn Senar. It was made the capital of the local subprefecture in 1955, and then the capital of the wilaya Aïn Témouchent in 1983. Prior to the end of colonization, the region was a large producer of wine.

In 1999, the town was devastated by a large earthquake. A loan of 83.5 million USD granted by the World Bank to the Algerian government enabled the rapid reconstruction of the city, among the best developed in Algeria: a new city, a hospital, a one-hectare public garden, were built and inaugurated in December 2003.

== Population over time ==
Historical population
Year	Pop.	±%
1901	7,000	—
1948	20,800	+197.1%
1954	25,200	+21.2%
1966	30,500	+21.0%
1977	29,800	−2.3%
1987	47,500	+59.4%
1998	55,200	+16.2%
Source: Populstat
