= Aïn Tolba =

- Location within Algeria
- Coordinates: 35°14′54″N 1°14′56″W
- Country: Algeria
- Province: Aïn Témouchent

Area
  - Total: 64.29 km^{2} (24.82 sq mi)

Population (2010)
  - Total: 12,933
- Time zone: UTC+1 (West Africa Time)

Aïn Tolba is a municipality in northwestern Algeria. Per the 2008 census, there was a population density of 192.1/km², composed of a population of 12,485 in an area of 65 km². The estimated population in 2010 was of 12,933.
