= Oued Sabah =

- Location within Aïn Témouchent province
- Coordinates: 35°22′21″N 0°48′41″W
- Country: Algeria
- Province: Aïn Témouchent

Area
  - Total: 222.2 km^{2} (85.8 sq mi)

Population (2010)
  - Total: 10,905
  - Density: 49.08/km^{2} (127.1/sq mi)
- Time zone: UTC+1 (West Africa Time)

Oued Sabah is a municipality in northwestern Algeria.
