= Sidi Ouriache =

- Location within Aïn Témouchent province

- Location within Algeria
- Coordinates: 35°11′20″N 1°30′23″W
- Country: Algeria
- Province: Aïn Témouchent

Area
  - Total: 64.21 km^{2} (24.79 sq mi)

Population (2010)
  - Total: 6,082
  - Density: 94.72/km^{2} (245.3/sq mi)
- Time zone: UTC+1 (West Africa Time)

Sidi Ouriache is a commune in Aïn Témouchent Province, north-western Algeria.
