= El Emir Abdelkader, Aïn Témouchent =

El Emir Abdelkader
- Nickname: La Plâtrière
- Location within Aïn Témouchent province
- Coordinates: 35°13′28″N 1°24′12″W
- Country: Algeria
- Province: Aïn Témouchent

Area
  - Total: 46.14 km^{2} (17.81 sq mi)

Population (2010)
  - Total: 4,554
  - Density: 98.70/km^{2} (255.6/sq mi)
- Time zone: UTC+1 (West Africa Time)

El Emir Abdelkader is a municipality in northwestern Algeria.
