= Aïn Kihal =

- Municipality
- Location of Aïn Kihal within Aïn Témouchent Province
- Coordinates: 35°12′16″N 1°11′46″W
- Country: Algeria
- Province: Aïn Témouchent

Population (2010)
  - Total: 9,589
- Time zone: UTC+1 (West Africa Time)

Aïn Kihal is a municipality in northwestern Algeria.
