= Hassasna =

- Location of Hassasna within Aïn Témouchent province
- Coordinates: 35°16′20″N 0°59′14″W
- Country: Algeria
- Province: Aïn Témouchent

Area
  - Total: 85.61 km^{2} (33.05 sq mi)

Population (2010)
  - Total: 4,184
  - Density: 48.87/km^{2} (126.6/sq mi)
- Time zone: UTC+1 (West Africa Time)

Hassasna is a municipality in northwestern Algeria.
