= Sidi Ben Adda =

- Location within Aïn Témouchent province
- Coordinates: 35°18′N 1°11′W
- Country: Algeria
- Province: Aïn Témouchent

Area
  - Total: 72.88 km^{2} (28.14 sq mi)

Population (2010)
  - Total: 14,086
  - Density: 193.3/km^{2} (500.6/sq mi)
- Time zone: UTC+1 (West Africa Time)

Sidi Ben Adda is a municipality in north-western Algeria.
