= Aoubellil =

- Location within Algeria
- Coordinates: 35°08′N 0°59′W
- Country: Algeria
- Province: Aïn Témouchent

Area
  - Total: 80.18 km^{2} (30.96 sq mi)

Population (2010)
  - Total: 4,894
- Time zone: UTC+1 (West Africa Time)

Aoubellil is a municipality in northwestern Algeria.
