= Al-Malih =

Al-Malih المالحة
- Village
- Location in Syria
- Coordinates: 34°59′19″N 37°1′9″E
- Country: Syria
- Governorate: Hama
- District: Salamiyah
- Subdistrict: Salamiyah

Population (2004)
  - Total: 233
- Time zone: UTC+3 (AST)
- City Qrya Pcode: C3230

Al-Maliha (Arabic: المالحة) is a Syrian village located in Salamiyah Subdistrict in Salamiyah District, Hama. According to the Syria Central Bureau of Statistics (CBS), al-Malih had a population of 233 in the 2004 census.
