= Maleh (surname) =

Maleh and el Maleh are Arabic-language surnames. Notable people with the surnames include:

- Edmond Amran El Maleh (1917–2010), Moroccan Jewish writer
- Gad Elmaleh (born 1971), Moroccan-Canadian stand-up comedian and actor
- Haitham al-Maleh (born 1931), Syrian human rights activist and judge
- Nabil Maleh (1936–2016), Syrian film director, screenwriter, producer, painter, and poet
- Nadja Maleh (born 1972, Austrian actress, singer, cabaret artist, and director
- Youssef Maleh (born 1998), Italian footballer
