= El Amria =

- Location of El Amria within Aïn Témouchent province

- Location within Algeria
- Coordinates: 35°32′N 1°01′W
- Country: Algeria
- Province: Aïn Témouchent

Area
  - Total: 90.49 km^{2} (34.94 sq mi)

Population (2010)
  - Total: 22,572
  - Density: 249.4/km^{2} (646.1/sq mi)
- Time zone: UTC+1 (West Africa Time)

El Amria is a town in the Aïn Témouchent province in northwestern Algeria.
