= Sidi Safi =

- Location within Aïn Témouchent province
- Coordinates: 35°17′N 1°18′W
- Country: Algeria
- Province: Aïn Témouchent

Area
  - Total: 65.52 km^{2} (25.30 sq mi)

Population (2010)
  - Total: 7,782
  - Density: 118.8/km^{2} (307.6/sq mi)
- Time zone: UTC+1 (West Africa Time)

Sidi Safi is a municipality in north-western Algeria.

It includes the ruins of the Punic and Roman settlement Camarata.
