= Tamzoura =

- Location of Tamzoura within Aïn Témouchent province
- Coordinates: 35°25′N 0°39′W
- Country: Algeria
- Province: Aïn Témouchent

Area
  - Total: 229.06 km^{2} (88.44 sq mi)
- Highest elevation: 938 m (3,077 ft)
- Lowest elevation: 77 m (253 ft)

Population (2010)
  - Total: 9,944
  - Density: 43.41/km^{2} (112.4/sq mi)
- Time zone: UTC+1 (West Africa Time)
- 043: 46240

Tamzoura is a municipality in north-western Algeria.
