= Bou Zedjar =

- Location of Bou Zedjar within Aïn Témouchent province
- Coordinates: 35°24′28″N 1°10′01″W
- Country: Algeria
- Province: Aïn Témouchent

Area
  - Total: 54.86 km^{2} (21.18 sq mi)

Population (2010)
  - Total: 4,545
- Time zone: UTC+1 (West Africa Time)

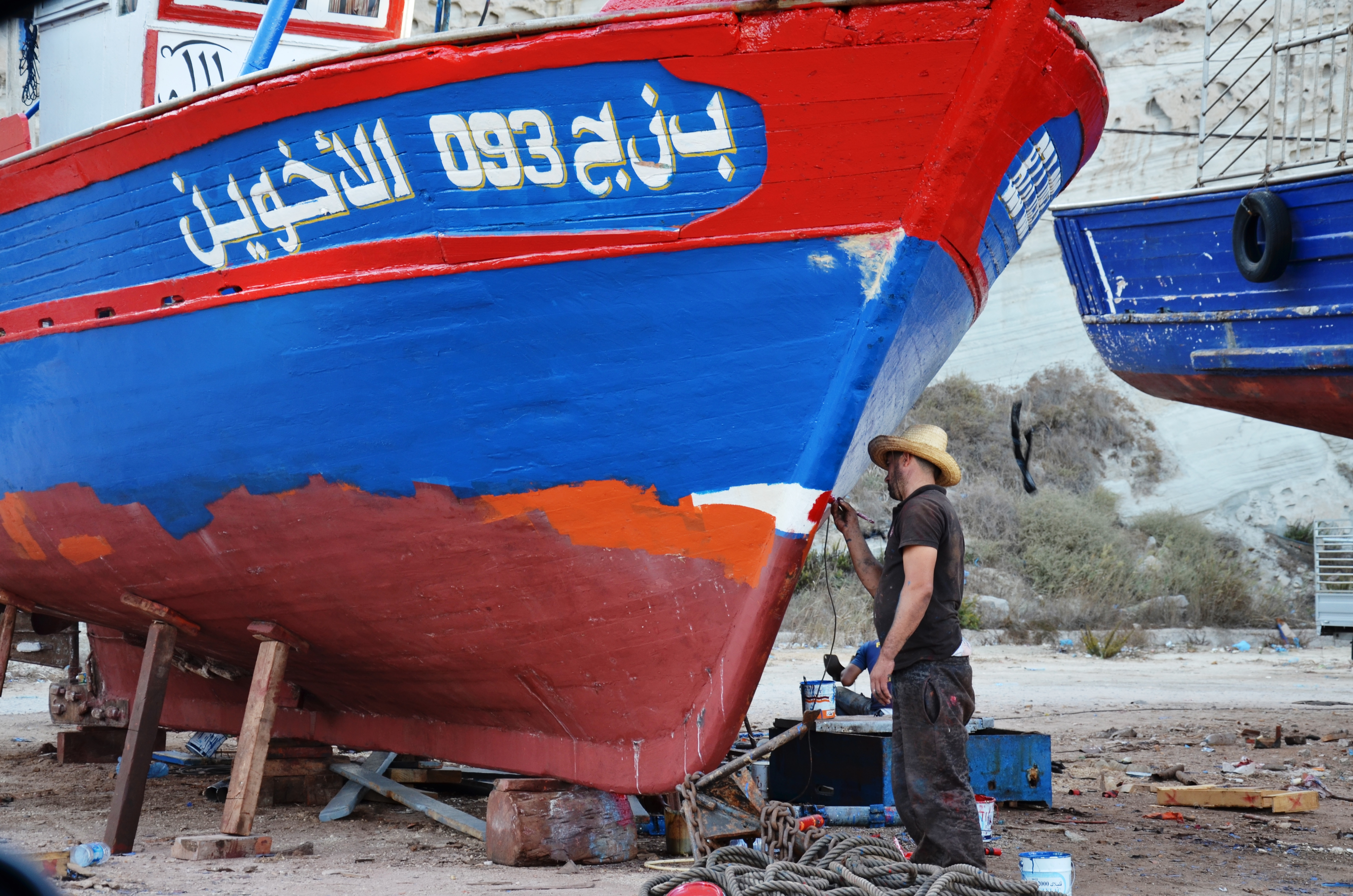
Man painting a boat in Bou Zedjar.

Bou Zedjar is a municipality in northwestern Algeria.
