= El Messaid =

- Location within Aïn Témouchent province
- Coordinates: 35°32′31″N 1°07′19″W
- Country: Algeria
- Province: Aïn Témouchent

Area
  - Total: 90.88 km^{2} (35.09 sq mi)

Population (2010)
  - Total: 4,519
  - Density: 49.72/km^{2} (128.8/sq mi)
- Time zone: UTC+1 (West Africa Time)

El Messaid is a municipality in northwestern Algeria.
