= Giuseppe Averani =

Italian jurist and naturalist

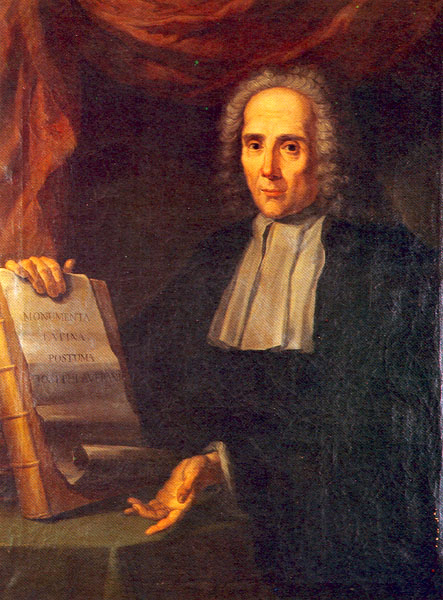
Giuseppe Averani

Giuseppe Averani FRS or Averanus (March 20, 1662, Pisa – August 24, 1738, Florence) was an Italian jurist and naturalist.

== Biography ==
The son of a mathematician, he studied arts and law at the University of Pisa. His brother Benedetto Averani (1645-1707) was a prominent bibliophile and philologist of Florence, teaching Greek language at the University of Pisa.

In 1685, Giuseppe was appointed to a professorship of civil law at Pisa, a post he held until his death. As a celebrated legal teachers in Tuscany, his pupils included leading figures of the Italian Enlightenment such as P. Neri, B. Tanucci, A. Tavanti and G.G. De Soria, as well as several traveling European princes.

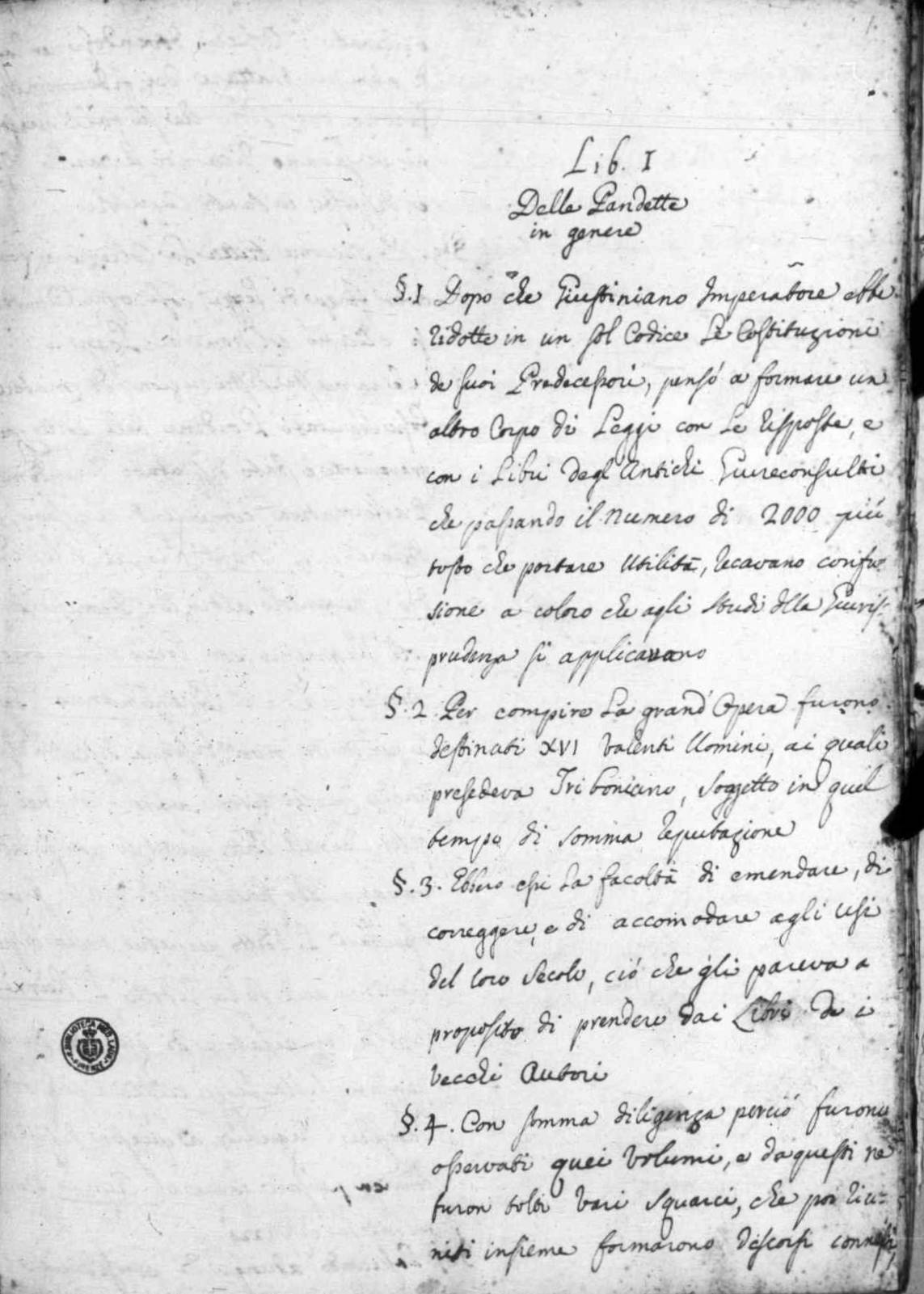
Historia Pandectarum Pisanarum, 17th-century manuscript. Florence, Biblioteca Medicea Laurenziana, Fondo Ashburnham.

Together with Aulisio and Gravina, Averani was among the founders of Neohumanism in Italy. He reformed Pisan legal studies on a Humanist basis, setting an example to other Italian universities and forming the intellectual basis for the reforms of Tuscan Enlightenment statesmen in the second half of the 18th century. His principal work are the Interpretationes iuris civilis, analyses of fragments of the Digests based on Cujas.

Apart from law, Averani was active in theology, astronomy, philosophy and above all experimental physics. The results of his experiments, such as on light, odours, the electricity of bodies and with Robert Boyle's air pump, were well received by contemporaries, including Newton. A member of scientific academies including the Crusca and the Royal Society, Averani founded the Accademia degli Oppressi (Academy of the Oppressed) to hold discussions on physics.

== Works ==
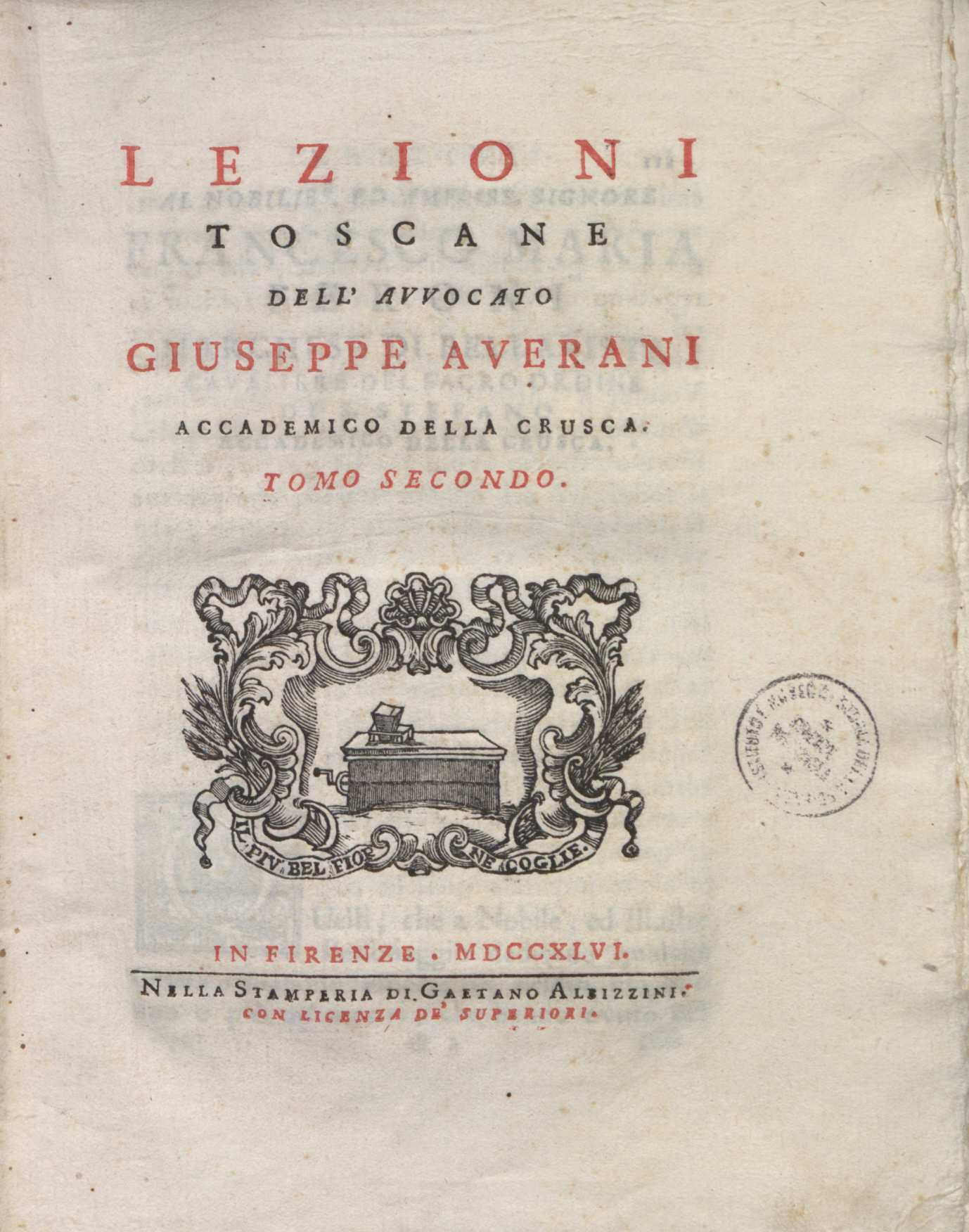
Lezioni toscane, vol. 2, 1746

- Lezioni toscane (in Italian). Vol. 2. Florence: Gaetano Albizzini. 1744.
  - Lezioni toscane (in Italian). Vol. 2. Florence: Gaetano Albizzini. 1746.
  - Lezioni toscane (in Italian). Vol. 3. Florence: Gaetano Albizzini. 1761.

=== Manuscripts ===
- Historia Pandectarum Pisanarum (17th century) (in Latin). Florence, Biblioteca Medicea Laurenziana, Fondo Ashburnham, Ashb. 1332 (antea 1257).
