= Laar Museum and Molvi Haji Ahmed Mallah Library =

- لاڙ ميوزيم ۽ مولوي حاجي احمد ملاھ لائبريري
- Established: 1980; 45 years ago
- Location: Main Karachi Road (opposite the Deputy Commissioner's Office), Badin, Sindh, Pakistan
- Coordinates: 24.6552°N 68.8284°E
- Type: History museum
- Collections: Indus-Valley pottery, Quranic manuscripts (Persian, Arabic, Sindhi), historical photographs
- Founder: Shaikh Muhammad Soomar

The Laar Museum and Molvi Haji Ahmed Mallah Library is a historic building located on the main Karachi road opposite the deputy commissioner's office in Badin, Sindh, Pakistan.

== History ==
The two-story building was established in 1980 through the efforts of Shaikh Muhammad Soomar, a historian, poet, and anthropologist known for his work in preserving artifacts from the lower Sindh regions, such as Badin, Tando Muhammad Khan, and Thatta. The museum received financial support from former Prime Minister Muhammad Khan Junejo, who donated Rs 0.5 million, and former Governor of Sindh Kamaluddin Azfar, who contributed Rs 1 million to support Shaikh Soomar's preservation efforts.

== Collections ==
The museum once housed a diverse collection of artifacts significant to Sindh's cultural heritage, including pottery from the Indus Valley Civilization, hand-written Quranic manuscripts in Persian, Arabic, and Sindhi, and historical photographs of various locations. However, the collection was compromised when the museum space was used to store relief goods during a flood, resulting in the displacement and damage of many items.

== Architecture ==
The building features an exterior with expansive green lawns and grand marble steps, decorated with milk white tiles showcasing intricate navy blue floral designs. In contrast, the interior of the museum is in a state of neglect, with artifacts covered in dust and cobwebs.
