= Ouled Kihal =

- Location within Aïn Témouchent province
- Coordinates: 35°22′07″N 1°14′08″W
- Country: Algeria
- Province: Aïn Témouchent

Area
  - Total: 33.08 km^{2} (12.77 sq mi)

Population (2010)
  - Total: 3,601
  - Density: 108.9/km^{2} (281.9/sq mi)
- Time zone: UTC+1 (West Africa Time)

Ouled Kihal is a municipality in north-western Algeria.
