= Chentouf =

Chentout
- Location of Chentout within Aïn Témouchent province
- Coordinates: 35°18′13″N 1°01′46″W
- Country: Algeria
- Province: Aïn Témouchent

Area
  - Total: 57.63 km^{2} (22.25 sq mi)

Population (2010)
  - Total: 2,940
- Time zone: UTC+1 (West Africa Time)

Chentout is a municipality in northwestern Algeria.
