= Ammar Mallah =

Algerian Military officer and writer (born 1938)

- Born: 15 February 1938 (age 88); El Madher, Batna Province, Algeria

Mohamed Saleh Mallah (born 15 February 1938; Arabic: محمد الصالح ملاح), known as Ammar Mallah (also spelled Amar Mallah), is an Algerian military officer and writer. He is considered one of the few fighters of the Algerian War to have published several works and books on the revolution and the post-revolution period, most notably The 14 December 1967 Movement of Officers of the People's National Army.

== Career ==
Ammar Mallah was born on 15 February 1938 in El Madher, in the Batna Province. He joined the National Liberation Army immediately after the student strike in May 1956.

He fought mainly in his village, Aïn Ou Ksir (El Madher, in Jebel Bouarif), and rose through the ranks in the field. He was promoted to Wilaya I assembly leader responsible for intelligence and communications in January 1962. After independence in 1962, he chose to remain on active duty in the People's National Army.

He held several commands within the People's National Army, including commander of the Fifth Military Region (Batna) between 1962 and 1964 and commander of the Fourth Military Region (Ouargla) between 1964 and 1965.

From 1965 to 1967, he studied command and general staff subjects at the Frunze Military Academy in Moscow. He then joined the General Staff headquarters in Algiers, where he headed the Organization and Mobilization Office of the General Staff of the People's National Army.

He participated in the 14 December 1967 movement against President Houari Boumediene.

== Attempt to assassinate Boumediene ==
In April 1968, Ammar was the field commander of a failed coup against President Houari Boumediene, organized under the supervision of Colonel Tahir Zubairi. He was arrested and tried by the Revolutionary Court of Oran, which sentenced him to death in 1969. After 11 years in prison, he was pardoned and released by President Chadli Bendjedid in April 1979.

Since 1990, Commander Ammar Mallah has been a member of the National Organization of Mujahideen and president of the Association of the First of November 1954.

In January 2010, President Abdelaziz Bouteflika appointed Major Ammar El-Mallah to the Algerian National Assembly as part of the presidential third.

== Works ==
He has written several books on the history of the Algerian revolution:

- The 14 December 1967 Movement of Officers of the People's National Army (ḥarakat 14 disambir 1967 li-ḍubbāṭ al-jaysh al-waṭanī al-shaʿbī), 2004.
- Facts and Data about the Liberation Revolution in the Aurès (waqāʾiʿ wa-ḥaqāʾiq ʿan al-thawra al-taḥrīriyya bi-l-Awrās), 2003.
- Decisive Stations in the Revolution of 1 November 1954 (maḥaṭṭāt ḥāsima fī thawrat awwal Nūfimbir 1954), 2012.
- Leaders of the National Liberation Army – Wilaya I – Part One (qādat jaysh al-taḥrīr al-waṭanī), 2012.
- Leaders of the National Liberation Army – Wilaya I – Part Two (qādat jaysh al-taḥrīr al-waṭanī), 2012.
- Leaders of the National Liberation Army – Wilaya I – Part Three (qādat jaysh al-taḥrīr al-waṭanī), 2013.
- The First Historic Wilaya of the National Liberation Front and Army (al-wilāya al-ūlā al-tārīkhiyya li-jaysh wa-jabhat al-taḥrīr al-waṭanī), 2017.
