= Aïn El Arbaa =

- Municipality
- Location of Aïn El Arbaa within the Province of Aïn Témouchent

- Location of Aïn El Arbaa within Algeria
- Coordinates: 35°24′27″N 0°52′54″W
- Country: Algeria
- Province: Aïn Témouchent

Area
  - Total: 71.61 km^{2} (27.65 sq mi)

Population (2010)
  - Total: 15,683
- Time zone: UTC+1 (West Africa Time)

Aïn El Arbaa is a municipality in northwestern Algeria. It is in the Aïn Témouchent Province.
