= Aghlal =

- Commune
- Location of Aghlal within Aïn Témouchent Province

- Location of Aghlal within Algeria
- Coordinates: 35°12′N 1°04′W
- Country: Algeria
- Province: Aïn Témouchent

Area
  - Total: 131.2 km^{2} (50.7 sq mi)

Population (2010)
  - Total: 7,146
- Time zone: UTC+1 (West Africa Time)

Aghlal is a commune in northwestern Algeria. It is in the Aïn Témouchent Province.
