= Malich-e Bozorg =

Malich-e Bozorg ملچ بزرگ
- Village
- Location within Iran
- Coordinates: 31°08′37″N 48°47′09″E
- Country: Iran
- Province: Khuzestan
- County: Ahvaz
- Bakhsh: Central
- Rural District: Mosharrahat

Population (2006)
  - Total: 133
- Time zone: UTC+3:30 (IRST)
  - Summer (DST): UTC+4:30 (IRDT)

Malich-e Bozorg (Persian: ملچ بزرگ, also Romanized as Malīch-e Bozorg, Meleych Bozorg, and Meleych-e Bozorg; also known as Malaché Yek and Malīch) is a village in Mosharrahat Rural District, in the Central District of Ahvaz County, Khuzestan Province, Iran. At the 2006 census, its population was 133, in 24 families.
