= Hassi El Ghella =

- Location within Aïn Témouchent province
- Coordinates: 35°27′N 1°03′W
- Country: Algeria
- Province: Aïn Témouchent

Area
  - Total: 59.12 km^{2} (22.83 sq mi)

Population (2010)
  - Total: 12,118
  - Density: 205.0/km^{2} (530.9/sq mi)
- Time zone: UTC+1 (West Africa Time)

Hassi El Ghella is a municipality in northwestern Algeria.
