= Island of El Aouana =

Island of Algeria

- Interactive map of Island of El Aouana

Geography
- Coordinates: 36°47′07″N 5°36′30″E
- Area: 0.10 km^{2} (0.039 sq mi)

Administration
- Algeria
- City: Jijel

Demographics
- Population: 0

El Aouana Island, or the island of dreams are also called the island of the Mediterranean Sea, just 950 meters from the beach El Aouana mandate of Jijel.
