= Oulhaça El Gheraba =

Oulhaça El Gheraba Ulhasa
- Location of Oulhaça within Aïn Témouchent province
- Coordinates: 35°13′59″N 1°30′16″W
- Country: Algeria
- Province: Aïn Témouchent

Area
  - Total: 86.29 km^{2} (33.32 sq mi)

Population (2010)
  - Total: 15,972
  - Density: 185.1/km^{2} (479.4/sq mi)
- Time zone: UTC+1 (West Africa Time)

Oulhaça El Gheraba (English: Ulhasa) is a municipality in north-western Algeria.
