= Terga, Algeria =

Terga
- Location of Terga within Aïn Témouchent province
- Coordinates: 35°25′N 1°11′W
- Country: Algeria
- Province: Aïn Témouchent

Area
  - Total: 65.07 km^{2} (25.12 sq mi)

Population (2010)
  - Total: 32,308
  - Density: 496.5/km^{2} (1,286/sq mi)
- Time zone: UTC+1 (West Africa Time)

Terga is a municipality in north-western Algeria.
