= Sidi Boumedienne =

- Location within Aïn Témouchent province
- Coordinates: 35°21′15″N 0°53′35″W
- Country: Algeria
- Province: Aïn Témouchent

Area
  - Total: 49.12 km^{2} (18.97 sq mi)

Population (2010)
  - Total: 3,381
  - Density: 68.83/km^{2} (178.3/sq mi)
- Time zone: UTC+1 (West Africa Time)

Sidi Boumedienne is a municipality in north-western Algeria.
