= Palazzo dei Priori, Volterra =

Palazzo dei Priori
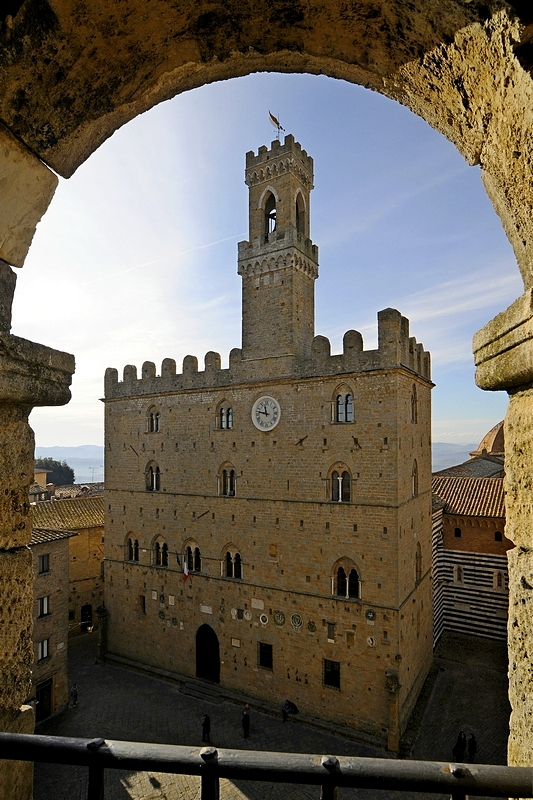
- Palazzo dei Priori in 2011
- Click on the map for a fullscreen view

General information
- Location: Volterra, Italy
- Coordinates: 43°24′06.55″N 10°51′34.09″E

The Palazzo dei Priori is a Gothic-style monumental civic building in the center of the town of Volterra, located on the Piazza dei Priori, also known as Piazza Maggiore. The imposing 13th-century stone building once the office of appointed town magistrates, still has offices of the local commune, including the communal council, for Volterra, province of Pisa, region of Tuscany, Italy.

== History and Description ==
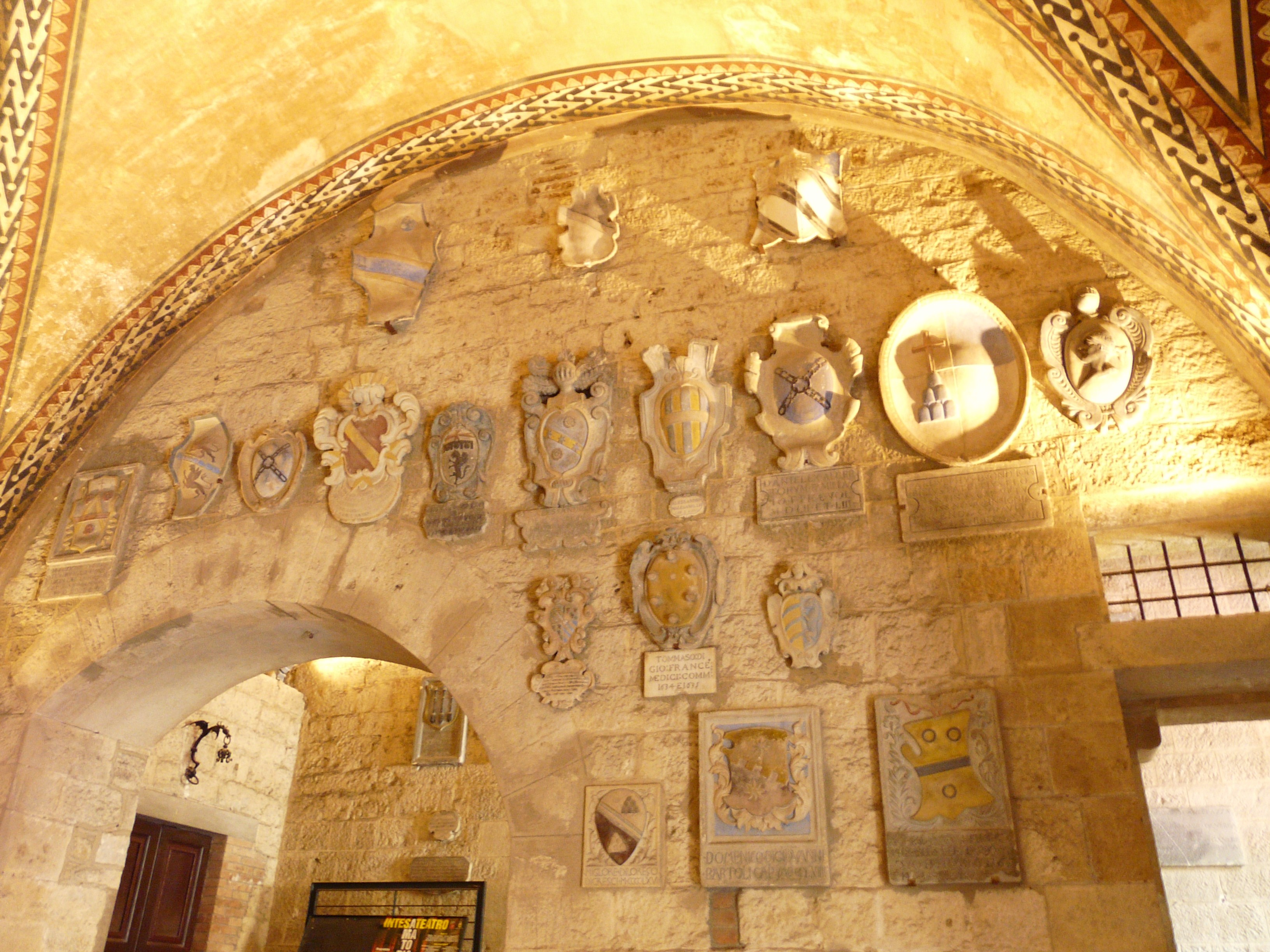
Inner courtyard

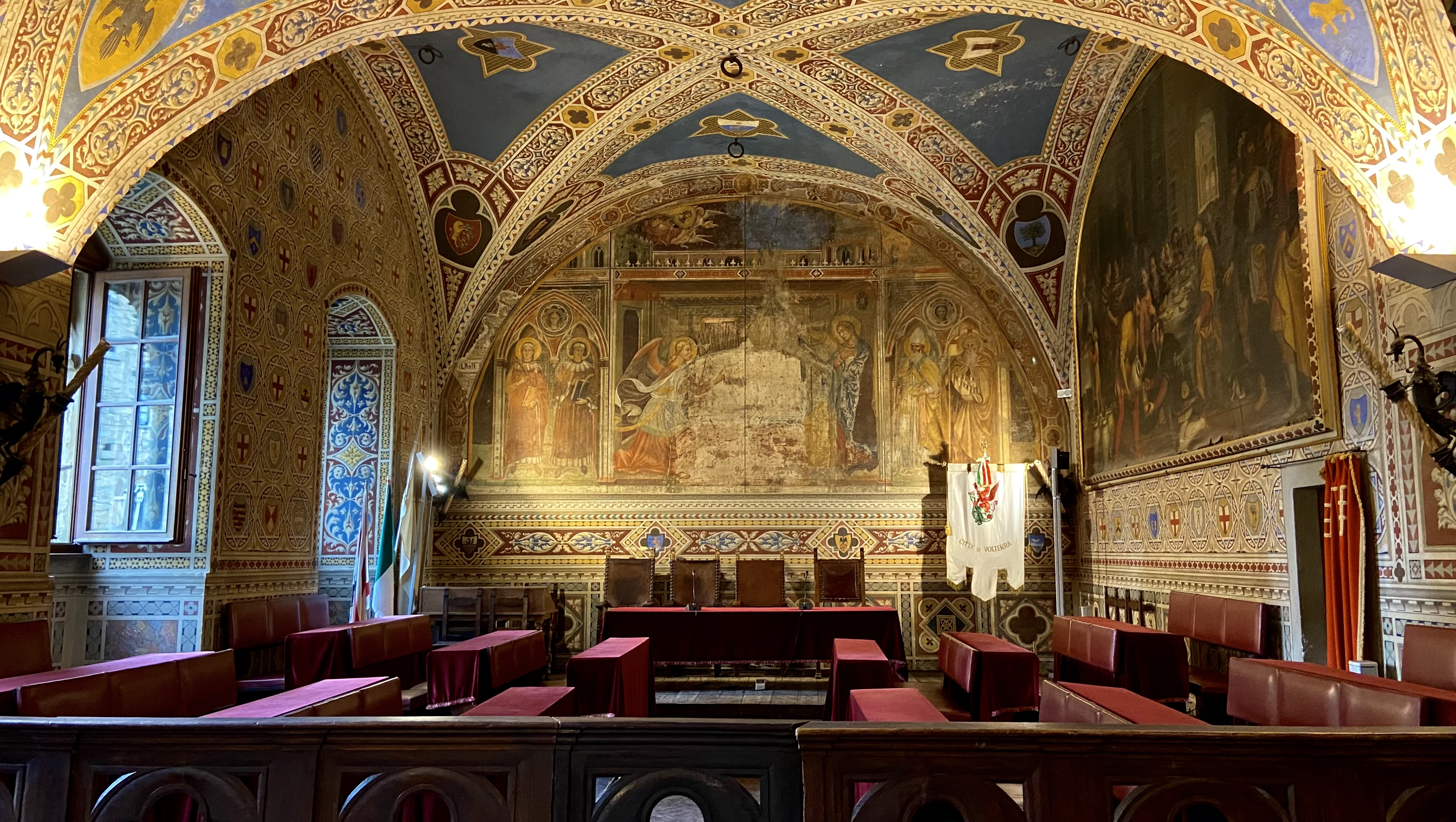
Frescoed Sala del Consiglio with Orcagna mural on far wall and Mascagni mural on right

This building, initially called Palazzo del Comune, was commissioned in 1208 by Ildebrando Pannocchieschi, Palatine Count of the Holy Roman Emperor. The design and construction is attributed to maestro Riccardo da Como; the first floor was completed in 1234, and the upper floors by 1257. Originally, it housed the town leaders, consisting of 24 elders (Anziani), which in 1283 were replaced by 18 Priors of the People (Priori del Popolo), and in 1289 by 12 Defenders of the People (Difensori del Popolo).

The stone facade and the tower likely did not receive its merlionated rooflines until the 16th century. The facade is now decorated with heraldic shields in stone and terracotta belonging to ruling families, often of the appointed Florentine officers after the town became part of the Duchy of Tuscany in 1472. The two lions on columns at the corners of the facade, representing the Marzocco of Florence, were added after this time. The northeast-facing facade is oddly asymmetric, with the entrance portal off to the left, the tower off to the right, and the five mullioned windows on the piano nobile, not matching the trios on subsequent levels. The tower was partially rebuilt after the earthquake of 1846.

Once the palace housed the local Civic museum and art gallery, but by the 19th century this museum was moved to the present site of Palazzo Minucci-Solaini. The main portal leads to a large atrium in the ground floor. In the stairs leading up to the next story (first floor), is a fresco depicting a Crucifixion with Saints (1490) by Pier Francesco Fiorentino. The first floor houses the Sala del Consiglio (Hall of the council). This large meeting hall is extensively frescoed with heraldic symbols, completed during a restoration in 1881. A large lunette still retains a partially damaged Annunciation (1398) painted by Jacopo di Cione Orcagna. The others were completed in 1881. The lunette to the right depicts a Wedding at Cana (1593) by Donato Mascagni. The upper floors were used as a residence by the magistrates.

The courtyard once contained a fresco titled Justice (1532) by a young Daniele Ricciarelli; it was detached in 1844 and is now in the town civic museum.

== Bibliografia ==
- Anna Padoa Rizzo (a cura di), Arte e committenza in Valdelsa e in Valdera, Florence, Octavo, 1997 ISBN 88-8030-104-7
- A. Augenti, Ottone il Grande e l'Europa. Volterra, da Ottone I all'Età comunale, Siena, Nuova Immagine, 2001
- M. Burresi - A. Caleca, Volterra d'oro e di pietra, Ospedaletto (Pi), Pacini Editor, 2006
