= Oued Berkeche =

- Location within Aïn Témouchent province
- Coordinates: 35°13′N 0°49′W
- Country: Algeria
- Province: Aïn Témouchent

Area
  - Total: 41.51 km^{2} (16.03 sq mi)

Population (2010)
  - Total: 4,343
  - Density: 104.6/km^{2} (271.0/sq mi)
- Time zone: UTC+1 (West Africa Time)

Oued Berkeche is a municipality in northwestern Algeria.
