= Béni Saf =

Beni Saf
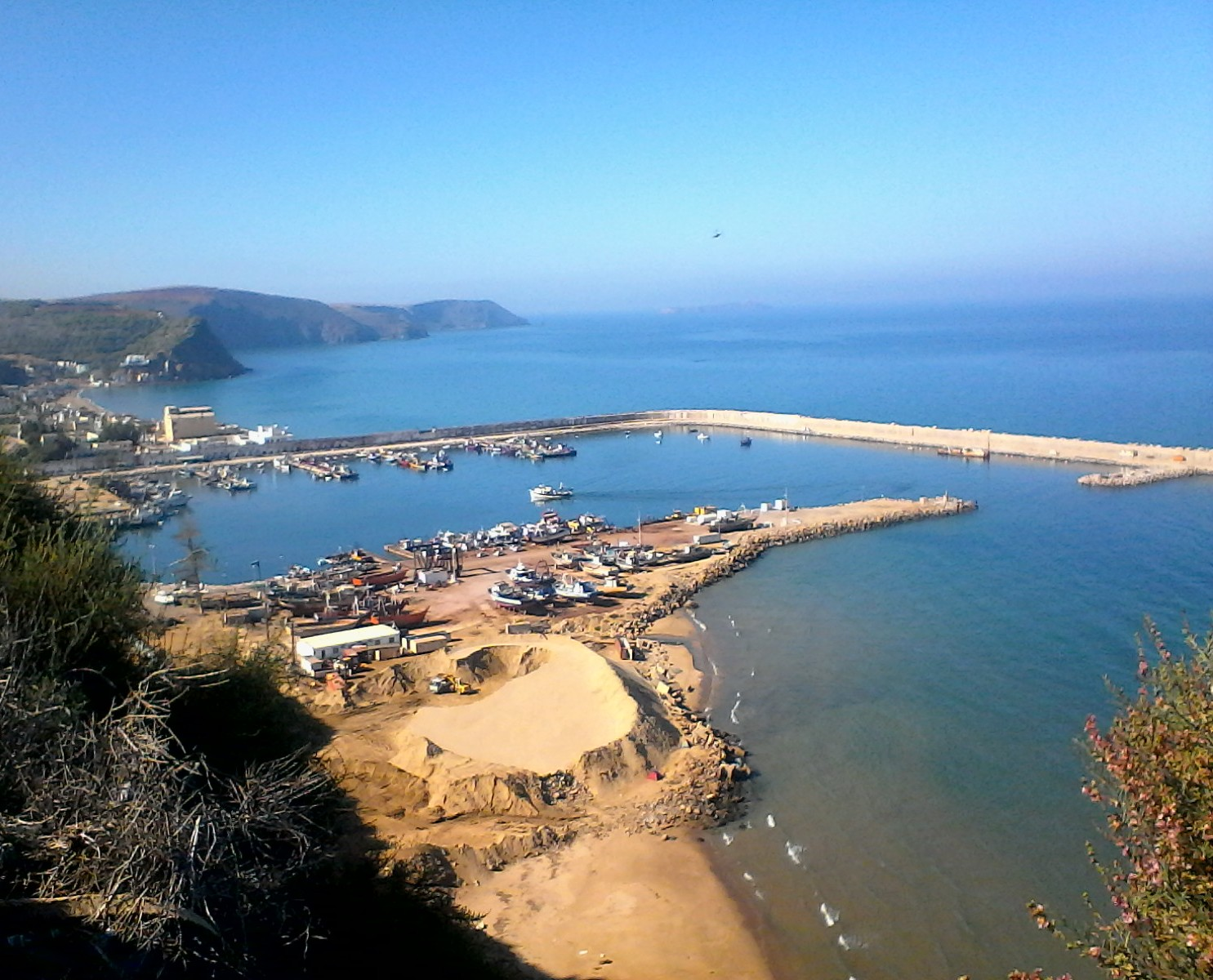
- Beni Saf port

- Location of Béni Saf within Aïn Témouchent province

- Location within Algeria
- Coordinates: 35°18′N 1°23′W
- Country: Algeria
- Province: Aïn Témouchent

Area
  - Total: 61.3 km^{2} (23.7 sq mi)

Population (2010)
  - Total: 43,802
- Time zone: UTC+1 (CET)

Beni Saf (Arabic: بني صاف) is a town in northwestern Algeria, about 80 kilometers southwest of Oran. The town was founded in 1876 as a shipping port for iron ore, which is mined just south of the town. Other products of the town include zinc, marble and onyx, and the fishing industry is extensive.

The Medgaz natural gas pipeline links Beni Saf to the Playa del Perdigal in Almería, Spain.

== Climate ==
Climate data for Beni Saf (1991-2020)
Month	Jan	Feb	Mar	Apr	May	Jun	Jul	Aug	Sep	Oct	Nov	Dec	Year
Record high °C (°F)	26.4 (79.5)	33.9 (93.0)	35.4 (95.7)	29.0 (84.2)	34.4 (93.9)	40.5 (104.9)	40.9 (105.6)	40.7 (105.3)	38.5 (101.3)	34.7 (94.5)	33.6 (92.5)	27.7 (81.9)	40.9 (105.6)
Daily mean °C (°F)	13.3 (55.9)	13.7 (56.7)	15.3 (59.5)	17.0 (62.6)	19.7 (67.5)	22.9 (73.2)	25.3 (77.5)	26.4 (79.5)	24.0 (75.2)	20.9 (69.6)	17.0 (62.6)	14.5 (58.1)	19.2 (66.5)
Mean daily minimum °C (°F)	10.2 (50.4)	10.5 (50.9)	12.0 (53.6)	13.7 (56.7)	16.3 (61.3)	19.5 (67.1)	22.0 (71.6)	23.2 (73.8)	20.9 (69.6)	17.7 (63.9)	13.9 (57.0)	11.4 (52.5)	15.9 (60.7)
Average precipitation mm (inches)	60.4 (2.38)	42.9 (1.69)	34.8 (1.37)	30.4 (1.20)	20.5 (0.81)	4.2 (0.17)	3.1 (0.12)	2.7 (0.11)	17.7 (0.70)	36.8 (1.45)	62.5 (2.46)	40.2 (1.58)	356.2 (14.04)
Average precipitation days (≥ 1 mm)	6.2	5.6	4.5	4.9	2.9	0.7	0.6	0.5	2.2	4.3	5.5	5.5	43.4

== Sources ==
- "Beni Saf". Store norske leksikon (in Norwegian).
