= Chaabet El Ham =

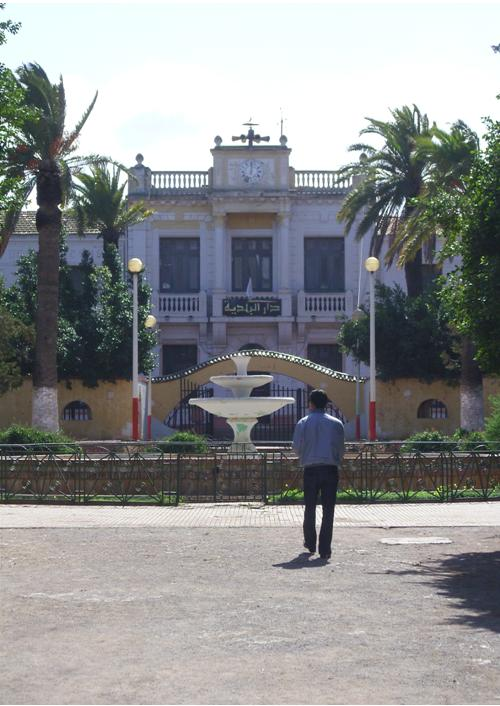

- Location of the commune within Aïn Témouchent province

- Location in Algeria
- Coordinates: 35°20′10″N 01°06′04″W
- Country: Algeria
- Province: Aïn Témouchent

Area
  - Total: 66.62 km^{2} (25.72 sq mi)

Population (2010)
  - Total: 14,730
- Time zone: UTC+1 (West Africa Time)

Chaabet El Ham (Arabic: شعبة اللحم) is a municipality in northwestern Algeria.
