= El Malah =

- Location of El Malah within Aïn Témouchent province
- Coordinates: 35°23′18″N 1°5′40″W
- Country: Algeria
- Province: Aïn Témouchent

Area
  - Total: 69.18 km^{2} (26.71 sq mi)

Population (2010)
  - Total: 18,944
  - Density: 273.8/km^{2} (709.2/sq mi)
- Time zone: UTC+1 (West Africa Time)

El Malah (formerly Rio Salado) is a municipality in northwestern Algeria.
