= Hammam Bou Hadjar =

- Location within Aïn Témouchent province
- Coordinates: 35°22′45″N 0°58′14″W
- Country: Algeria
- Province: Aïn Témouchent

Area
  - Total: 180.34 km^{2} (69.63 sq mi)

Population (2010)
  - Total: 35,158
  - Density: 194.95/km^{2} (504.93/sq mi)
- Time zone: UTC+1 (West Africa Time)

Hammam Bou Hadjar (Arabic: حمام بو حجار) is a town in northwestern Algeria.
