= Aïn Témouchent Province =

Province of Algeria

Aïn Témouchent Province ولاية عين تموشنت
- Province
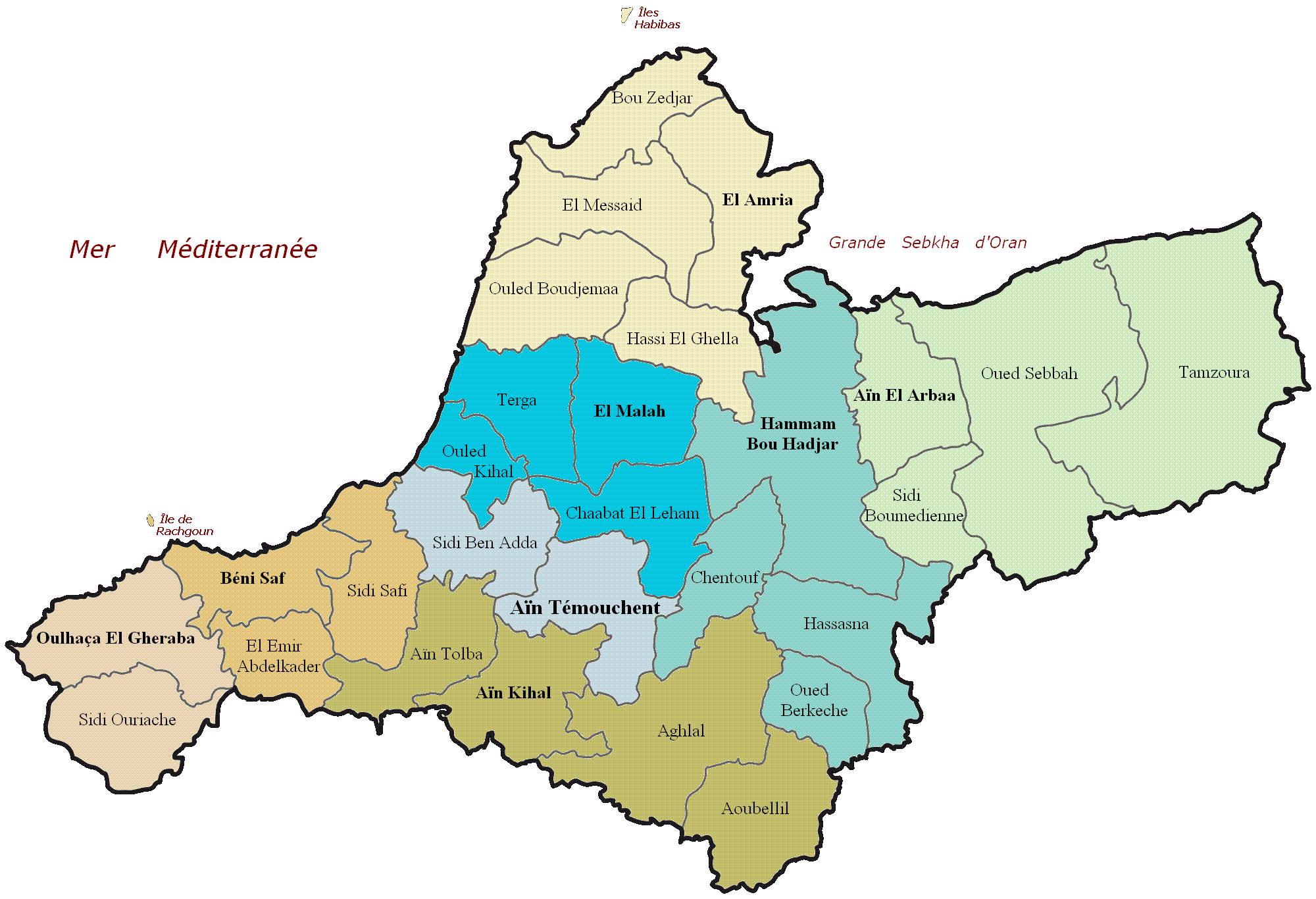
- Administrative map of Aïn Témouchent province

- Map of Algeria highlighting Aïn Témouchent
- Coordinates: 35°18′N 01°08′W
- Country: Algeria
- Capital: Aïn Témouchent

Government
  - PPA president: Mr. Tikhmarine Lakhdar (تيخمارين لخضر) (FLN)
  - Wāli: Mabrouk Ould Abdennebi

Area
  - Total: 2,376.89 km^{2} (917.72 sq mi)

Population (2010)
  - Total: 384,565
  - Density: 161.793/km^{2} (419.043/sq mi)
- Time zone: UTC+01 (CET)
- Area Code: +213 (0) 27
- ISO 3166 code: DZ-46
- Districts: 8
- Municipalities: 28

Aïn Témouchent (Arabic: ولاية عين تموشنت) is a province (wilaya) in northwestern Algeria, with a population of 432353 inhabitants in 2019, with a density of 182/square kilometers. Its named after its capital: Aïn Témouchent.

== History ==
The province was created from Sidi Bel Abbès Province in 1984.

== Administrative divisions ==
It is made up of 8 districts and 28 municipalities.

The districts are:

1. Aïn Kihel
2. Aïn Larbaâ
3. Aïn Témouchent
4. Béni Saf
5. El Amria
6. El Malah
7. Hammam Bou Hadjar
8. Oulhassa Gheraba

The municipalities are:

1. Aghlal
2. Aïn El Arbaa
3. Aïn Kihal
4. Aïn Témouchent
5. Aïn Tolba
6. Aoubellil
7. Beni Saf
8. Bou Zedjar
9. Chaabet El Ham
10. Chentouf
11. El Amria
12. El Emir Abdelkader
13. El Malah
14. El Messaid
15. Hammam Bouhadjar
16. Hassasna
17. Hassi El Ghella
18. Oued Berkeche
19. Oued Sabah
20. Ouled Boudjemaa
21. Ouled Kihal
22. Oulhaca El Gheraba
23. Sidi Ben Adda
24. Sidi Boumedienne
25. Sidi Ouriache
26. Sidi Safi
27. Tamzoura
28. Terga
