= 2026–27 US Biskra season =

US Biskra
2026–27 season
- President: Farès Benaissa
- Head coach: Nadhir Leknaoui (from 26 July 2026) (until 21 October 2026); Yamen Zelfani (from 26 October 2026) (until 18 November 2026)
- Stadium: Bouhafs Chabi Stadium
- Ligue 1: 16th
- Algerian Cup: Round of 64

The 2026–27 season, is US Biskra's 9th season in the top flight of Algerian football. In addition to the domestic league, US Biskra are participating in this season's editions of the Algerian Cup.

== Squad list ==
Players and squad numbers last updated on 31 August 2026.
Note: Flags indicate national team as has been defined under FIFA eligibility rules. Players may hold more than one non-FIFA nationality.

No.	Nat.	Name	Position	Date of Birth (Age)	Signed from
Goalkeepers
1	(Algeria)	Imad Benchlef	GK	12 October 1993 (aged 32)	(Algeria) NC Magra
16	(Algeria)	Redouane Maachou	GK	4 February 2001 (aged 25)	(Algeria) MB Rouissat
30	(Algeria)	Nasrallah Teniou	GK	8 August 2006 (aged 20)	(Algeria) CS Constantine
Defenders
3	(Ivory Coast)	Ezechiel Zaddy	LB	29 April 1997 (aged 29)	(Ivory Coast) Stade d'Abidjan
4	(Algeria)	Ahmed Oukkal	CB	25 February 1999 (aged 27)	(Algeria) AS Khroub
5	(Algeria)	Mohamed El Amine Barka	CB	20 March 1993 (aged 33)	(Algeria) ASO Chlef
15	(Algeria)	Oussama Gatal	RB	14 May 1997 (aged 29)	Unattached
17	(Algeria)	Khaled Bouhakak	CB	18 September 1993 (aged 32)	(Algeria) MB Rouissat
20	(Algeria)	Riadh Dahmani	RB	25 November 1996 (aged 29)	(Algeria) ES Mostaganem
21	(Algeria)	Mohamed Sakhri	CB	1 January 2006 (aged 20)	(Algeria) Youth team
22	(Algeria)	Ibrahim Bekakchi	CB	10 January 1992 (aged 34)	(Algeria) ES Sétif
Midfielders
6	(Algeria)	Imadeddine Diha	DM	12 November 2005 (aged 20)	(Algeria) Youth team
7	(Algeria)	Farès Bahlouli	AM	8 April 1995 (aged 31)	Unattached
8	(Algeria)	Khaled Neche	CM	27 July 1994 (aged 32)	(Saudi Arabia) Al-Kawkab FC
11	(Algeria)	Islam Belhadj	AM	26 July 1997 (aged 29)	(Algeria) USM El Harrach
14	(Comoros)	Yassine Saindou	DM	15 February 2001 (aged 25)	(Oman) Al-Shabab SC
18	(Algeria)	Mohamed Bahlouli	AM	17 February 2000 (aged 26)	(Oman) Saham Club
23	(Algeria)	Abdelhafid Benamara	DM	1 October 1995 (aged 30)	(Algeria) ES Mostaganem
26	(Algeria)	Abdeldjalil Ould Ammar	CM	12 October 2003 (aged 22)	(Algeria) NC Magra
Forwards
9	(Algeria)	Fodil Belkhadem	ST	25 January 2002 (aged 24)	(Algeria) MC El Bayadh
10	(Algeria)	Chouaib Debbih	LW	1 January 1993 (aged 33)	(Algeria) USM Khenchela
13	(Algeria)	Oussama Darfalou	ST	29 September 1993 (aged 32)	(Algeria) Olympique Akbou
19	(Algeria)	Chawki Gheddab	ST	1 January 2006 (aged 20)	(Algeria) Youth team
24	(Algeria)	Mohamed El Amine Hammia	LW	21 December 1991 (aged 34)	(Algeria) ES Ben Aknoun
27	(Algeria)	Kamel Belmiloud	RW	23 July 1995 (aged 31)	(Algeria) MC El Bayadh
28	(Democratic Republic of the Congo)	Aristote Zeke Omwele	RW	8 April 2001 (aged 25)	Oman Club
29	(Algeria)	Abdelkader Ghorab	LW	28 February 1998 (aged 28)	(Libya) Al-Madina SC

== Transfers ==
=== In ===
==== Summer ====
Date	Pos	Player	Moving from	Fee	Source
26 July 2026	CB	(Algeria) Mohamed Sakhri	Youth team	First Professional Contract	
26 July 2026	ST	(Algeria) Chawki Gheddab	Youth team	First Professional Contract	
28 July 2026	GK	(Algeria) Redouane Maachou	MB Rouissat	Free transfer	
28 July 2026	DM	(Algeria) Abdelhafid Benamara	ES Mostaganem	Free transfer	
29 July 2026	CM	(Algeria) Khaled Neche	(Saudi Arabia) Al-Kawkab FC	Free transfer	
29 July 2026	LW	(Algeria) Abdelkader Ghorab	(Libya) Al-Madina SC	Free transfer	
29 July 2026	RW	(Algeria) Kamel Belmiloud	MC El Bayadh	Free transfer	
29 July 2026	AM	(Algeria) Islam Belhadj	USM El Harrach	Free transfer	
1 August 2026	CM	(Algeria) Abdeldjalil Ould Ammar	NC Magra	Free transfer	
2 August 2026	CB	(Algeria) Khaled Bouhakak	MB Rouissat	Free transfer	
2 August 2026	AM	(Algeria) Farès Bahlouli	Unattached	Free transfer	
2 August 2026	LB	(Ivory Coast) Ezechiel Zaddy	(Ivory Coast) Stade d'Abidjan	Free transfer	
10 August 2026	CB	(Algeria) Ibrahim Bekakchi	ES Sétif	Free transfer	
10 August 2026	CB	(Algeria) Mohamed El Amine Barka	ASO Chlef	Free transfer	
11 August 2026	ST	(Algeria) Oussama Darfalou	Olympique Akbou	Free transfer	
11 August 2026	DM	(Comoros) Yassine Saindou	(Oman) Al-Shabab SC	Free transfer	
11 August 2026	ST	(Algeria) Fodil Belkhadem	MC El Bayadh	Free transfer	
11 August 2026	ST	(Democratic Republic of the Congo) Aristote Zeke Omwele	Oman Club	Free transfer	
31 August 2026	LW	(Algeria) Mohamed El Amine Hammia	ES Ben Aknoun	Free transfer	
31 August 2026	GK	(Algeria) Nasrallah Teniou	CS Constantine	Free transfer	
31 August 2026	RB	(Algeria) Oussama Gatal	Unattached	Free transfer	

=== Out ===
==== Summer ====
Date	Pos	Player	Moving to	Fee	Source
6 July 2026	DM	(Algeria) Zakarya Kemoukh	RC Kouba	Free transfer	
7 July 2026	GK	(Algeria) Oussama Mellala	CS Constantine	Free transfer	
30 July 2026	RW	(Algeria) Chérif Siam	NA Hussein Dey	Free transfer	
1 August 2026	CB	(Algeria) Tarek Adouane	Unattached	Free transfer (Released)	
1 August 2026	DM	(Algeria) Mohamed Heriat	Unattached	Free transfer (Released)	
23 August 2026	RB	(Algeria) Zakaria Zaitri	USM Khenchela	Free transfer	

=== New contracts ===
No.	Pos	Player	Contract length	Contract end	Date	Source
1	GK	Imad Benchlef	2 years	2028	19 July 2026	
4	CB	Ahmed Oukkal	2 years	2028	27 July 2026	
20	RB	Riadh Dahmani	2 years	2028	27 July 2026	
6	DM	Imadeddine Diha	2 years	2028	27 July 2026	
10	LW	Chouaib Debbih	2 years	2028	19 July 2026	

== Competitions ==
=== Overview ===
Competition	Record								Started round	Final position / round	First match	Last match
Competition	G	W	D	L	GF	GA	GD	Win %	Started round	Final position / round	First match	Last match
Ligue 1	10	0	5	5	5	15	−10	0.00	—N/a	To be confirmed	10 September 2026	In Progress
Algerian Cup	0	0	0	0	0	0	+0	—	Round of 64	To be confirmed	December 2026	In Progress
Total	10	0	5	5	5	15	−10	0.00				

Updated to match played 20 November 2026
Source: Competitions

=== Ligue 1 ===
==== League table ====
Pos	Team	Pld	W	D	L	GF	GA	GD	Pts	Qualification or relegation
12	ES Ben Aknoun	9	1	5	3	8	10	−2	8	
13	ASO Chlef	10	1	5	4	9	13	−4	8	
14	JS Saoura	9	1	4	4	2	8	−6	7	Relegation to Algerian League 2
15	USM Khenchela	10	1	4	5	5	12	−7	7	Relegation to Algerian League 2
16	US Biskra	10	0	5	5	5	15	−10	5	Relegation to Algerian League 2

Updated to match(es) played on 20 November 2026. Source: lfp.dz
Rules for classification: 1) Points; 2) Head-to-head points; 3) Head-to-head goal difference; 4) First half goal difference; 5) First half total goals; 6) Fairplay ranking; 7) Playoff.

==== Results summary ====
Overall								Home						Away					
Pld	W	D	L	GF	GA	GD	Pts	W	D	L	GF	GA	GD	W	D	L	GF	GA	GD
10	0	5	5	5	15	−10	5	0	2	3	0	3	−3	0	3	2	5	12	−7

Last updated: 20 November 2026.
Source: Competitive matches

==== Results by round ====
Round	1	2	3	4	5	6	7	8	9	10	11	12	13	14	15	16	17	18	19	20	21	22	23	24	25	26	27	28	29	30
Ground	H	A	H	A	H	A	H	A	H	A	H	H	A	H	A	A	H	A	H	A	H	A	H	A	H	A	A	H	A	H
Result	D	D	L	L	L	L	L	D	D	D																				
Position	10																													

Updated to match(es) played on 20 November 2026. Source: Competitive matches
A = Away; H = Home; W = Win; D = Draw; L = Loss

==== Matches ====
The league fixtures were announced on 3 August 2026.

All times are local, WAT (UTC+1).

Win Draw Loss Postponed

10 September 2026 Round 2	ES Ben Aknoun	2–2	US Biskra	Belouizdad
19:00	Djabout 5'; Bechou 88'	Flashscore; LFP	Belkhadem 19'; Saindou 45+5'	Stadium: 20 August 1955 Stadium; Referee: Fateh Harkat

17 September 2026 Round 3	US Biskra	0–1	CR Belouizdad	Zeribet El Oued
18:00		Flashscore; LFP	Boukhanchouche 78'	Stadium: Bouhafs Chabi Stadium; Referee: Akram Mechairia

22 September 2026 Round 1	US Biskra	0–0	JS Saoura	Zeribet El Oued
17:00		Flashscore; LFP		Stadium: Bouhafs Chabi Stadium; Referee: Haitham Ghouti

7 October 2026 Round 4	CS Constantine	4–0	US Biskra	Constantine
18:00	Agbagno 37'; Barka 50' (o.g.); Rebiaï 65'; Djaouchi 73'	Flashscore; LFP		Stadium: Chahid Hamlaoui Stadium; Referee: Abdelali Ibrir

13 October 2026 Round 5	US Biskra	0–1	MC Oran	Zeribet El Oued
15:00		Flashscore; LFP	Mouley 76'	Stadium: Bouhafs Chabi Stadium; Referee: Lahlou Benbraham

18 October 2026 Round 6	JS Kabylie	4–1	US Biskra	Tizi Ouzou
17:45	Benchamma 40'; Mahious 42'; Bouamama 49'; Hamidi 67'	Flashscore; LFP	Belkhadem 12'	Stadium: Hocine Aït Ahmed Stadium; Referee: Tayeb Benyabka

27 October 2026 Round 7	US Biskra	0–1	MC Alger	Zeribet El Oued
15:00		Flashscore; LFP	Konaté 57'	Stadium: Bouhafs Chabi Stadium; Referee: Alaa Bouab

2 November 2026 Round 8	CR Témouchent	1–1	US Biskra	Aïn Témouchent
17:45	Saihi 72'	Flashscore; LFP	Belkhadem 34'	Stadium: Omar Oucief Stadium; Referee: Rafiq Aouina

8 November 2026 Round 9	US Biskra	0–0	ASO Chlef	Zeribet El Oued
14:00		Flashscore; LFP		Stadium: Bouhafs Chabi Stadium; Referee: Haitham Ghouti

20 November 2026 Round 10	ES Sétif	1–1	US Biskra	Sétif
17:00	Zerrouki 55' (pen.)	Flashscore; LFP	Belkhadem 32'	Stadium: 8 May 1945 Stadium; Referee: Tayeb Benyebka

30 November 2026 Round 11	US Biskra	–	MB Rouissat	Zeribet El Oued
14:00		Flashscore; LFP		Stadium: Bouhafs Chabi Stadium

Round 12	US Biskra	–	USM Khenchela	Zeribet El Oued
:		Flashscore; LFP		Stadium: Bouhafs Chabi Stadium

Round 13	JS El Biar	–	US Biskra	Blida
:		Flashscore; LFP		Stadium: Mustapha Tchaker Stadium

Round 14	US Biskra	–	Olympique Akbou	Zeribet El Oued
:		Flashscore; LFP		Stadium: Bouhafs Chabi Stadium

Round 15	USM Alger	–	US Biskra	Algiers
:		Flashscore; LFP		Stadium: Stade du 5 Juillet

Round 16	JS Saoura	–	US Biskra	Béchar
:		Flashscore; LFP		Stadium: 20 August 1955 Stadium

Round 17	US Biskra	–	ES Ben Aknoun	Zeribet El Oued
:		Flashscore; LFP		Stadium: Bouhafs Chabi Stadium

Round 18	CR Belouizdad	–	US Biskra	Baraki
:		Flashscore; LFP		Stadium: Nelson Mandela Stadium

Round 19	US Biskra	–	CS Constantine	Zeribet El Oued
:		Flashscore; LFP		Stadium: Bouhafs Chabi Stadium

Round 20	MC Oran	–	US Biskra	Bir El Djir
:		Flashscore; LFP		Stadium: Miloud Hadefi Stadium

Round 21	US Biskra	–	JS Kabylie	Zeribet El Oued
:		Flashscore; LFP		Stadium: Bouhafs Chabi Stadium

Round 22	MC Alger	–	US Biskra	Douéra
:		Flashscore; LFP		Stadium: Ali La Pointe Stadium

Round 23	US Biskra	–	CR Témouchent	Zeribet El Oued
:		Flashscore; LFP		Stadium: Bouhafs Chabi Stadium

Round 24	ASO Chlef	–	US Biskra	Chlef
:		Flashscore; LFP		Stadium: Mohamed Boumezrag Stadium

Round 25	US Biskra	–	ES Sétif	Zeribet El Oued
:		Flashscore; LFP		Stadium: Bouhafs Chabi Stadium

Round 26	MB Rouissat	–	US Biskra	Ouargla
:		Flashscore; LFP		Stadium: 18 February Stadium

Round 27	USM Khenchela	–	US Biskra	Khenchela
:		Flashscore; LFP		Stadium: Amar Hamam Stadium

Round 28	US Biskra	–	JS El Biar	Zeribet El Oued
:		Flashscore; LFP		Stadium: Bouhafs Chabi Stadium

Round 29	Olympique Akbou	–	US Biskra	Akbou
:		Flashscore; LFP		Stadium: Martyrs Stadium

Round 30	US Biskra	–	USM Alger	Zeribet El Oued
:		Flashscore; LFP		Stadium: Bouhafs Chabi Stadium

=== Algerian Cup ===
December 2026 Round of 64	–
:

== Squad information ==
=== Appearances and goals ===
As of 20 November 2026

No.	Pos	Player	Nat	Ligue 1			Algerian Cup			Total		
No.	Pos	Player	Nat	App	St	G	App	St	G	App	St	G
Goalkeepers
1	GK	Imad Benchlef	(Algeria)	5	5	0	0	0	0	0	0	0
16	GK	Redouane Maachou	(Algeria)	5	5	0	0	0	0	0	0	0
30	GK	Abderrahmane Amri	(Algeria)	0	0	0	0	0	0	0	0	0
Defenders
3	LB	Ezechiel Zaddy	(Ivory Coast)	7	5	0	0	0	0	0	0	0
4	CB	Ahmed Oukkal	(Algeria)	5	4	0	0	0	0	0	0	0
5	CB	Mohamed El Amine Barka	(Algeria)	5	5	0	0	0	0	0	0	0
15	RB	Oussama Gatal	(Algeria)	1	0	0	0	0	0	0	0	0
17	CB	Khaled Bouhakak	(Algeria)	9	8	0	0	0	0	0	0	0
20	RB	Riadh Dahmani	(Algeria)	10	9	0	0	0	0	0	0	0
21	CB	Mohamed Sakhri	(Algeria)	0	0	0	0	0	0	0	0	0
22	CB	Ibrahim Bekakchi	(Algeria)	10	10	0	0	0	0	0	0	0
Midfielders
6	DM	Imadeddine Diha	(Algeria)	3	0	0	0	0	0	0	0	0
7	AM	Farès Bahlouli	(Algeria)	6	5	0	0	0	0	0	0	0
8	CM	Khaled Neche	(Algeria)	8	5	0	0	0	0	0	0	0
11	AM	Islam Belhadj	(Algeria)	8	5	0	0	0	0	0	0	0
14	DM	Yassine Saindou	(Comoros)	7	7	1	0	0	0	0	0	0
18	AM	Mohamed Bahlouli	(Algeria)	0	0	0	0	0	0	0	0	0
23	DM	Abdelhafid Benamara	(Algeria)	9	9	0	0	0	0	0	0	0
26	CM	Abdeldjalil Ould Ammar	(Algeria)	2	0	0	0	0	0	0	0	0
Forwards
9	ST	Fodil Belkhadem	(Algeria)	10	7	4	0	0	0	0	0	0
10	LW	Chouaib Debbih	(Algeria)	9	5	0	0	0	0	0	0	0
13	ST	Oussama Darfalou	(Algeria)	6	6	0	0	0	0	0	0	0
19	ST	Chawki Gheddab	(Algeria)	2	0	0	0	0	0	0	0	0
24	LW	Mohamed El Amine Hammia	(Algeria)	6	2	0	0	0	0	0	0	0
27	RW	Kamel Belmiloud	(Algeria)	7	0	0	0	0	0	0	0	0
28	RW	Aristote Zeke Omwele	(Democratic Republic of the Congo)	9	5	0	0	0	0	0	0	0
29	LW	Abdelkader Ghorab	(Algeria)	7	3	0	0	0	0	0	0	0
Total				10		5	0		0	0		0

Last updated: 20 November 2026
Source: soccerway.com

=== Goalscorers ===
As of 20 November 2026

Includes all competitive matches.

No.	Nat.	Player	Pos.	L1	AC	TOTAL
9	(Algeria)	Fodil Belkhadem	ST	4	0	4
14	(Comoros)	Yassine Saindou	DM	1	0	1
Own Goals				0	0	0
Totals				5	0	5

=== Clean sheets ===
As of 20 November 2026

Includes all competitive matches.

					Clean sheets		
No.	Nat	Name	GP	GA	L1	AC	Total
1	(Algeria)	Imad Benchlef	5	7	1	0	1
16	(Algeria)	Redouane Maachou	5	8	1	0	1
30	(Algeria)	Nasrallah Teniou	0	0	0	0	0
		TOTALS		15	2	0	2
