= 2026–27 JS Kabylie season =

JS Kabylie
2026–27 season
- Owner: ATM Mobilis
- President: Adel Boudedja
- Head coach: Karim Belhocine (from 4 July 2026)
- Stadium: Hocine Aït Ahmed Stadium
- Ligue 1: 1st
- Algerian Cup: Round of 64
| Home colours | Away colours |

The 2026–27 season, is JS Kabylie's 58th consecutive season in the top flight of Algerian football. In addition to the domestic league, JS Kabylie are participating in this season's editions of the Algerian Cup.

== Squad list ==
Players and squad numbers last updated on 31 August 2026.
Note: Flags indicate national team as has been defined under FIFA eligibility rules. Players may hold more than one non-FIFA nationality.

| No. | Nat. | Name | Position | Date of Birth (Age) | Signed from |
Goalkeepers
| 16 | (Algeria) | Alexis Guendouz | GK | 26 January 1996 (aged 30) | (Algeria) MC Alger |
| 30 | (Algeria) | Seif Benrabah | GK | 23 March 2003 (aged 23) | (Algeria) Reserve team |
Defenders
| 3 | (Algeria) | Rami Bouaouiche | CB | 26 May 2006 (aged 20) | (Algeria) MC Alger |
| 6 | (Algeria) | Toufik Cherifi | CB | 19 October 2001 (aged 24) | (Tunisia) Club Africain |
| 13 | (Mauritania) | Aly Abeid | LB | 11 December 1997 (aged 28) | (Romania) CFR Cluj |
| 17 | (Algeria) | Mohamed Réda Hamidi | RB | 8 June 2001 (aged 25) | (Algeria) Paradou AC |
| 19 | (Algeria) | Abdellah Bendouma | LB | 7 October 2001 (aged 24) | (Algeria) Paradou AC |
| 20 | (Algeria) | Mohamed Amine Madani | CB | 20 March 1992 (aged 34) | (Algeria) CS Constantine |
| 23 | (Mauritania) | Nouh Mohamed El Abd | CB | 24 December 2000 (aged 25) | (Morocco) AS FAR |
| 24 | (Algeria) | Chouaib Boulkaboul | LB | 3 April 2001 (aged 25) | (Algeria) ES Mostaganem |
| 26 | (Algeria) | Ayoub Sadahine | RB | 16 June 2001 (aged 25) | (Algeria) ASO Chlef |
| 28 | (Algeria) | Reda Benchaa | CB | 12 March 2002 (aged 24) | (Kuwait) Kazma SC |
Midfielders
| 4 | (Algeria) | Mostapha Bott | DM | 21 July 2004 (aged 22) | (Algeria) Reserve team |
| 5 | (Algeria) | Messala Merbah | DM | 22 July 1994 (aged 32) | (Algeria) CS Constantine |
| 8 | (Ivory Coast) | Josaphat Arthur Bada | CM | 7 August 2002 (aged 24) | (Tanzania) Singida |
| 10 | (Algeria) | Badis Bouamama | AM | 16 June 2004 (aged 22) | (Algeria) ES Ben Aknoun |
| 14 | (Tanzania) | Alphonce Msanga | DM | 14 June 2003 (aged 23) | (Azerbaijan) Şamaxı FK |
| 15 | (Algeria) | Youcef Izem | CM | 9 February 2007 (aged 19) | (Algeria) Reserve team |
| 25 | (Algeria) | Samy Benchamma | DM | 25 June 2000 (aged 26) | (France) Rodez AF |
Forwards
| 7 | (Algeria) | Mustapha Soukkou | RW | 19 March 2003 (aged 23) | (Algeria) Paradou AC |
| 9 | (Algeria) | Billel Messaoudi | ST | 21 December 1997 (aged 28) | (Turkey) Bandırmaspor |
| 11 | (Algeria) | Lahlou Akhrib | RW | 24 April 2005 (aged 21) | (Algeria) Reserve team |
| 12 | (Algeria) | Yannis Lagha | ST | 21 June 2004 (aged 22) | (France) Olympique Lyonnais |
| 18 | (Algeria) | Aymen Mahious | ST | 15 September 1997 (aged 28) | (Algeria) CR Belouizdad |
| 21 | (Algeria) | Abdennour Belhocini | RW | 18 August 1996 (aged 30) | (Algeria) CR Belouizdad |
| 22 | (Algeria) | Islam Tichtich | RW | 23 July 2006 (aged 20) | (Algeria) Reserve team |
| 27 | (Algeria) | Oualid Malki | ST | 12 February 2004 (aged 22) | (Algeria) Reserve team |

== Transfers ==
=== In ===
==== Summer ====
| Date | Pos | Player | Moving from | Fee | Source |
|---|---|---|---|---|---|
| 7 June 2026 | LB | (Algeria) Hamza Mouali | JS Saoura | Loan return | |
| 7 June 2026 | ST | (Algeria) Massinissa Nezla | MB Rouissat | Loan return | |
| 7 June 2026 | CB | (Algeria) Idir Mokeddem | (Iraq) Al-Quwa Al-Jawiya | Loan return | |
| 26 June 2026 | AM | (Algeria) Badis Bouamama | ES Ben Aknoun | Free transfer | |
| 28 June 2026 | DM | (Algeria) Messala Merbah | CS Constantine | Free transfer | |
| 1 July 2026 | CB | (Algeria) Toufik Cherifi | (Tunisia) Club Africain | Free transfer | |
| 3 July 2026 | LB | (Algeria) Abdellah Bendouma | Paradou AC | Undisclosed | |
| 3 July 2026 | RW | (Algeria) Mustapha Soukkou | Paradou AC | Undisclosed | |
| 24 July 2026 | CB | (Mauritania) Nouh Mohamed El Abd | (Morocco) AS FAR | Free transfer | |
| 30 July 2026 | RW | (Algeria) Abdennour Belhocini | CR Belouizdad | Undisclosed | |
| 10 August 2026 | GK | (Algeria) Alexis Guendouz | MC Alger | Undisclosed | |
| 19 August 2026 | RB | (Algeria) Ayoub Sadahine | ASO Chlef | Undisclosed | |
| 30 August 2026 | CB | (Algeria) Rami Bouaouiche | MC Alger | Free transfer | |
| 31 August 2026 | DM | (Algeria) Samy Benchamma | (France) Rodez AF | Free transfer | |
| 31 August 2026 | DM | (Tanzania) Alphonce Msanga | (Azerbaijan) Şamaxı FK | Free transfer | |
| 31 August 2026 | ST | (Algeria) Yannis Lagha | (France) Olympique Lyonnais | Free transfer | |
| 31 August 2026 | LB | (Mauritania) Aly Abeid | (Romania) CFR Cluj | Undisclosed | |

=== Out ===
==== Summer ====
| Date | Pos | Player | Moving to | Fee | Source |
|---|---|---|---|---|---|
| 6 June 2026 | AM | (Algeria) Ryad Boudebouz | Unattached | Free transfer (Released) | |
| 23 June 2026 | LW | (Chad) Célestin Ecua | Unattached | Free transfer (Released) | |
| 24 June 2026 | CB | (Algeria) Chahine Bellaouel | Unattached | Free transfer (Released) | |
| 8 July 2026 | DM | (Senegal) Babacar Sarr | (Morocco) IR Tangier | Free transfer | |
| 14 July 2026 | LB | (Algeria) Hamza Mouali | Olympique Akbou | Undisclosed | |
| 14 July 2026 | RB | (Algeria) Fares Nechat Djabri | Unattached | Free transfer (Released) | |
| 16 July 2026 | LB | (Algeria) Ahmed Maâmeri | JS El Biar | Free transfer | |
| 16 July 2026 | ST | (Algeria) Massinissa Nezla | Unattached | Free transfer (Released) | |
| 19 July 2026 | RW | (Angola) Jaredi Teixeira | Unattached | Free transfer (Released) | |
| 22 July 2026 | CB | (Algeria) Idir Mokeddem | Unattached | Free transfer (Released) | |
| 3 August 2026 | CB | (Algeria) Zineddine Belaïd | (Saudi Arabia) Al Taawoun FC | Undisclosed | |
| 15 August 2026 | LB | (Algeria) Abdelhak Cherir | Unattached | Free transfer (Released) | |
| 23 August 2026 | RB | (Algeria) Oussama Benatia | Unattached | Free transfer (Released) | |
| 16 September 2026 | GK | (Algeria) Gaya Merbah | Unattached | Free transfer (Released) | |

=== New contracts ===
| No. | Pos | Player | Contract length | Contract end | Date | Source |
|---|---|---|---|---|---|---|
| 30 | GK | Seif Benrabah | 2 years | 2028 | 25 June 2026 | |
| 11 | RW | Lahlou Akhrib | 1 year | 2028 | 25 August 2026 | |

== Competitions ==
=== Overview ===
| Competition | Record | | | | | | | | Started round | Final position / round | First match | Last match |
| Competition | G | W | D | L | GF | GA | GD | Win % | Started round | Final position / round | First match | Last match |
|---|---|---|---|---|---|---|---|---|---|---|---|---|
| Ligue 1 | 9 | 6 | 2 | 1 | 13 | 3 | +10 | 66.67 | —N/a | To be confirmed | 4 September 2026 | In Progress |
| Algerian Cup | 0 | 0 | 0 | 0 | 0 | 0 | +0 | — | Round of 64 | To be confirmed | December 2026 | In Progress |
| Total | 9 | 6 | 2 | 1 | 13 | 3 | +10 | 66.67 | | | | |

Updated to match played 19 November 2026
Source: Competitions

=== Ligue 1 ===
==== League table ====
| Pos | Team | Pld | W | D | L | GF | GA | GD | Pts | Qualification or relegation |
|---|---|---|---|---|---|---|---|---|---|---|
| 1 | JS Kabylie | 9 | 6 | 2 | 1 | 13 | 3 | +10 | 20 | Qualification for CAF Champions League |
| 2 | CR Belouizdad | 9 | 6 | 2 | 1 | 13 | 8 | +5 | 20 | Qualification for CAF Champions League |
| 3 | MC Oran | 9 | 5 | 3 | 1 | 8 | 3 | +5 | 18 | Qualification for CAF Confederation Cup |
| 4 | MB Rouissat | 10 | 5 | 3 | 2 | 10 | 6 | +4 | 18 | |
| 5 | MC Alger | 8 | 5 | 1 | 2 | 9 | 3 | +6 | 16 | |

Updated to match(es) played on 20 November 2026. Source: lfp.dz
Rules for classification: 1) Points; 2) Head-to-head points; 3) Head-to-head goal difference; 4) First half goal difference; 5) First half total goals; 6) Fairplay ranking; 7) Playoff.

==== Results summary ====
| Overall | | | | | | | | Home | | | | | | Away | | | | | |
| Pld | W | D | L | GF | GA | GD | Pts | W | D | L | GF | GA | GD | W | D | L | GF | GA | GD |
|---|---|---|---|---|---|---|---|---|---|---|---|---|---|---|---|---|---|---|---|
| 9 | 6 | 2 | 1 | 13 | 3 | +10 | 20 | 5 | 0 | 0 | 9 | 1 | +8 | 1 | 2 | 1 | 4 | 2 | +2 |

Last updated: 19 November 2026.
Source: Competitive matches

==== Results by round ====
| Round | 1 | 2 | 3 | 4 | 5 | 6 | 7 | 8 | 9 | 10 | 11 | 12 | 13 | 14 | 15 | 16 | 17 | 18 | 19 | 20 | 21 | 22 | 23 | 24 | 25 | 26 | 27 | 28 | 29 | 30 |
|---|---|---|---|---|---|---|---|---|---|---|---|---|---|---|---|---|---|---|---|---|---|---|---|---|---|---|---|---|---|---|
| Ground | H | H | A | H | A | H | A | H | A | H | A | H | A | H | A | A | A | H | A | H | A | H | A | H | A | H | A | H | A | H |
| Result | W | | L | W | D | W | W | W | D | W | | | | | | | | | | | | | | | | | | | | |
| Position | | | | | | | | | | | | | | | | | | | | | | | | | | | | | | |

Updated to match(es) played on 19 November 2026. Source: Competitive matches
A = Away; H = Home; W = Win; D = Draw; L = Loss

==== Matches ====
The league fixtures were announced on 3 August 2026.

All times are local, WAT (UTC+1).

Win Draw Loss Postponed

| 4 September 2026 Round 1 | JS Kabylie | 1–0 | MB Rouissat | Tizi Ouzou |
| 21:00 | Belhocini 41' | Flashscore; LFP | | Stadium: Hocine Aït Ahmed Stadium; Referee: Akram Mechairia |

| 17 September 2026 Round 3 | CR Témouchent | 1–0 | JS Kabylie | Aïn Témouchent |
| 20:00 | Chahrour 73' | Flashscore; LFP | | Stadium: Omar Oucief Stadium; Referee: Mustapha Ghorbal |

| 9 October 2026 Round 4 | JS Kabylie | 1–0 | ASO Chlef | Tizi Ouzou |
| 18:00 | Mahious 12' (pen.) | Flashscore; LFP | | Stadium: Hocine Aït Ahmed Stadium; Referee: Mehdi Oukil |

| 14 October 2026 Round 5 | ES Sétif | 1–1 | JS Kabylie | Sétif |
| 18:00 | Benayad 10' | Flashscore; LFP | Messaoudi 33' | Stadium: 8 May 1945 Stadium; Referee: Anes Azrine |

| 18 October 2026 Round 6 | JS Kabylie | 4–1 | US Biskra | Tizi Ouzou |
| 17:45 | Benchamma 40'; Mahious 42'; Bouamama 49'; Hamidi 67' | Flashscore; LFP | Belkhadem 12' | Stadium: Hocine Aït Ahmed Stadium; Referee: Tayeb Benyabka |

| 24 October 2026 Round 7 | USM Khenchela | 0–3 | JS Kabylie | Khenchela |
| 15:00 | | Flashscore; LFP | Bouamama 48'; Hamidi 54'; Messaoudi 64' | Stadium: Amar Hamam Stadium; Referee: Ayoub Belhachemi |

| 30 October 2026 Round 8 | JS Kabylie | 1–0 | JS El Biar | Tizi Ouzou |
| 17:45 | Messaoudi 58' (pen.) | Flashscore; LFP | | Stadium: Hocine Aït Ahmed Stadium; Referee: Fateh Harkat |

| 7 November 2026 Round 9 | Olympique Akbou | 0–0 | JS Kabylie | Akbou |
| 14:00 | | Flashscore; LFP | | Stadium: Martyrs Stadium; Referee: Akram Mechairia |

| 19 November 2026 Round 10 | JS Kabylie | 2–0 | USM Alger | Tizi Ouzou |
| 20:00 | Belhocini 32', 51' | Flashscore; LFP | | Stadium: Hocine Aït Ahmed Stadium; Referee: Rafiq Aouina |

| 23 November 2026 Round 2 | JS Kabylie | – | MC Alger | Tizi Ouzou |
| 19:00 | | Flashscore; LFP | | Stadium: Hocine Aït Ahmed Stadium; Referee: Alaa Bouab |

| 1 December 2026 Round 11 | JS Saoura | – | JS Kabylie | Béchar |
| 17:00 | | Flashscore; LFP | | Stadium: 20 August 1955 Stadium |

| Round 12 | JS Kabylie | – | ES Ben Aknoun | Tizi Ouzou |
| : | | Flashscore; LFP | | Stadium: Hocine Aït Ahmed Stadium |

| Round 13 | CR Belouizdad | – | JS Kabylie | Baraki |
| : | | Flashscore; LFP | | Stadium: Nelson Mandela Stadium |

| Round 14 | JS Kabylie | – | CS Constantine | Tizi Ouzou |
| : | | Flashscore; LFP | | Stadium: Hocine Aït Ahmed Stadium |

| Round 15 | MC Oran | – | JS Kabylie | Bir El Djir |
| : | | Flashscore; LFP | | Stadium: Miloud Hadefi Stadium |

| Round 16 | MB Rouissat | – | JS Kabylie | Ouargla |
| : | | Flashscore; LFP | | Stadium: 18 February Stadium |

| Round 17 | MC Alger | – | JS Kabylie | Douéra |
| : | | Flashscore; LFP | | Stadium: Ali La Pointe Stadium |

| Round 18 | JS Kabylie | – | CR Témouchent | Tizi Ouzou |
| : | | Flashscore; LFP | | Stadium: Hocine Aït Ahmed Stadium |

| Round 19 | ASO Chlef | – | JS Kabylie | Chlef |
| : | | Flashscore; LFP | | Stadium: Mohamed Boumezrag Stadium |

| Round 20 | JS Kabylie | – | ES Sétif | Tizi Ouzou |
| : | | Flashscore; LFP | | Stadium: Hocine Aït Ahmed Stadium |

| Round 21 | US Biskra | – | JS Kabylie | Zeribet El Oued |
| : | | Flashscore; LFP | | Stadium: Bouhafs Chabi Stadium |

| Round 22 | JS Kabylie | – | USM Khenchela | Tizi Ouzou |
| : | | Flashscore; LFP | | Stadium: Hocine Aït Ahmed Stadium |

| Round 23 | JS El Biar | – | JS Kabylie | Blida |
| : | | Flashscore; LFP | | Stadium: Mustapha Tchaker Stadium |

| Round 24 | JS Kabylie | – | Olympique Akbou | Tizi Ouzou |
| : | | Flashscore; LFP | | Stadium: Hocine Aït Ahmed Stadium |

| Round 25 | USM Alger | – | JS Kabylie | Algiers |
| : | | Flashscore; LFP | | Stadium: Stade du 5 Juillet |

| Round 26 | JS Kabylie | – | JS Saoura | Tizi Ouzou |
| : | | Flashscore; LFP | | Stadium: Hocine Aït Ahmed Stadium |

| Round 27 | ES Ben Aknoun | – | JS Kabylie | Belouizdad |
| : | | Flashscore; LFP | | Stadium: 20 August 1955 Stadium |

| Round 28 | JS Kabylie | – | CR Belouizdad | Tizi Ouzou |
| : | | Flashscore; LFP | | Stadium: Hocine Aït Ahmed Stadium |

| Round 29 | CS Constantine | – | JS Kabylie | Constantine |
| : | | Flashscore; LFP | | Stadium: Chahid Hamlaoui Stadium |

| Round 30 | JS Kabylie | – | MC Oran | Tizi Ouzou |
| : | | Flashscore; LFP | | Stadium: Hocine Aït Ahmed Stadium |

=== Algerian Cup ===
| December 2026 Round of 64 | – |
| : |

== Squad information ==
=== Appearances and goals ===
As of 19 November 2026

| No. | Pos | Player | Nat | Ligue 1 | | | Algerian Cup | | | Total | | |
| No. | Pos | Player | Nat | App | St | G | App | St | G | App | St | G |
|---|---|---|---|---|---|---|---|---|---|---|---|---|
Goalkeepers
| 16 | GK | Alexis Guendouz | (Algeria) | 9 | 9 | 0 | 0 | 0 | 0 | 0 | 0 | 0 |
| 30 | GK | Seif Benrabah | (Algeria) | 0 | 0 | 0 | 0 | 0 | 0 | 0 | 0 | 0 |
Defenders
| 3 | CB | Rami Bouaouiche | (Algeria) | 0 | 0 | 0 | 0 | 0 | 0 | 0 | 0 | 0 |
| 6 | CB | Toufik Cherifi | (Algeria) | 6 | 6 | 0 | 0 | 0 | 0 | 0 | 0 | 0 |
| 13 | LB | Aly Abeid | (Mauritania) | 2 | 0 | 0 | 0 | 0 | 0 | 0 | 0 | 0 |
| 17 | RB | Mohamed Réda Hamidi | (Algeria) | 7 | 3 | 2 | 0 | 0 | 0 | 0 | 0 | 0 |
| 19 | LB | Abdellah Bendouma | (Algeria) | 3 | 0 | 0 | 0 | 0 | 0 | 0 | 0 | 0 |
| 20 | CB | Mohamed Amine Madani | (Algeria) | 0 | 0 | 0 | 0 | 0 | 0 | 0 | 0 | 0 |
| 23 | CB | Nouh Mohamed El Abd | (Mauritania) | 6 | 6 | 0 | 0 | 0 | 0 | 0 | 0 | 0 |
| 24 | LB | Chouaib Boulkaboul | (Algeria) | 9 | 9 | 0 | 0 | 0 | 0 | 0 | 0 | 0 |
| 26 | RB | Ayoub Sadahine | (Algeria) | 9 | 9 | 0 | 0 | 0 | 0 | 0 | 0 | 0 |
| 28 | CB | Reda Benchaa | (Algeria) | 6 | 6 | 0 | 0 | 0 | 0 | 0 | 0 | 0 |
Midfielders
| 4 | DM | Mostapha Bott | (Algeria) | 6 | 1 | 0 | 0 | 0 | 0 | 0 | 0 | 0 |
| 5 | DM | Messala Merbah | (Algeria) | 0 | 0 | 0 | 0 | 0 | 0 | 0 | 0 | 0 |
| 8 | CM | Josaphat Arthur Bada | (Ivory Coast) | 7 | 7 | 0 | 0 | 0 | 0 | 0 | 0 | 0 |
| 10 | AM | Badis Bouamama | (Algeria) | 8 | 8 | 2 | 0 | 0 | 0 | 0 | 0 | 0 |
| 14 | DM | Alphonce Msanga | (Tanzania) | 8 | 1 | 0 | 0 | 0 | 0 | 0 | 0 | 0 |
| 15 | CM | Youcef Izem | (Algeria) | 4 | 0 | 0 | 0 | 0 | 0 | 0 | 0 | 0 |
| 25 | DM | Samy Benchamma | (Algeria) | 9 | 9 | 1 | 0 | 0 | 0 | 0 | 0 | 0 |
Forwards
| 7 | RW | Mustapha Soukkou | (Algeria) | 0 | 0 | 0 | 0 | 0 | 0 | 0 | 0 | 0 |
| 9 | ST | Billel Messaoudi | (Algeria) | 9 | 9 | 3 | 0 | 0 | 0 | 0 | 0 | 0 |
| 11 | RW | Lahlou Akhrib | (Algeria) | 9 | 5 | 0 | 0 | 0 | 0 | 0 | 0 | 0 |
| 12 | ST | Yannis Lagha | (Algeria) | 3 | 1 | 0 | 0 | 0 | 0 | 0 | 0 | 0 |
| 18 | ST | Aymen Mahious | (Algeria) | 8 | 6 | 2 | 0 | 0 | 0 | 0 | 0 | 0 |
| 21 | RW | Abdennour Belhocini | (Algeria) | 6 | 3 | 3 | 0 | 0 | 0 | 0 | 0 | 0 |
| 22 | RW | Islam Tichtich | (Algeria) | 2 | 0 | 0 | 0 | 0 | 0 | 0 | 0 | 0 |
| 27 | ST | Oualid Malki | (Algeria) | 2 | 0 | 0 | 0 | 0 | 0 | 0 | 0 | 0 |
| Total | | | | 9 | | 13 | 0 | | 0 | 0 | | 0 |

Last updated: 19 November 2026
Source: soccerway.com

=== Goalscorers ===
As of 19 November 2026

Includes all competitive matches.

| No. | Nat. | Player | Pos. | L1 | AC | TOTAL |
|---|---|---|---|---|---|---|
| 9 | (Algeria) | Billel Messaoudi | ST | 3 | 0 | 3 |
| 21 | (Algeria) | Abdennour Belhocini | RW | 3 | 0 | 3 |
| 18 | (Algeria) | Aymen Mahious | ST | 2 | 0 | 2 |
| 10 | (Algeria) | Badis Bouamama | AM | 2 | 0 | 2 |
| 17 | (Algeria) | Mohamed Réda Hamidi | RB | 2 | 0 | 2 |
| 25 | (Algeria) | Samy Benchamma | DM | 1 | 0 | 1 |
| Own Goals | | | | 0 | 0 | 0 |
| Totals | | | | 13 | 0 | 13 |

=== Clean sheets ===
As of 13 November 2026

Includes all competitive matches.

| | | | | | Clean sheets | | |
| No. | Nat | Name | GP | GA | L1 | AC | Total |
|---|---|---|---|---|---|---|---|
| 16 | (Algeria) | Alexis Guendouz | 9 | 3 | 6 | 0 | 6 |
| 30 | (Algeria) | Seif Benrabah | 0 | 0 | 0 | 0 | 0 |
| | | TOTALS | | 3 | 6 | 0 | 6 |
