= 2026–27 CR Témouchent season =

CR Témouchent
2026–27 season
- President: Houari Talbi
- Head coach: Moustapha Djallit
- Stadium: Omar Oucief Stadium
- Ligue 1: 9th
- Algerian Cup: Round of 64

The 2026–27 season, is CR Témouchent's 1st season in the top flight of Algerian football. In addition to the domestic league, CR Témouchent are participating in this season's editions of the Algerian Cup.

== Squad list ==
Players and squad numbers last updated on 31 August 2026.
Note: Flags indicate national team as has been defined under FIFA eligibility rules. Players may hold more than one non-FIFA nationality.

No.	Nat.	Name	Position	Date of Birth (Age)	Signed from
Goalkeepers
1	(Algeria)	Faris Boukerrit	GK	9 March 1998 (aged 26)	(Algeria) JS Djijel
16	(Algeria)	Abdelkader Morcely	GK	7 September 1995 (aged 30)	(Algeria) USM Khenchela
30	(Algeria)	Amine Saou	GK	29 May 1995 (aged 31)	(Algeria) JS Bordj Ménaïel
Defenders
2	(Algeria)	Mohamed Ali Larbi	RB	2 October 1995 (aged 30)	(Algeria) ASM Oran
3	(Algeria)	Wael Guerroudja	CB	15 December 2005 (aged 20)	(Algeria) USM Khenchela
4	(Algeria)	Islam Chahrour	CB	20 March 1990 (aged 36)	(Algeria) ES Ben Aknoun
5	(Algeria)	Safieddine Atmania	CB	26 February 2005 (aged 21)	(Algeria) USM Alger
14	(Algeria)	Boubakar Baouche	LB	29 October 2001 (aged 24)	(Algeria) RC Kouba
21	(Algeria)	Abdellah Meddah	RB	8 March 1999 (aged 27)	(Algeria) MC El Bayadh
23	(Algeria)	Abdelhak Belkacemi	LB	27 July 1992 (aged 34)	(Algeria) US Biskra
25	(Algeria)	Hamad Boutamina	CB	13 July 1997 (aged 29)	(Algeria) AS Khroub
28	(Algeria)	Lahcene Bouziane	CB	26 September 1996 (aged 29)	(Algeria) USM El Harrach
Midfielders
6	(Algeria)	Seddik Senhadji	DM	3 November 2000 (aged 25)	(Algeria) MC El Bayadh
8	(Algeria)	Abderrahmane Berkoun	AM	13 March 2000 (aged 26)	(Libya) Abelashhar SC
12	(Algeria)	Redouane Bounoua	AM	1 November 1998 (aged 27)	(Algeria) ES Ben Aknoun
15	(Algeria)	Khathir Baaziz	DM	17 January 1995 (aged 31)	(Algeria) USM Annaba
17	(Algeria)	El Kacem Khodja	AM	8 February 2005 (aged 21)	(Algeria) ES Mostaganem
18	(Algeria)	Mohamed Zane	DM	15 July 2006 (aged 20)	(Algeria) Youth team
22	(Algeria)	Sid Ahmed Aissaoui	CM	11 January 2005 (aged 21)	(Algeria) MC Alger
24	(Egypt)	Seif Safaga	DM	3 April 2005 (aged 21)	(Egypt) ENPPI SC
26	(Algeria)	Imed Saihi	AM	11 August 2000 (aged 26)	(Algeria) RC Kouba
29	(Algeria)	Abdelkrim Hamri	DM	22 July 2006 (aged 20)	(Algeria) MC Saïda
Forwards
7	(Algeria)	Billel Bensaha	LW	18 February 1994 (aged 32)	(Algeria) USM El Harrach
9	(Egypt)	Mohamed Zaalouk	ST	5 March 2005 (aged 21)	(Egypt) Al Ahly SC
10	(Algeria)	Boumediene Freifer	RW	November 15, 1998 (aged 27)	(Algeria) ASM Oran
11	(Algeria)	Mehdi Hedroug	LW	11 October 2006 (aged 19)	(Algeria) MC Alger
13	(Algeria)	Naoufel Merdja	RW	18 August 2005 (aged 21)	(Algeria) MB Rouissat
19	(Algeria)	Abdelillah Barkat	ST	8 August 1996 (aged 30)	(Algeria) MC El Bayadh
20	(Algeria)	Nazim Itim	LW	10 January 1997 (aged 29)	(Algeria) GC Mascara
27	(Algeria)	Mohamed Toumi Sief	ST	7 September 1994 (aged 31)	(Algeria) ES Mostaganem

== Transfers ==
=== In ===
==== Summer ====
Date	Pos	Player	Moving from	Fee	Source
9 July 2026	GK	(Algeria) Abdelkader Morcely	USM Khenchela	Free transfer	
9 July 2026	CB	(Algeria) Islam Chahrour	ES Ben Aknoun	Free transfer	
9 July 2026	RB	(Algeria) Mohamed Ali Larbi	ASM Oran	Free transfer	
9 July 2026	DM	(Algeria) Khathir Baaziz	USM Annaba	Free transfer	
9 July 2026	AM	(Algeria) Abderrahmane Berkoun	(Libya) Abelashhar SC	Free transfer	
9 July 2026	DM	(Algeria) El Kacem Khodja	ES Mostaganem	Free transfer	
9 July 2026	RW	(Algeria) Boumediene Freifer	ASM Oran	Free transfer	
11 July 2026	ST	(Egypt) Mohamed Zaalouk	(Egypt) Al Ahly SC	Free transfer	
12 July 2026	DM	(Egypt) Seif Safaga	(Egypt) ENPPI SC	Loan	
13 July 2026	CB	(Algeria) Safieddine Atmania	USM Alger	Loan	
16 July 2026	LB	(Algeria) Abdelhak Belkacemi	US Biskra	Free transfer	
17 July 2026	AM	(Algeria) Redouane Bounoua	ES Ben Aknoun	Free transfer	
23 July 2026	ST	(Algeria) Abdelillah Barkat	MC El Bayadh	Free transfer	
24 July 2026	DM	(Algeria) Seddik Senhadji	MC El Bayadh	Free transfer	
29 July 2026	LW	(Algeria) Billel Bensaha	USM El Harrach	Free transfer	
29 July 2026	CB	(Algeria) Lahcene Bouziane	USM El Harrach	Free transfer	
22 August 2026	CM	(Algeria) Sid Ahmed Aissaoui	MC Alger	Free transfer	
22 August 2026	ST	(Algeria) Mohamed Toumi Sief	ES Mostaganem	Free transfer	
22 August 2026	LB	(Algeria) Boubakar Baouche	RC Kouba	Free transfer	
25 August 2026	LW	(Algeria) Mehdi Hedroug	MC Alger	Loan	
26 August 2026	RW	(Algeria) Naoufel Merdja	MB Rouissat	Free transfer	

=== Out ===
==== Summer ====
Date	Pos	Player	Moving to	Fee	Source
19 June 2026	AM	(Algeria) Ahmed Bouda	RC Kouba	Free transfer	
30 June 2026	ST	(Algeria) Ahmed Ghennam	MC Oran	Free transfer	
8 July 2026	LW	(Algeria) Said Fellahi	MSP Batna	Free transfer	
13 July 2026	LW	(Algeria) Elabed Beloufa	ASM Oran	Free transfer	
28 July 2026	ST	(Algeria) Belkacem Bourorga	NC Magra	Free transfer	
29 July 2026	GK	(Algeria) Mohamed Benmeddah	MO Béjaïa	Free transfer	

=== New contracts ===
No.	Pos	Player	Contract length	Contract end	Date	Source
30	GK	Amine Saou	2 years	2028	9 July 2026	
25	CB	Hamad Boutamina	2 years	2028	9 July 2026	
20	LW	Nazim Itim	2 years	2028	9 July 2026	

== Competitions ==
=== Overview ===
Competition	Record								Started round	Final position / round	First match	Last match
Competition	G	W	D	L	GF	GA	GD	Win %	Started round	Final position / round	First match	Last match
Ligue 1	10	2	5	3	7	10	−3	20.00	—N/a	To be confirmed	5 September 2026	In Progress
Algerian Cup	0	0	0	0	0	0	+0	—	Round of 64	To be confirmed	December 2026	In Progress
Total	10	2	5	3	7	10	−3	20.00				

Updated to match played 18 November 2026
Source: Competitions

=== Ligue 1 ===
==== League table ====
Pos	Team	Pld	W	D	L	GF	GA	GD	Pts
7	Olympique Akbou	8	3	3	2	9	6	+3	12
8	JS El Biar	10	3	3	4	13	12	+1	12
9	CR Témouchent	10	2	5	3	7	10	−3	11
10	CS Constantine	10	3	1	6	12	18	−6	10
11	ES Sétif	8	2	3	3	10	8	+2	9

Updated to match(es) played on 18 November 2026. Source: lfp.dz
Rules for classification: 1) Points; 2) Head-to-head points; 3) Head-to-head goal difference; 4) First half goal difference; 5) First half total goals; 6) Fairplay ranking; 7) Playoff.

==== Results summary ====
Overall								Home						Away					
Pld	W	D	L	GF	GA	GD	Pts	W	D	L	GF	GA	GD	W	D	L	GF	GA	GD
10	2	5	3	7	10	−3	11	1	4	1	4	5	−1	1	1	2	3	5	−2

Last updated: 18 November 2026.
Source: Competitive matches

==== Results by round ====
Round	1	2	3	4	5	6	7	8	9	10	11	12	13	14	15	16	17	18	19	20	21	22	23	24	25	26	27	28	29	30
Ground	H	A	H	A	H	H	A	H	A	H	A	H	A	H	A	A	H	A	H	A	A	H	A	H	A	H	A	H	A	H
Result	D	L	W	L	L	D	W	D	D	D																				
Position	7																													

Updated to match(es) played on 18 November 2026. Source: Competitive matches
A = Away; H = Home; W = Win; D = Draw; L = Loss

==== Matches ====
The league fixtures were announced on 3 August 2026.

All times are local, WAT (UTC+1).

Win Draw Loss Postponed

5 September 2026 Round 1	CR Témouchent	1–1	CS Constantine	Aïn Témouchent
19:00	Freifer 5'	Flashscore; LFP	L'Ghoul 69'	Stadium: Omar Oucief Stadium; Referee: Anes Azrine

11 September 2026 Round 2	MC Oran	2–0	CR Témouchent	Bir El Djir
19:00	Kerroum 81' (pen.); Bourdim 90+2'	Flashscore; LFP		Stadium: Miloud Hadefi Stadium; Referee: Mehdi Oukil

17 September 2026 Round 3	CR Témouchent	1–0	JS Kabylie	Aïn Témouchent
20:00	Chahrour 73'	Flashscore; LFP		Stadium: Omar Oucief Stadium; Referee: Mustapha Ghorbal

9 October 2026 Round 4	MC Alger	1–0	CR Témouchent	Douéra
20:00	Kohili 77'	Flashscore; LFP		Stadium: Ali La Pointe Stadium; Referee: Tahar Boudjemaa

14 October 2026 Round 5	CR Témouchent	0–2	MB Rouissat	Aïn Témouchent
18:00		Flashscore; LFP	Fatawu 30'; Amokrane 75'	Stadium: Omar Oucief Stadium; Referee: Yahia Dehar

18 October 2026 Round 6	CR Témouchent	1–1	ASO Chlef	Aïn Témouchent
17:45	Hedroug 53'	Flashscore; LFP	Diakité 68'	Stadium: Omar Oucief Stadium; Referee: Fateh Harkat

24 October 2026 Round 7	ES Sétif	1–2	CR Témouchent	Sétif
19:00	Benayad 90+2'	Flashscore; LFP	Zaalouk 15'; Baouche 83'	Stadium: 8 May 1945 Stadium; Referee: Haitham Ghouti

2 November 2026 Round 8	CR Témouchent	1–1	US Biskra	Aïn Témouchent
17:45	Saihi 72'	Flashscore; LFP	Belkhadem 34'	Stadium: Omar Oucief Stadium; Referee: Rafiq Aouina

8 November 2026 Round 9	USM Khenchela	1–1	CR Témouchent	Khenchela
14:00	Askar 90'	Flashscore; LFP	Itim 60'	Stadium: Amar Hamam Stadium; Referee: Youcef Abane

18 November 2026 Round 10	CR Témouchent	0–0	JS El Biar	Aïn Témouchent
17:45		Flashscore; LFP		Stadium: Omar Oucief Stadium; Referee: Mehdi Oukil

1 December 2026 Round 11	Olympique Akbou	–	CR Témouchent	Akbou
14:00		Flashscore; LFP		Stadium: Martyrs Stadium

Round 12	CR Témouchent	–	USM Alger	Aïn Témouchent
:		Flashscore; LFP		Stadium: Omar Oucief Stadium

Round 13	JS Saoura	–	CR Témouchent	Béchar
:		Flashscore; LFP		Stadium: 20 August 1955 Stadium

Round 14	CR Témouchent	–	ES Ben Aknoun	Aïn Témouchent
:		Flashscore; LFP		Stadium: Omar Oucief Stadium

Round 15	CR Belouizdad	–	CR Témouchent	Baraki
:		Flashscore; LFP		Stadium: Nelson Mandela Stadium

Round 16	CS Constantine	–	CR Témouchent	Constantine
:		Flashscore; LFP		Stadium: Chahid Hamlaoui Stadium

Round 17	CR Témouchent	–	MC Oran	Aïn Témouchent
:		Flashscore; LFP		Stadium: Omar Oucief Stadium

Round 18	JS Kabylie	–	CR Témouchent	Tizi Ouzou
:		Flashscore; LFP		Stadium: Hocine Aït Ahmed Stadium

Round 19	CR Témouchent	–	MC Alger	Aïn Témouchent
:		Flashscore; LFP		Stadium: Omar Oucief Stadium

Round 20	MB Rouissat	–	CR Témouchent	Ouargla
:		Flashscore; LFP		Stadium: 18 February Stadium

Round 21	ASO Chlef	–	CR Témouchent	Chlef
:		Flashscore; LFP		Stadium: Mohamed Boumezrag Stadium

Round 22	CR Témouchent	–	ES Sétif	Aïn Témouchent
:		Flashscore; LFP		Stadium: Omar Oucief Stadium

Round 23	US Biskra	–	CR Témouchent	Zeribet El Oued
:		Flashscore; LFP		Stadium: Bouhafs Chabi Stadium

Round 24	CR Témouchent	–	USM Khenchela	Aïn Témouchent
:		Flashscore; LFP		Stadium: Omar Oucief Stadium

Round 25	JS El Biar	–	CR Témouchent	Blida
:		Flashscore; LFP		Stadium: Mustapha Tchaker Stadium

Round 26	CR Témouchent	–	Olympique Akbou	Aïn Témouchent
:		Flashscore; LFP		Stadium: Omar Oucief Stadium

Round 27	USM Alger	–	CR Témouchent	Algiers
:		Flashscore; LFP		Stadium: Stade du 5 Juillet

Round 28	CR Témouchent	–	JS Saoura	Aïn Témouchent
:		Flashscore; LFP		Stadium: Omar Oucief Stadium

Round 29	ES Ben Aknoun	–	CR Témouchent	Belouizdad
:		Flashscore; LFP		Stadium: 20 August 1955 Stadium

Round 30	CR Témouchent	–	CR Belouizdad	Aïn Témouchent
		Flashscore; LFP		Stadium: Omar Oucief Stadium

=== Algerian Cup ===
December 2026 Round of 64	–
:

== Squad information ==
=== Appearances and goals ===
As of 18 November 2026

No.	Pos	Player	Nat	Ligue 1			Algerian Cup			Total		
No.	Pos	Player	Nat	App	St	G	App	St	G	App	St	G
Goalkeepers
1	GK	Faris Boukerrit	(Algeria)	5	5	0	0	0	0	0	0	0
16	GK	Abdelkader Morcely	(Algeria)	3	3	0	0	0	0	0	0	0
30	GK	Amine Saou	(Algeria)	2	2	0	0	0	0	0	0	0
Defenders
2	RB	Mohamed Ali Larbi	(Algeria)	9	8	0	0	0	0	0	0	0
3	CB	Wael Guerroudja	(Algeria)	1	0	0	0	0	0	0	0	0
4	CB	Islam Chahrour	(Algeria)	10	10	1	0	0	0	0	0	0
5	CB	Safieddine Atamnia	(Algeria)	0	0	0	0	0	0	0	0	0
14	LB	Boubakar Baouche	(Algeria)	10	10	1	0	0	0	0	0	0
21	RB	Abdellah Meddah	(Algeria)	8	7	0	0	0	0	0	0	0
23	LB	Abdelhak Belkacemi	(Algeria)	4	0	0	0	0	0	0	0	0
25	CB	Hamad Boutamina	(Algeria)	6	5	0	0	0	0	0	0	0
28	CB	Lahcene Bouziane	(Algeria)	6	5	0	0	0	0	0	0	0
Midfielders
6	DM	Seddik Senhadji	(Algeria)	8	7	0	0	0	0	0	0	0
8	AM	Abderrahmane Berkoun	(Algeria)	4	2	0	0	0	0	0	0	0
12	AM	Redouane Bounoua	(Algeria)	5	3	0	0	0	0	0	0	0
15	DM	Khathir Baaziz	(Algeria)	6	3	0	0	0	0	0	0	0
17	AM	El Kacem Khodja	(Algeria)	0	0	0	0	0	0	0	0	0
18	DM	Mohamed Zane	(Algeria)	0	0	0	0	0	0	0	0	0
22	CM	Sid Ahmed Aissaoui	(Algeria)	7	1	0	0	0	0	0	0	0
24	DM	Seif Safaga	(Egypt)	5	1	0	0	0	0	0	0	0
26	AM	Imed Saihi	(Algeria)	10	10	1	0	0	0	0	0	0
29	DM	Abdelkrim Hamri	(Algeria)	3	0	0	0	0	0	0	0	0
Forwards
7	LW	Billel Bensaha	(Algeria)	3	2	0	0	0	0	0	0	0
9	ST	Mohamed Zaalouk	(Egypt)	8	7	1	0	0	0	0	0	0
10	RW	Boumediene Freifer	(Algeria)	4	4	1	0	0	0	0	0	0
11	LW	Mehdi Hedroug	(Algeria)	5	5	1	0	0	0	0	0	0
13	RW	Naoufel Merdja	(Algeria)	6	2	0	0	0	0	0	0	0
19	ST	Abdelillah Barkat	(Algeria)	6	2	0	0	0	0	0	0	0
20	LW	Nazim Itim	(Algeria)	9	2	1	0	0	0	0	0	0
27	ST	Mohamed Toumi Sief	(Algeria)	4	1	0	0	0	0	0	0	0
Total				10		7	0		0	0		0

Last updated: 18 November 2026
Source: soccerway.com

=== Goalscorers ===
As of 18 November 2026

Includes all competitive matches.

No.	Nat.	Player	Pos.	L1	AC	TOTAL
10	(Algeria)	Boumediene Freifer	RW	1	0	1
4	(Algeria)	Islam Chahrour	CB	1	0	1
11	(Algeria)	Mehdi Hedroug	LW	1	0	1
9	(Egypt)	Mohamed Zaalouk	ST	1	0	1
14	(Algeria)	Boubakar Baouche	LB	1	0	1
26	(Algeria)	Imed Saihi	AM	1	0	1
20	(Algeria)	Nazim Itim	LW	1	0	1
Own Goals				0	0	0
Totals				7	0	7

=== Clean sheets ===
As of 18 November 2026

Includes all competitive matches.

					Clean sheets		
No.	Nat	Name	GP	GA	L1	AC	Total
1	(Algeria)	Faris Boukerrit	5	4	1	0	1
16	(Algeria)	Abdelkader Morcely	3	3	1	0	1
30	(Algeria)	Amine Saou	2	3	0	0	0
		TOTALS		10	2	0	2
