= 2022–23 MC El Bayadh season =

MC El Bayadh
2022–23 season
- President: Abdelkader Dahmani
- Head coach: Abdelhakem Benslimane (until 2 October 2022); Cherif Hadjar (from 9 October 2022)
- Stadium: Zakaria Medjdoub Stadium
- Ligue 1: 3rd
- Algerian Cup: Round of 32
- Top goalscorer: League: Ahmed Ghenam (6 goals); All: Ahmed Ghenam; Ramdane Hitala (6 goals)
- Biggest win: HB Chelghoum Laïd 0–6 MC El Bayadh
- Biggest defeat: RC Arbaâ 3–1 MC El Bayadh; CS Constantine 3–1 MC El Bayadh; JS Kabylie 3–1 MC El Bayadh; MC El Bayadh 1–3 CR Belouizdad
| Home colours | Away colours |

The 2022–23 season, was MC El Bayadh's first ever season in the top flight of Algerian football. In addition to the domestic league, MC El Bayadh participated in the Algerian Cup.

== Squad list ==
Players and squad numbers last updated on 5 February 2023.
Note: Flags indicate national team as has been defined under FIFA eligibility rules. Players may hold more than one non-FIFA nationality.

| No. | Nat. | Position | Name | Date of Birth (Age) | Signed from |
Goalkeepers
| 1 | (Algeria) | GK | Abdelkader Morcely | 17 September 1995 (aged 27) | (Algeria) HB Chelghoum Laïd |
| 16 | (Algeria) | GK | Zakaria Bouziani | 28 August 1996 (aged 26) | (Algeria) JS Saoura |
Defenders
| 2 | (Algeria) | CB | Abdeldjalil Bahoussi | 5 August 1993 (aged 29) | (Algeria) JS Saoura |
| 5 | (Algeria) | CB | Mohamed El Amine Barka | 20 March 1993 (aged 29) | (Algeria) RC Relizane |
| 13 | (Algeria) | LB | Abdessamad Bounaama | 26 February 1994 (aged 28) | (Algeria) |
| 14 | (Algeria) | CB | Adel Amaouche | 4 November 1999 (aged 23) | (Algeria) MO Béjaïa |
| 15 | (Algeria) | CB | Azzedine Berriah | 16 June 1999 (aged 23) | (Algeria) |
| 21 | (Algeria) | CB | Belaid Kouar | 13 December 1989 (aged 33) | (Algeria) OMR El Annasser |
| 24 | (Algeria) | RB | Walid Alati | 1 August 1991 (aged 31) | (Algeria) MC Oran |
Midfielders
| 6 | (Algeria) | MF | Omar Embarek | 11 November 1998 (aged 24) | (Algeria) CR Témouchent |
| 8 | (Algeria) | MF | El Amine Antar | 22 October 1991 (aged 31) | (Algeria) JSM Tiaret |
| 10 | (Algeria) | MF | Naïm Kirioui | 2 September 1997 (aged 25) | (Algeria) MCB Oued Sly |
| 18 | (Algeria) | MF | Djamel Belalem | 12 August 1993 (aged 29) | (Algeria) WA Tlemcen |
| 22 | (Algeria) | MF | Nacer Benzid | 20 February 2001 (aged 21) | (Algeria) |
Forwards
| 3 | (Algeria) | FW | Ahmed Ghenam | 31 March 1998 (aged 24) | (Algeria) |
| 7 | (Algeria) | FW | Imad Moussaoui | 26 November 2000 (aged 22) | (Algeria) JS Saoura |
| 9 | (Algeria) | FW | Ramdane Hitala | 8 February 1995 (aged 27) | (Algeria) NC Magra |
| 11 | (Algeria) | FW | Mohammed Brahimi | 23 November 1997 (aged 25) | (Algeria) MC Saïda |
| 12 | (Algeria) | FW | Abou Sofiane Balegh | 17 August 1988 (aged 34) | (Algeria) RC Relizane |
| 17 | (Algeria) | FW | Mohamed El Amine Belmokhtar | 16 April 1995 (aged 27) | (Libya) Olympic Azzaweya |
| 19 | (Algeria) | FW | Abdelillah Barkat | 8 August 1996 (aged 26) | (Algeria) RC Relizane |
| 20 | (Algeria) | FW | Hicham Khalfallah | 2 October 1991 (aged 31) | (Algeria) CR Belouizdad |
| 25 | (Algeria) | ST | Zakaria Boulahia | 1 June 1997 (aged 25) | (United Arab Emirates) Emirates |

== Transfers ==
=== In ===
==== Summer ====
| Date | Pos | Player | From club | Transfer fee | Source |
|---|---|---|---|---|---|
| 21 July 2022 | FW | (Algeria) Abdelillah Barkat | RC Relizane | Free transfer | |
| 13 August 2022 | FW | (Algeria) Abou Sofiane Balegh | RC Relizane | Free transfer | |
| 17 August 2022 | RB | (Algeria) Walid Alati | MC Oran | Free transfer | |

==== Winter ====
| Date | Pos | Player | From club | Transfer fee | Source |
|---|---|---|---|---|---|
| 26 January 2023 | FW | (Algeria) Mohamed El Amine Belmokhtar | (Libya) Olympic Azzaweya | Free transfer | |
| 1 February 2023 | FW | (Algeria) Hicham Khalfallah | CR Belouizdad | Loan | |
| 1 February 2023 | FW | (Algeria) Zakaria Boulahia | (United Arab Emirates) Emirates | Free transfer | |
| 1 February 2023 | GK | (Algeria) Abdelkader Morcely | HB Chelghoum Laïd | Free transfer | |

=== Out ===
==== Winter ====
| Date | Pos | Player | To club | Transfer fee | Source |
|---|---|---|---|---|---|
| 3 January 2023 | GK | (Algeria) Mohamed Réda Younes | Unattached | Released | |
| 3 January 2023 | DF | (Algeria) Abdelkrim Allaoui | Unattached | Released | |
| 3 January 2023 | DF | (Algeria) Abdelhak Bechina | Unattached | Released | |
| 3 January 2023 | FW | (Algeria) Sofiane Abdellaoui | Unattached | Released | |
| 3 January 2023 | FW | (Algeria) Abdelkader Ghorab | Unattached | Released | |
| 28 January 2023 | MF | (Algeria) Sid Ahmed Matallah | JS Kabylie | Free transfer | |
| 1 February 2023 | LB | (Algeria) Younes Ouassaa | Unattached | Released | |
| 1 February 2023 | FW | (Algeria) Nadji Benkheira | Unattached | Released | |

== Competitions ==
=== Overview ===
| Competition | Record | | | | | | | | Started round | Final position / round | First match | Last match |
| Competition | G | W | D | L | GF | GA | GD | Win % | Started round | Final position / round | First match | Last match |
|---|---|---|---|---|---|---|---|---|---|---|---|---|
| Ligue 1 | 30 | 13 | 7 | 10 | 34 | 25 | +9 | 43.33 | —N/a | 4th | 27 August 2022 | 15 July 2023 |
| Algerian Cup | 2 | 1 | 0 | 1 | 4 | 4 | +0 | 50.00 | Round of 64 | Round of 32 | 25 November 2022 | 17 December 2022 |
| Total | 32 | 14 | 7 | 11 | 38 | 29 | +9 | 43.75 | | | | |

Updated to match played 15 July 2023
Source: Competitions

== League table ==
| Pos | Team | Pld | W | D | L | GF | GA | GD | Pts | Qualification or relegation |
|---|---|---|---|---|---|---|---|---|---|---|
| 2 | CS Constantine | 30 | 14 | 8 | 8 | 39 | 26 | +13 | 50 | Qualification for CAF Champions League |
| 3 | MC Alger | 30 | 12 | 11 | 7 | 21 | 20 | +1 | 47 | |
| 4 | MC El Bayadh | 30 | 13 | 7 | 10 | 34 | 25 | +9 | 46 | |
| 5 | JS Saoura | 30 | 11 | 9 | 10 | 32 | 25 | +7 | 42 | |
| 6 | ES Sétif | 30 | 11 | 9 | 10 | 38 | 32 | +6 | 42 | |

Updated to match(es) played on 15 July 2023. Source: the-sports.org
Rules for classification: 1) points; 2) head-to-head points; 3) head-to-head goal difference; 4) goal difference; 5) total goals; 6) fairplay ranking; 7) playoff.

=== Results summary ===
| Overall | | | | | | | | Home | | | | | | Away | | | | | |
| Pld | W | D | L | GF | GA | GD | Pts | W | D | L | GF | GA | GD | W | D | L | GF | GA | GD |
|---|---|---|---|---|---|---|---|---|---|---|---|---|---|---|---|---|---|---|---|
| 30 | 13 | 7 | 10 | 34 | 25 | +9 | 46 | 9 | 5 | 1 | 20 | 7 | +13 | 4 | 2 | 9 | 14 | 18 | −4 |

Last updated: 15 July 2023.
Source: Competitive matches

=== Results by round ===
| Round | 1 | 2 | 3 | 4 | 5 | 6 | 7 | 8 | 9 | 10 | 11 | 12 | 13 | 14 | 15 | 16 | 17 | 18 | 19 | 20 | 21 | 22 | 23 | 24 | 25 | 26 | 27 | 28 | 29 | 30 |
|---|---|---|---|---|---|---|---|---|---|---|---|---|---|---|---|---|---|---|---|---|---|---|---|---|---|---|---|---|---|---|
| Ground | A | H | H | A | H | A | H | A | H | A | H | A | H | A | H | H | A | A | H | A | H | A | H | A | H | A | H | A | H | A |
| Result | L | W | W | L | D | L | W | L | D | L | D | D | W | L | W | D | L | W | D | L | W | W | W | W | L | D | W | W | W | L |
| Position | 12 | 7 | 5 | 6 | 7 | 8 | 7 | 10 | 12 | 13 | 11 | 12 | 10 | 13 | 11 | 11 | 13 | 11 | 12 | 12 | 9 | 9 | 7 | 6 | 7 | 7 | 6 | 3 | 3 | 4 |

Updated to match(es) played on 15 July 2023. Source: Competitive matches
A = Away; H = Home; W = Win; D = Draw; L = Loss

=== Matches ===
The league fixtures were announced on 19 July 2022.

| 27 August 2022 Round 1 | USM Alger | 1–0 | MC El Bayadh | Dar El Beïda |
| 17:00 | Merbah 41' | Report | | Stadium: Omar Benrabah Stadium; Referee: Youcef Gamouh |

| 3 September 2022 Round 2 | MC El Bayadh | 2–0 | JS Saoura | El Bayadh |
| 17:00 | Moussaoui 45+3' (pen.); Ghorab 75' | Report | | Stadium: Zakaria Medjdoub Stadium; Referee: Abdelali Ibrir |

| 3 September 2022 Round 3 | MC El Bayadh | 2–0 | USM Khenchela | El Bayadh |
| 17:00 | Moussaoui 6' (pen.); Ghennam 77' | Report | | Stadium: Zakaria Medjdoub Stadium; Referee: Marouane Mohamed Belkebir |

| 16 September 2022 Round 4 | US Biskra | 1–0 | MC El Bayadh | Biskra |
| 20:00 | Abid 78' | Report | | Stadium: 18 February Stadium; Referee: Akram Mechairia |

| 24 September 2022 Round 5 | MC El Bayadh | 0–0 | JS Kabylie | El Bayadh |
| 16:30 | | Report | | Stadium: Zakaria Medjdoub Stadium; Referee: Mohamed Bouteraa |

| 30 September 2022 Round 6 | RC Arbaâ | 3–1 | MC El Bayadh | Larbaâ |
| 16:00 | Saidani 12'; Taib 45+1'; Boubakour 55' | Report | Hitala 60' | Stadium: Ismaïl Makhlouf Stadium; Referee: Zine Abedine Dakhane |

| 8 October 2022 Round 7 | MC El Bayadh | 1–0 | HB Chelghoum Laïd | El Bayadh |
| 15:00 | Balegh 73' (pen.) | Report | | Stadium: Zakaria Medjdoub Stadium; Referee: Mehdi Oukil |

| 15 October 2022 Round 8 | NC Magra | 1–0 | MC El Bayadh | Magra |
| 15:00 | Ziouache 28' | Report | | Stadium: Boucheligue Brothers Stadium; Referee: Ali Nader |

| 21 October 2022 Round 9 | MC El Bayadh | 0–0 | Paradou AC | El Bayadh |
| 15:00 | | Report | | Stadium: Zakaria Medjdoub Stadium; Referee: Abdelmoumen Touabti |

| 5 November 2022 Round 10 | CR Belouizdad | 1–0 | MC El Bayadh | Belouizdad |
| 15:00 | Bourdim 90+5' (pen.) | Report | | Stadium: 20 August 1955 Stadium; Referee: Rafik Aouina |

| 12 November 2022 Round 11 | MC El Bayadh | 1–1 | MC Oran | El Bayadh |
| 15:00 | Barkat 45' | Report | Belaribi 49' | Stadium: Zakaria Medjdoub Stadium; Referee: Hamza Bouslimani |

| 29 November 2022 Round 12 | ASO Chlef | 0–0 | MC El Bayadh | Relizane |
| 15:00 | | Report | | Stadium: Tahar Zoughari Stadium; Referee: Lotfi Bekouassa |

| 7 December 2022 Round 13 | MC El Bayadh | 2–0 | ES Sétif | El Bayadh |
| 15:00 | Barkat 47'; Moussaoui 60' | Report | | Stadium: Zakaria Medjdoub Stadium; Referee: Lyes Bekouassa |

| 11 December 2022 Round 14 | CS Constantine | 3–1 | MC El Bayadh | Constantine |
| 15:00 | Dib 45+5'; Aiboud 66', 75' | Report | Hitala 8' | Stadium: Ramadane Ben Abdelmalek Stadium; Referee: Zinelaabidine Dakhane |

| 24 December 2022 Round 15 | MC El Bayadh | 1–0 | MC Alger | El Bayadh |
| 14:30 | Ghennam 9' | Report | | Stadium: Zakaria Medjdoub Stadium; Referee: Abdelmoumen Touabti |

| 19 February 2023 Round 17 | JS Saoura | 2–0 | MC El Bayadh | Béchar |
| 17:00 | Bellatreche 17' (pen.); Lahmeri 49' | Report | | Stadium: 20 August 1955 Stadium; Referee: Ali Nader |

| 25 February 2023 Round 18 | USM Khenchela | 0–1 | MC El Bayadh | Khenchela |
| 15:00 | | Report | Belmokhtar 39' | Stadium: Amar Hamam Stadium; Referee: Lotfi Bekouassa |

| 3 March 2023 Round 16 | MC El Bayadh | 0–0 | USM Alger | El Bayadh |
| 15:00 | | Report | | Stadium: Zakaria Medjdoub Stadium; Referee: Youcef Gamouh |

| 10 March 2023 Round 19 | MC El Bayadh | 1–1 | US Biskra | El Bayadh |
| 15:00 | Benzid 45+1' | Report | Abid 90' (pen.) | Stadium: Zakaria Medjdoub Stadium; Referee: Lyes Bekouassa |

| 31 March 2023 Round 21 | MC El Bayadh | 3–1 | RC Arbaâ | El Bayadh |
| 15:45 | Hitala 7'; Ghennam 61'; Belalem 90+4' | Report | Toumi 14' (pen.) | Stadium: Zakaria Medjdoub Stadium; Referee: Abdelali Ibrir |

| 9 April 2023 Round 22 | HB Chelghoum Laïd | 0–6 | MC El Bayadh | Chelghoum Laïd |
| 15:45 | | Report | Khalfallah 14'; Ghennam 45+1', 54'; Belmokhtar 51'; Bounaama 61', 73' | Stadium: 11 December 1961 Stadium; Referee: Elhadj Chihaoui |

| 13 May 2023 Round 20 | JS Kabylie | 3–1 | MC El Bayadh | Tizi Ouzou |
| 18:00 | Boualia 8'; Mouaki 40'; Boukhanchouche 76' (pen.) | Report | Hitala 55' | Stadium: 1 November 1954 Stadium; Referee: Nabil Boukhalfa |

| 18 May 2023 Round 23 | MC El Bayadh | 1–0 | NC Magra | El Bayadh |
| 16:00 | Balegh 83' | Report | | Stadium: Zakaria Medjdoub Stadium; Referee: Billel Soltani |

| 31 May 2023 Round 24 | Paradou AC | 0–1 | MC El Bayadh | Dar El Beïda |
| 16:00 | | Report | Benzid 36' (pen.) | Stadium: Omar Benrabah Stadium; Referee: Abdelali Ibrir |

| 6 June 2023 Round 25 | MC El Bayadh | 1–3 | CR Belouizdad | El Bayadh |
| 16:30 | Khalfallah 14' | Report | Wamba 6', 64' (pen.); Belkhir 75' | Stadium: Zakaria Medjdoub Stadium; Referee: Lahlou Benbraham |

| 1 July 2023 Round 26 | MC Oran | 1–1 | MC El Bayadh | Oran |
| 17:00 | Benamara 63' | Report | Khalfallah 79' | Stadium: Ahmed Zabana Stadium; Referee: Anes Azrine |

| 4 July 2023 Round 27 | MC El Bayadh | 2–0 | ASO Chlef | El Bayadh |
| 17:00 | Ghennam 53'; Barkat 67' | Report | | Stadium: Zakaria Medjdoub Stadium; Referee: Lyes Bekouassa |

| 7 July 2023 Round 28 | ES Sétif | 1–2 | MC El Bayadh | Sétif |
| 17:15 | Yattou 23' | Report | Barkat 43'; Amaouche 65' | Stadium: 8 May 1945 Stadium; Referee: Zinelaabidine Dakhane |

| 10 July 2023 Round 29 | MC El Bayadh | 3–1 | CS Constantine | El Bayadh |
| 17:15 | Khalfallah 18'; Barka 34'; Hitala 60' | Report | Dib 12' (pen.) | Stadium: Zakaria Medjdoub Stadium; Referee: Hamza Bouslimani |

| 15 July 2023 Round 30 | MC Alger | 1–0 | MC El Bayadh | Dar El Beïda |
| 17:15 | Tahar 65' (pen.) | Report | | Stadium: Omar Benrabah Stadium; Referee: Mohamed Amine Benzohra |

== Algerian Cup ==
| 25 November 2022 Round of 64 | MSP Batna | 1–2 | MC El Bayadh | Batna |
| 14:00 | Hadroug 77' | Report | Barkat 8'; Hitala 28' | Stadium: 1 November 1954 Stadium; Referee: Radouane Allou |
Note: Lineups for MC El Bayadh - Younes, Berriah (Bechina, 65'), Bounaama, Bahhoussi, Barka, Mbarek (Hakkoum, 65'), Antar (Amaouche, 83'), Belalem, Balegh, Barkat (Benkheira, 65'), Hitala (Ghennam, 74').

| 17 December 2022 Round of 32 | Olympique Akbou | 3–2 | MC El Bayadh | Akbou |
| 14:00 | Rahal 34'; Renai 67'; Berkane 84' | Report | Benzid 8'; Balegh 81' (pen.) | Stadium: 1 November 1954 Stadium; Referee: Youcef Gamouh |
Note: Lineups for MC El Bayadh - Younes, Allati, Brahimi, Bahhoussi, Barka, Mbarek (Matallah, 74'), Ghorab, Belalem (Antar, 87'), Benzid, Moussaoui, Barkat. (Balegh, '),

== Squad information ==
=== Playing statistics ===
| No. | Pos | Nat | Player | Total | | Ligue 1 | | Algerian Cup | |
| No. | Pos | Nat | Player | Apps | Goals | Apps | Goals | Apps | Goals |
Goalkeepers
| 1 | GK | (Algeria) ALG | Abdelkader Morcely | 4 | 0 | 4 | 0 | 0 | 0 |
| 16 | GK | (Algeria) ALG | Zakaria Bouziani | 25 | 0 | 25 | 0 | 0 | 0 |
Defenders
| 2 | DF | (Algeria) ALG | Abdeldjalil Bahoussi | 19 | 0 | 17 | 0 | 2 | 0 |
| 5 | DF | (Algeria) ALG | Mohamed El Amine Barka | 31 | 1 | 29 | 1 | 2 | 0 |
| 13 | DF | (Algeria) ALG | Abdessamad Bounaama | 14 | 2 | 13 | 2 | 1 | 0 |
| 14 | DF | (Algeria) ALG | Adel Amaouche | 11 | 1 | 10 | 1 | 1 | 0 |
| 15 | DF | (Algeria) ALG | Azzedine Berriah | 18 | 0 | 17 | 0 | 1 | 0 |
| 21 | DF | (Algeria) ALG | Belaid Kouar | 26 | 0 | 26 | 0 | 0 | 0 |
| 24 | DF | (Algeria) ALG | Walid Alati | 20 | 0 | 19 | 0 | 1 | 0 |
Midfielders
| 6 | MF | (Algeria) ALG | Omar Embarek | 28 | 0 | 26 | 0 | 2 | 0 |
| 8 | MF | (Algeria) ALG | El Amine Antar | 14 | 0 | 12 | 0 | 2 | 0 |
| 10 | MF | (Algeria) ALG | Naïm Kirioui | 10 | 0 | 10 | 0 | 0 | 0 |
| 18 | MF | (Algeria) ALG | Djamel Belalem | 26 | 1 | 24 | 1 | 2 | 0 |
| 22 | MF | (Algeria) ALG | Nacer Benzid | 20 | 3 | 19 | 2 | 1 | 1 |
| 35 | MF | (Algeria) ALG | Abdelhamid Hakkoum | 10 | 0 | 9 | 0 | 1 | 0 |
Forwards
| 3 | FW | (Algeria) ALG | Ahmed Ghenam | 26 | 6 | 25 | 6 | 1 | 0 |
| 7 | FW | (Algeria) ALG | Imad Moussaoui | 21 | 3 | 20 | 3 | 1 | 0 |
| 9 | FW | (Nigeria) NGR | Ramdane Hitala | 27 | 5 | 26 | 4 | 1 | 1 |
| 11 | FW | (Algeria) ALG | Mohammed Brahimi | 25 | 0 | 24 | 0 | 1 | 0 |
| 12 | FW | (Algeria) ALG | Abou Sofiane Balegh | 25 | 3 | 23 | 2 | 2 | 1 |
| 17 | FW | (Algeria) ALG | Mohamed El Amine Belmokhtar | 11 | 2 | 11 | 2 | 0 | 0 |
| 19 | FW | (Algeria) ALG | Abdelillah Barkat | 26 | 5 | 24 | 4 | 2 | 1 |
| 20 | FW | (Algeria) ALG | Hicham Khalfallah | 13 | 5 | 13 | 5 | 0 | 0 |
| 25 | FW | (Algeria) ALG | Zakaria Boulahia | 6 | 0 | 6 | 0 | 0 | 0 |
Players transferred out during the season
| 1 | GK | (Algeria) ALG | Mohamed Réda Younes | 3 | 0 | 1 | 0 | 2 | 0 |
| 4 | DF | (Algeria) ALG | Abdelkrim Allaoui | 2 | 0 | 2 | 0 | 0 | 0 |
| 25 | DF | (Algeria) ALG | Abdelhak Bechina | 1 | 0 | 0 | 0 | 1 | 0 |
| 26 | DF | (Algeria) ALG | Younes Ouassaa | 6 | 0 | 6 | 0 | 0 | 0 |
| 20 | MF | (Algeria) ALG | Sid Ahmed Matallah | 10 | 0 | 9 | 0 | 1 | 0 |
| 17 | FW | (Algeria) ALG | Nadji Benkheira | 11 | 1 | 10 | 1 | 1 | 0 |
| 23 | FW | (Algeria) ALG | Sofiane Abdellaoui | 0 | 0 | 0 | 0 | 0 | 0 |
| 27 | FW | (Algeria) ALG | Abdelkader Ghorab | 14 | 1 | 13 | 1 | 1 | 0 |

Last updated: 15 July 2023
Source: soccerway.com

=== Goalscorers ===
As of 15 July 2023

Includes all competitive matches. The list is sorted alphabetically by surname when total goals are equal.

| No. | Nat. | Player | Pos. | L 1 | AC | TOTAL |
|---|---|---|---|---|---|---|
| 3 | (Algeria) | Ahmed Ghenam | FW | 6 | 0 | 6 |
| 9 | (Algeria) | Ramdane Hitala | FW | 5 | 1 | 6 |
| 19 | (Algeria) | Abdelillah Barkat | FW | 4 | 1 | 5 |
| 20 | (Algeria) | Hicham Khalfallah | FW | 4 | 0 | 4 |
| 7 | (Algeria) | Imad Moussaoui | FW | 3 | 0 | 3 |
| 12 | (Algeria) | Abou Sofiane Balegh | FW | 2 | 1 | 3 |
| 22 | (Algeria) | Nacer Benzid | MF | 2 | 1 | 3 |
| 17 | (Algeria) | Mohamed El Amine Belmokhtar | FW | 2 | 0 | 2 |
| 13 | (Algeria) | Abdessamad Bounaama | DF | 2 | 0 | 2 |
| 18 | (Algeria) | Djamel Belalem | MF | 1 | 0 | 1 |
| 27 | (Algeria) | Abdelkader Ghorab | FW | 1 | 0 | 1 |
| 14 | (Algeria) | Adel Amaouche | DF | 1 | 0 | 1 |
| 5 | (Algeria) | Mohamed El Amine Barka | DF | 1 | 0 | 1 |
| Own Goals | | | | 0 | 0 | 0 |
| Totals | | | | 34 | 4 | 38 |
