= Mohamed Zaalouk =

Egyptian footballer (born 2005)

Personal information
- Full name: Mohamed Ahmed Zaalouk
- Date of birth: 5 March 2005 (age 21)
- Place of birth: Cairo, Egypt
- Height: 1.82 m (6 ft 0 in)
- Position: Striker

Team information
- Current team: CR Témouchent
- Number: 9

Youth career
- 2016–2022: Wadi Degla
- 2022–: Al Ahly

Senior career*
Years	Team	Apps	(Gls)
2023–2026	Al Ahly	3	(0)
2024	→ Modern Sport FC (loan)	5	(0)
2026–	CR Témouchent	0	(0)

International career
2023–	Egypt U20	3	(1)
- * Club domestic league appearances and goals as of 3 September 2026

Mohamed Ahmed Zaalouk (Arabic: محمد زعلوك; born 5 March 2005) is an Egyptian professional footballer who plays as a Striker for Algerian Ligue Professionnelle 1 club CR Témouchent and the Egypt U20.

== Career ==
In January 2024, he was loaned to Modern Sport FC. On 11 July 2026, he joined Algerian club CR Témouchent.

== Honors and achievements ==
Al Ahly

- Egyptian Premier League: 2022–23
- CAF Champions League: 2023-24
