= Mohamed Bahlouli =

French footballer (born 2000)

Personal information
- Date of birth: 17 February 2000 (age 26)
- Place of birth: Lyon, France
- Height: 1.73 m (5 ft 8 in)
- Position: Midfielder

Team information
- Current team: US Biskra
- Number: 18

Youth career
- Lyon

Senior career*
Years	Team	Apps	(Gls)
2017–2018	Lyon B	8	(0)
2018–2021	Sampdoria	0	(0)
2020	→ Cosenza (loan)	7	(0)
2020–2021	→ Cosenza (loan)	24	(2)
2022	Kauno Žalgiris	24	(5)
2024	Pro Sesto	10	(0)
2026–	Saham Club	11	(0)
2026–	US Biskra	0	(0)
- * Club domestic league appearances and goals as of 31 August 2026

Mohamed Bahlouli (born 17 February 2000) is a French professional footballer who plays as a midfielder for Algerian Ligue Professionnelle 1 club US Biskra.

== Career ==
Bahlouli joined Serie B club Cosenza Calcio on loan from Sampdoria for the 2020–21 season having already spent the second half of the previous season there.

On 30 July 2021, he left Sampdoria by mutual consent.

In January 2022 he signed with Lithuanian club Kauno Žalgiris.

On 2 February 2024, Bahlouli returned to Italy and signed with Pro Sesto.

== Personal life ==
Born in France, Bahlouli is of Algerian descent. Bahlouli is the second eldest of four children in his family. He has two brothers and a sister, all of whom play football and formed at Olympique Lyonnais youth academy. His brother Farès is also a professional footballer who plays for Ukrainian Premier League club Dnipro-1, while his other brother Djibrail remains playing in Lyon youth team. His sister, Nesrine is playing for women Serie A side AC Milan.
