= Yannis Lagha =

Footballer (born 2004)

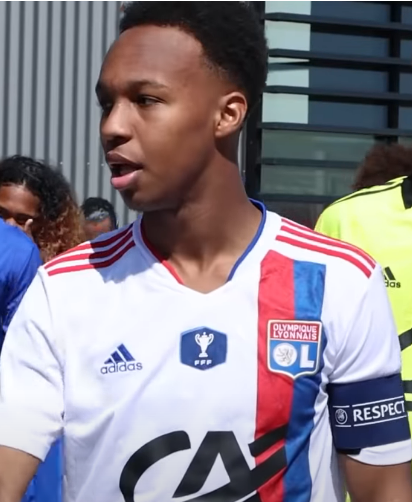
- Lagha in 2022

Personal information
- Full name: Yannis Alladoum Lagha
- Date of birth: 21 June 2004 (age 22)
- Place of birth: Lyon, France
- Height: 1.85 m (6 ft 1 in)
- Position: Striker

Team information
- Current team: JS Kabylie
- Number: 12

Youth career
- 2010–2012: AS Montchat Lyon
- 2012: US Annecy-le-Vieux
- 2012–2013: Montpellier
- 2013–2016: Etoile Sportive Trinité
- 2016–2022: Lyon

Senior career*
Years	Team	Apps	(Gls)
2022–2026	Lyon B	47	(6)
2026–	JS Kabylie	3	(0)

International career^{‡}
2021–2022	Algeria U18	2	(0)
- * Club domestic league appearances and goals as of 15:20, 24 October 2026 (UTC) ‡ National team caps and goals as of 16 March 2023

Yannis Alladoum Lagha (born 21 June 2004) is a professional footballer who plays as a striker for JS Kabylie. Born in France, he has represented Algeria at youth international level.

== Club career ==
Lagha joined Lyon in 2016. In 2022, he played in the U-19 level whom he was captained and won the Coupe Gambardella beating SM Caen.

He signed his first professional contract in June 2022, becoming the second player born in 2004 to sign a contract for Lyon.

On 31 August 2026, he joined JS Kabylie, signing a two-year contract with the Kabyle club. On 17 September 2026, with JS Kabylie, under the direction of head coach Karim Belhocine, Lagha made his professional debut in Ligue 1.

== International career ==
Lagha is eligible to represent either Algeria, France or the Central African Republic internationally.

After receiving call-ups from both Algeria and France, Lagha chose to play for Algeria. He started and captained on his debut for the Algeria U18 against France.

== Personal life ==
Born in France, Lagha is of Algerian and Central African Republic descent through his father and mother, respectively.

== Honours ==
Lyon U19

- Coupe Gambardella: 2021–22
