= Farès Bahlouli =

French footballer (born 1995)

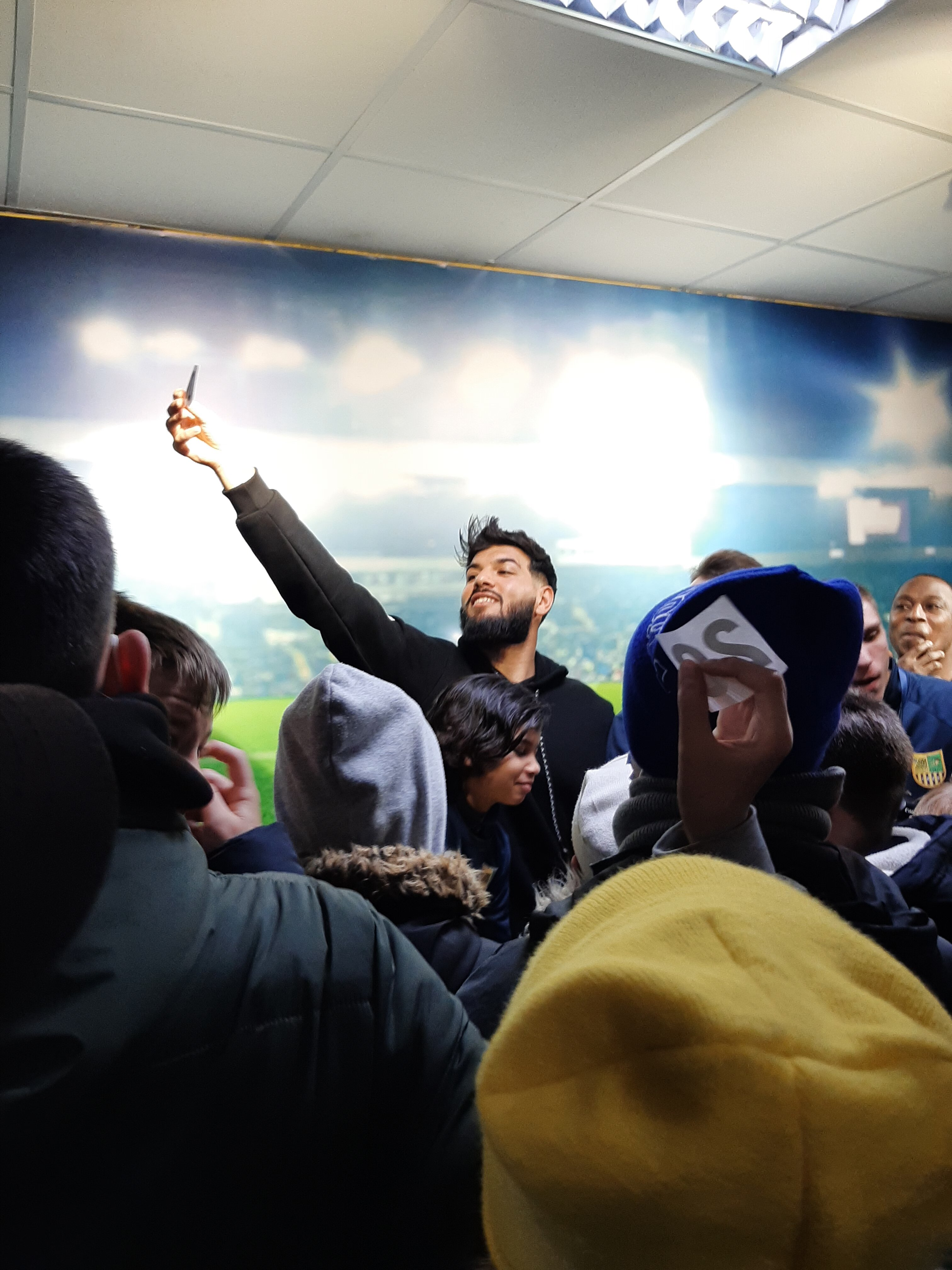
- Bahlouli with Metalist Kharkiv fans

Personal information
- Date of birth: 8 April 1995 (age 31)
- Place of birth: Lyon, France
- Height: 1.81 m (5 ft 11 in)
- Positions: Attacking midfielder; winger

Team information
- Current team: US Biskra
- Number: 7

Youth career
- 2002–2003: ECS Lyon 8
- 2003–2004: FC Lyon
- 2004–2013: Lyon

Senior career*
Years	Team	Apps	(Gls)
2012–2015	Lyon B	38	(6)
2013–2015	Lyon	9	(0)
2015–2017	Monaco	8	(1)
2015	Monaco B	5	(1)
2016–2017	→ Standard Liège (loan)	0	(0)
2017–2019	Lille	14	(1)
2017–2019	Lille B	14	(3)
2020	Lyon Duchère	0	(0)
2020	Lyon Duchère B	1	(0)
2021–2022	Metalist Kharkiv	25	(13)
2022–2023	Dnipro-1	5	(0)
2026–	US Biskra	0	(0)

International career^{‡}
2011	France U16	2	(0)
2012–2013	France U18	5	(2)
2015	France U20	4	(1)
2013	France U21	2	(0)
- * Club domestic league appearances and goals as of 2 August 2026 ‡ National team caps and goals as of 2 September 2022

Farès Bahlouli (born 8 April 1995) is a French professional footballer who plays as an attacking midfielder or winger for Algerian Ligue Professionnelle 1 club US Biskra. He is a former France youth international.

== Club career ==
=== Lyon ===
Bahlouli started his career at Lyon, graduating through the academy before featuring for Lyon B in 2012. He made his debut for Lyon on 12 May 2013 against Paris Saint-Germain.

=== Monaco ===
On 30 June 2015, Bahlouli joined Monaco from Lyon for €3.5 million (plus incentives). Bahlouli scored his first goal for Monaco in a 10–2 win over JS St Jean Beaulieu in the 2015–16 Coupe de France.

==== Standard Liège loan ====
On 31 August 2016, he joined Belgian club Standard Liège on a season-long loan deal. However, he failed to make a single appearance for the senior side.

=== Lille ===
On 1 January 2017, Lille OSC and Monaco reached an agreement for the transfer of Bahlouli. He made his debut for Lille against Angers on 11 February 2017 in a 2–1 defeat. He played five games for the club during the course of the second half of the season in all competitions.

During the 2017–18 season, he featured regularly at the start of the season under new head coach Marcelo Bielsa. He scored his first goal on 5 November 2017 in a 3–0 win against Metz, however, was seldom used under new manager Christophe Galtier, in total he played 15 games in all competitions scoring one goal.

=== Lyon Duchère ===
After terminating his contract with Lille at the end of 2019, Bahlouli signed with Championnat National club Sporting Club Lyon, also known as Lyon Duchère, for six months. However, he never got his debut for the club's first team, only playing one game for the second team in the Championnat National 3, and for that reason, he left the club at the end of his contract.

=== US Biskra ===
On 2 August 2026, he joined Algerian club US Biskra after 3 years of break.

== International career ==
Bahlouli has represented France at several age levels up until France U21's. He has also won the 2015 Toulon Tournament with France U20's playing alongside Monaco teammate Thomas Lemar. He is eligible for the Algeria national side.

== Personal life ==
Bahlouli is the eldest of 4 children in his family. He has two brothers and a sister, all of whom play football and formed at Olympique Lyonnais youth academy. His brother Mohamed is also a professional footballer who currently plays for Lithuanian club FK Kauno Žalgiris, while his other brother Djibrail remains playing in Lyon youth team. His sister, Nesrine, is playing for women Serie A side AC Milan.

== Honours ==
France U20

- Toulon Tournament: 2015
