= Samy Benchamma =

French footballer (born 2000)

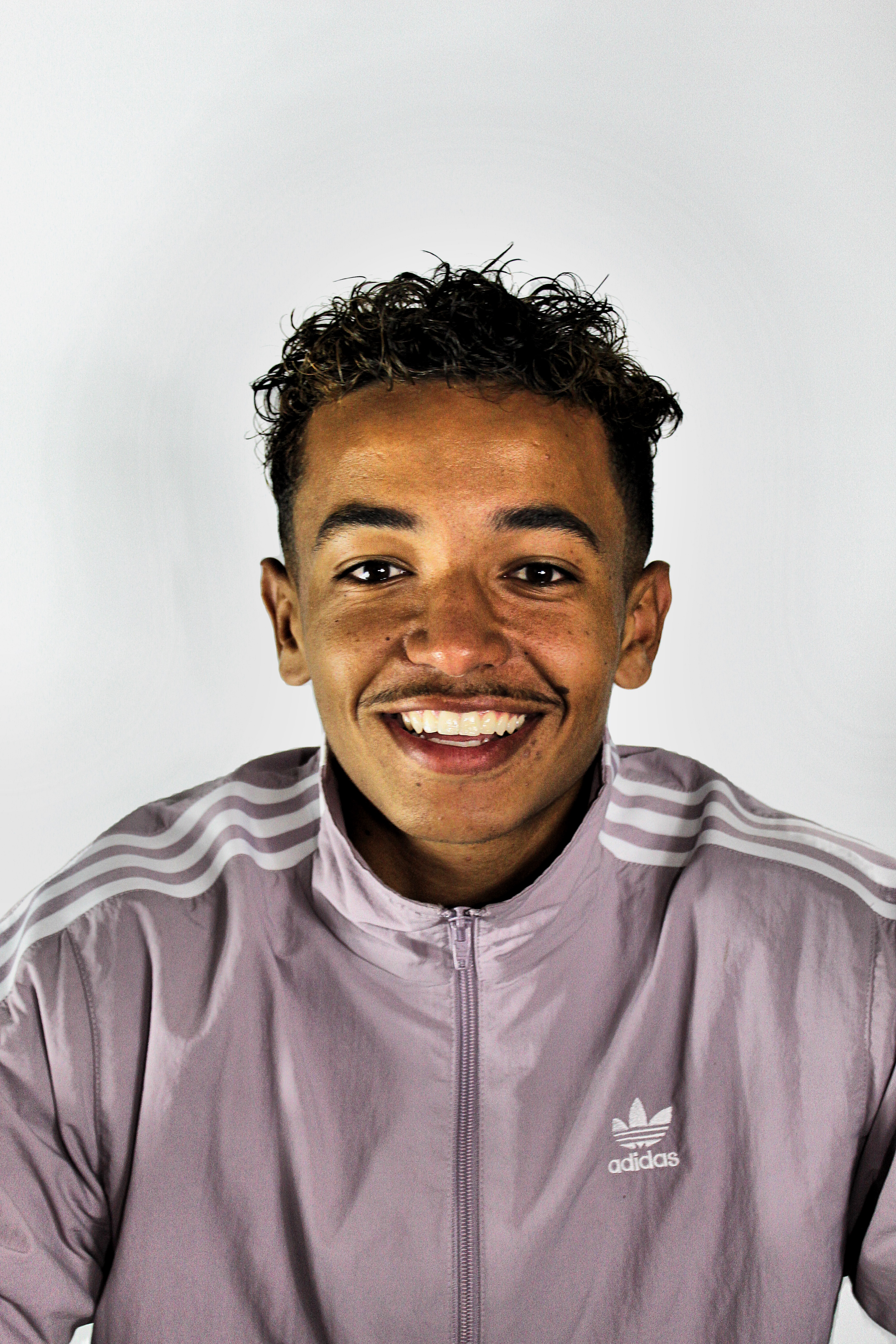
- Benchamma in 2020

Personal information
- Date of birth: 25 June 2000 (age 26)
- Place of birth: Castres, France
- Height: 1.87 m (6 ft 2 in)
- Position: Defensive midfielder

Team information
- Current team: JS Kabylie
- Number: 25

Youth career
- 2004–2010: AS Payrin-Rigautou
- 2010–2013: FC Pays Mazametain
- 2013–2015: US Castres
- 2015–2019: Montpellier

Senior career*
Years	Team	Apps	(Gls)
2019–2020	Montpellier B	26	(2)
2020–2021	Montpellier	5	(0)
2021–2024	Niort	95	(5)
2024–2025	Sochaux	29	(3)
2025–2026	Rodez	32	(4)
2026–	JS Kabylie	9	(1)
- * Club domestic league appearances and goals as of 21:10, 19 November 2026 (UTC)

Samy Benchamma (Arabic: سامي بن شمَّة; Tamazight: ⵙⴰⵎⵢ ⴱⴻⵏⵙⵀⴰⵎⴰ; born 25 June 2000) is a French-Algerian professional footballer who plays as a defensive midfielder for JS Kabylie.

== Career ==
Samy Benchamma first classed at the AS Payrin Rigautou Club, then at FC Pays Mazamétain before joining Castres Football, where he was spotted by the recruits of Montpellier.

Coming from the Montpellier academy, Benchamma signed his first contract with the club in May 2020.

He made his professional debut for Montpellier in a 2–1 Ligue 1 loss to Rennes on 29 August 2020.

On 18 June 2021 it was announced that Benchamma had signed for Niort. On 20 June 2024, he signed for Sochaux on a two-year contract with an option for a third year.

On 1 September 2025, Benchamma moved to Rodez in Ligue 2 and signed a three-season contract.

On 31 August 2026, he joined JS Kabylie, signing a three-year contract with the Kabyle club.

== Personal life ==
Born in France, Benchamma is of Algerian descent.
