= Abdelkader Morcely =

Algerian footballer (born 1995)

Personal information
- Full name: Abdelkader Morcely
- Date of birth: September 17, 1995 (age 31)
- Place of birth: Sidi Bel Abbès, Algeria
- Height: 1.88 m (6 ft 2 in)
- Position: Goalkeeper

Team information
- Current team: CR Témouchent
- Number: 16

Senior career*
Years	Team	Apps	(Gls)
2016–2017	FCB Frenda		(0)
2017–2018	O Médéa	18	(0)
2018–2019	MC Alger	3	(0)
2019–2021	USM Bel Abbès	26	(0)
2021–2022	MC El Eulma		(0)
2022–2023	HB Chelghoum Laïd	7	(0)
2023–2024	MC El Bayadh	32	(0)
2024–2025	Paradou AC	5	(0)
2025	JS Saoura	1	(0)
2025–2026	USM Khenchela	6	(0)
2026–	CR Témouchent	0	(0)
- * Club domestic league appearances and goals as of 5 June 2026

Abdelkader Morcely (Arabic: عبد القادر مرسلي; born September 17, 1995) is an Algerian footballer who plays as a goalkeeper for CR Témouchent.

== Career ==
In 2017–18 season, he played for Olympique de Médéa. In June 2018, he joined MC Alger. In July 2019, he signed for USM Bel Abbès. In August 2022, he joined HB Chelghoum Laïd. In February 2023, he signed for MC El Bayadh. In July 2024, he joined Paradou AC. In January 2025, he signed for MC El Bayadh. In July 2025, he joined USM Khenchela. On 9 July 2026, he joined CR Témouchent.
