= Bouhafs Chabi Stadium =

Football stadium in Zeribet El Oued, Algeria

- Interactive map of Bouhafs Chabi Stadium
- Location: Zeribet El Oued, Algeria
- Coordinates: 34.683°N 6.511°E
- Owner: APC of Zeribet El Oued
- Capacity: 5,400
- Surface: Artificial turf

Tenants
- ES Zeribet El Oued; M Zeribet El Oued; US Biskra (temporary)

Bouhafs Chabi Stadium (Arabic: ملعب بوحفص شابي) is a football stadium in Zeribet El Oued, Algeria. The stadium holds 5,400 people. It serves as the home ground for ES Zeribet El Oued and M Zeribet El Oued.

It serves currently as the home ground for US Biskra after the closure of 18 February Stadium for renovation.

On 16 August 2026, the stadium was officially approved by LFP Stadiums Committee to host matches.
