= Omar Oucief Stadium =

Multi-purpose stadium in Aïn Témouchent, Algeria

Coordinates: 35.2895°N 1.1410°W

- Siki
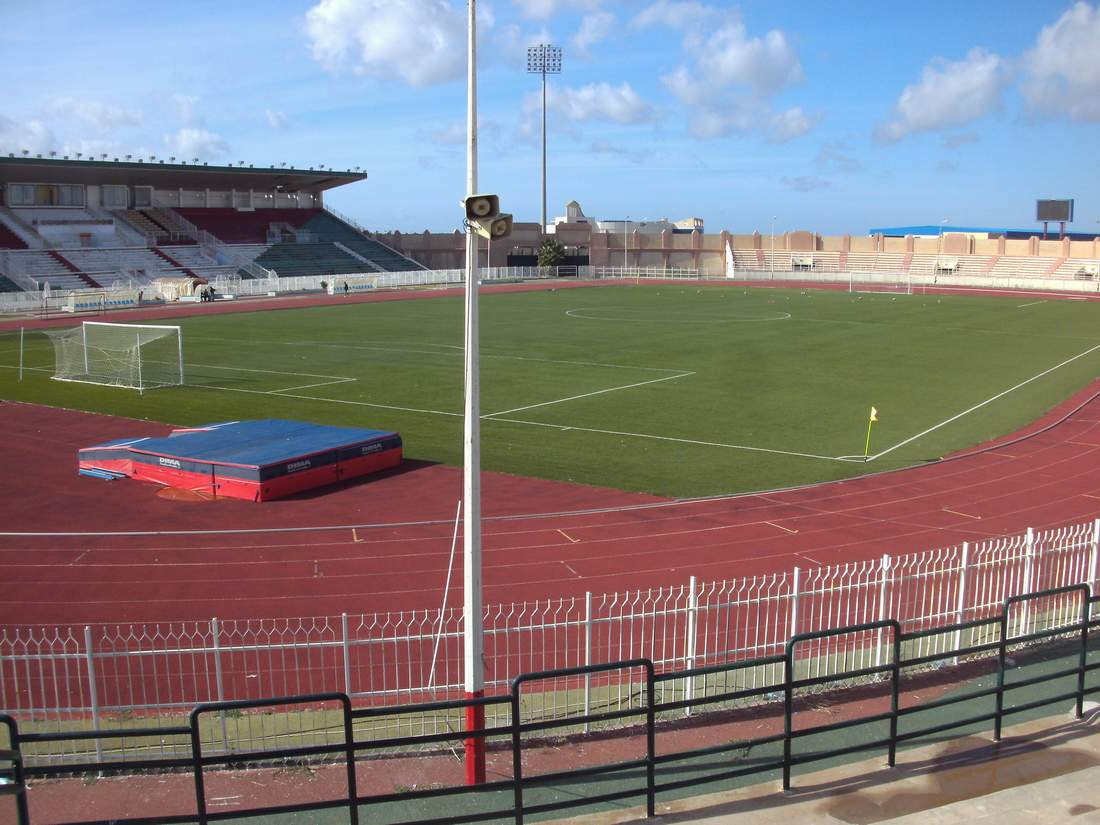
- Interactive map of Omar Oucief Stadium
- Full name: Stade Omar-Oucief
- Location: Aïn Témouchent, Algeria
- Owner: APC of Aïn Témouchent
- Capacity: 11,500
- Surface: Grass

Construction
- Opened: 1 July 2009

Tenant
- CR Témouchent

Omar Oucief Stadium (Arabic: ملعب عمر اوسياف), is a multi-purpose stadium in Aïn Témouchent, Algeria. It is currently used mostly for football matches. The stadium has a capacity of 11,500 people.

The stadium was used as one of the venues for the 2013 African U-20 Championship.
