= Zeribet El Oued =

City in Biskra Province, Algeria

Coordinates: 34°41′N 6°31′E

Zeribet El Oued is a city in Biskra Province, Algeria. In 2007, its population was recorded as 25.613. It is located at 80 km east of Biskra at the foot of the Aurès mountains.

Zeribet El Oued name meant "the barrier of valley." The Valley which is named "Arab valley" "wadi alarab".
