= CR Témouchent =

Algerian football club

- Full name: Chabab Riadhi Témouchent
- Nicknames: CRT; El Chabab; El Hamra
- Founded: May 17, 1961; 65 years ago
- Ground: Omar Oucief Stadium
- Capacity: 11,500
- Chairman: Houari Talbi
- Manager: Moustapha Djallit
- League: Ligue 1
- 2025–26: League 2, Gr. Centre-west, 3rd of 16 (promoted via play-offs)
Home colours	Away colours

Chabab Riadhi Témouchent (Arabic: شباب رياضي تموشنت), known as CR Témouchent or simply CRT for short, is an Algerian football club based in Aïn Témouchent. The club was founded in 1961 and its colours are red and white. Their home stadium, Omar Oucief Stadium, has a capacity of 11,500 spectators. The club is currently playing in the Algerian Ligue Professionnelle 1.

== History ==
On May 17, 1961, a group made up of Mohradj Hadj Belghaba, Mohamed Attou, Bénamar Hadj Gourine, Zénagui Hadj Yekhled, Boumediène "Diden" Bouri, Saïd Tagri, Salem Yahiaoui, Ahmed Lalaoui, Ahmed Mahdaoui, Sid Ahmed Abden founded the club in an Aïn Témouchent cafe owned by former boxer and North African champion Ahmed Hadjouti. The first president of Chabab Riadhi Témouchent was Mohamed "Houmani" Hadjeri. After the independence of Algeria, Mankour Hadj Bensahih, known as Petit Mankour, took over as the president of the club. On August 5, 2020, CR Témouchent were promoted to the Algerian Ligue 2.

During the 2025–26 season,CR Témouchent achieved historic success by securing promotion to the Algerian Ligue 1 Mobilis for the first time in the club's 65-year history. Competing in the Ligue 2 Center-West division under head coach Driss Bentayeb, the team finished the regular season in third place with 59 points, recording 17 victories, 8 draws, and 5 defeats. The team's campaign was defined by defensive resilience, conceding 23 goals while scoring 38 across 30 group stage matches. A strong string of low-scoring victories in April and May allowed the club to qualify for the promotion playoffs.In the playoff semifinal, CR Témouchent advanced past CA Batna by winning a penalty shootout 4–2 following a 1–1 draw in regulation time. On May 20, 2026, the club faced US Chaouia in the promotion playoff final at the neutral Stade Hocine Aït Ahmed in Tizi-Ouzou. A 77th-minute goal by Ahmed Ghennam secured a 1–0 victory, officially confirming the club's historic elevation to the top flight of Algerian football alongside fellow promoted sides JS El Biar and US Biskra.

== Players ==
Algerian teams are limited to four foreign players. The squad list includes only the principal nationality of each player;

=== Current squad ===
As of 31 August 2026 Note: Flags indicate national team as defined under FIFA eligibility rules; some limited exceptions apply. Players may hold more than one non-FIFA nationality.

No.	Pos.	Nation	Player
1	GK	ALG	Faris Boukerrit
2	DF	ALG	Mohamed Ali Larbi
3	DF	ALG	Wael Guerroudja
4	DF	ALG	Islam Chahrour (captain)
5	DF	ALG	Safieddine Atmania (on loan from USM Alger)
6	MF	ALG	Seddik Senhadji
7	FW	ALG	Billel Bensaha
8	MF	ALG	Abderrahmane Berkoun
9	FW	EGY	Mohamed Zaalouk
10	FW	ALG	Boumediene Freifer
11	FW	ALG	Mehdi Hedroug (on loan from MC Alger)
12	MF	ALG	Redouane Bounoua
13	FW	ALG	Naoufel Merdja
14	DF	ALG	Boubakar Baouche
15	MF	ALG	Khathir Baaziz

No.	Pos.	Nation	Player
16	GK	ALG	Abdelkader Morcely
17	MF	ALG	El Kacem Khodja
18	MF	ALG	Mohamed Zane
19	FW	ALG	Abdelillah Barkat
20	FW	ALG	Nazim Itim
21	DF	ALG	Abdellah Meddah
22	MF	ALG	Sid Ahmed Aissaoui
23	DF	ALG	Abdelhak Belkacemi
24	MF	EGY	Seif Safaga (on loan from ENPPI SC)
25	DF	ALG	Hamad Boutamina
26	MF	ALG	Imed Saihi
27	FW	ALG	Mohamed Toumi Sief
28	DF	ALG	Lahcene Bouziane
29	MF	ALG	Abdelkrim Hamri
30	GK	ALG	Amine Saou

== Personnel ==
=== Current technical staff ===
Position	Staff
Head coach	(Algeria) Moustapha Djallit
Assistant coach	(Algeria) Adel Mansouri
Goalkeeping coach	(Algeria) Hocine Belalem
Fitness coach	(Algeria) Khadir Saadi

== Achievements ==
- Algerian League 2
  Play-off Winner (1) : 2025-26
  Runner-up (2) : 2021, 2022
- Interregional League
  Winner (5): 1971, 1974, 2009, 2012, 2020
  Runner-up (1) : 2000
- Régional I
  Winner (2): 2008, 2019
