= Swope Park =

Park in Missouri, U.S.

- Interactive map of Swope Park
- Type: Urban park
- Location: Kansas City, Missouri, United States
- Coordinates: 39°00′28″N 94°32′05″W
- Area: 1,805 acres (7.30 km^{2}; 2.82 mi^{2})
- Created: 1896; 130 years ago
- Founder: Thomas H. Swope
- Designer: George E. Kessler
- Owner: City of Kansas City, Missouri
- Website: kcparks.org

Swope Park is the largest municipal park in Kansas City, Missouri, and is considered the "crown jewel" of the city's historic Parks and Boulevards system. Swope is more than twice the size of Central Park in New York City, and one of the largest urban parks in the United States at 1,805 acres (7.30 km^{2}; 2.820 mi^{2}).

It was established in 1896 through a single land donation from controversial real estate magnate Thomas H. Swope, late in his life and surprisingly contradicting his long protest against the city's new public park and boulevard system. Kansas City's master landscape architect George E. Kessler integrated formal elements with the natural terrain of the Blue River valley. The park's history is complex, including civic pride, racism, and social conflict. Access to Swope's racially segregated facilities was a central focus of protest within Kansas City's massive long-term civil rights struggle.

Its vast borders contain many of Kansas City's primary cultural institutions, including the Kansas City Zoo & Aquarium, Starlight Theatre, the Swope Soccer Village in partnership with Sporting Kansas City, the Swope Memorial Golf Course, and the Lakeside Nature Center which is one of the largest of its kind in Missouri. Significant revitalization efforts are restoring the park's historic features and improving its connection to the surrounding communities.

== Geography ==
Swope Park's landscape is characterized by rolling uplands, deep ravines, and the valley of the Blue River. Most of the park remains vast and heavy woodland, preserving its natural character. The terrain is marked by limestone bluffs of Bethany Falls Limestone, which are prominent along the park's trail system. The park's ecology is a diversity of habitats, including upland and lowland forests, riparian forests, and remnants of native tallgrass prairie. The Blue River is the dominant natural feature of Swope Park, flowing northward through its center. The park's boundaries include the area of the Battle of Byram's Ford, a key engagement in the American Civil War's Battle of Westport.

== Attractions ==
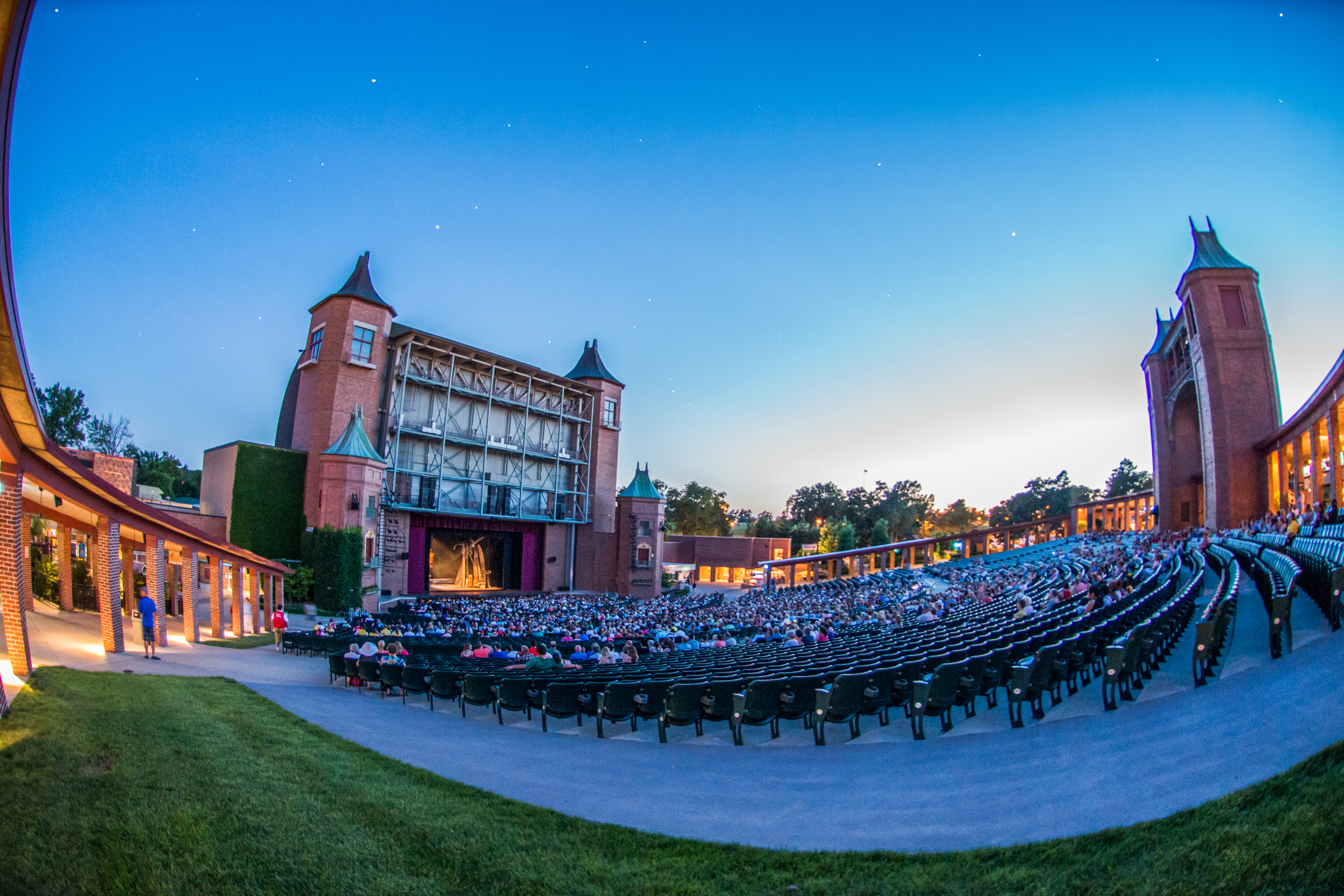
Starlight Theatre

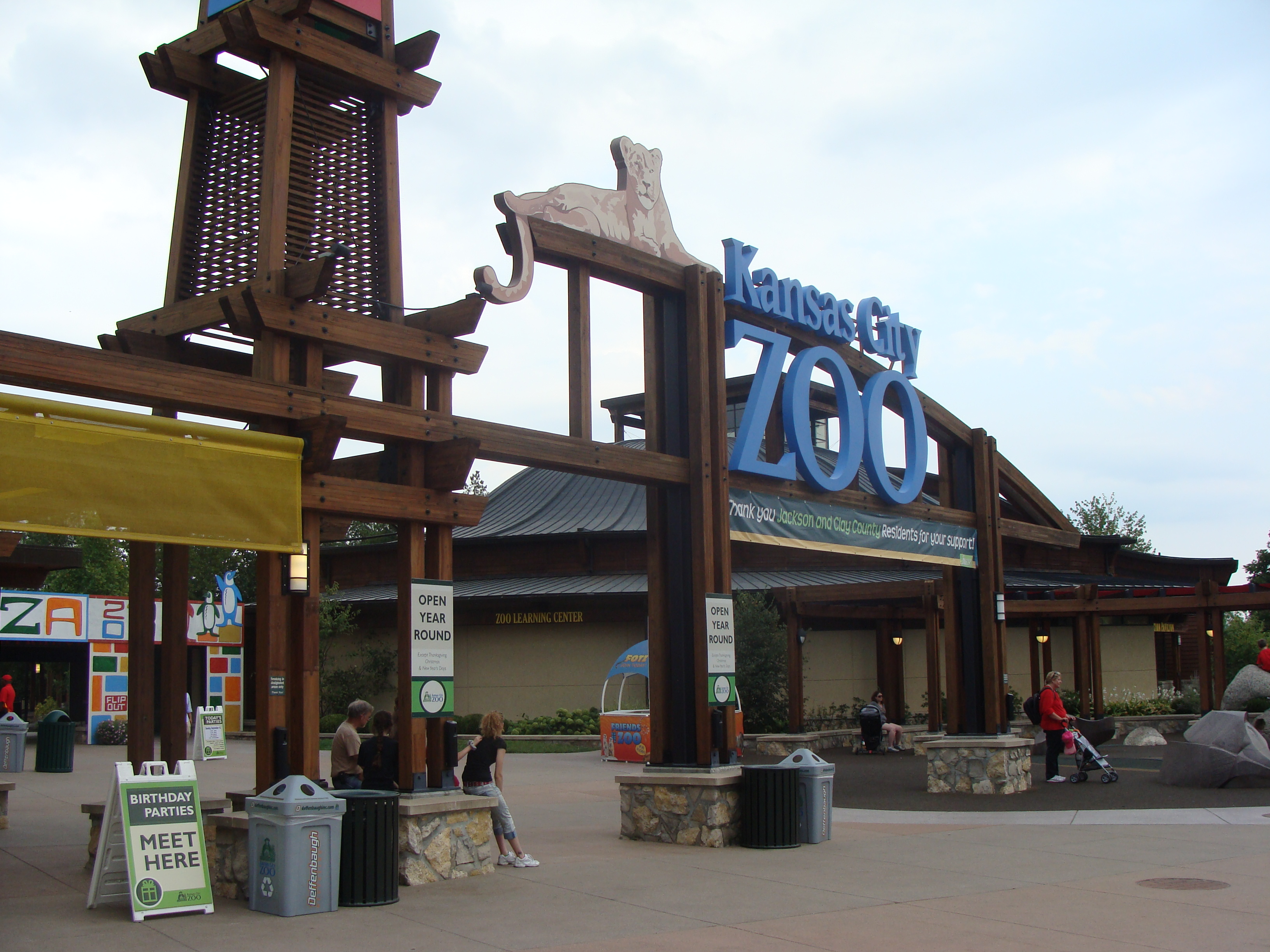
Kansas City Zoo & Aquarium

The Kansas City Zoo & Aquarium opened in 1909 and has grown to 202 acres (82 ha). A major expansion in the 1990s created large, naturalistic exhibits for Australia and Africa. Other additions include the Helzberg Penguin Plaza (2013) and the Sobela Ocean Aquarium (2023).

Starlight Theatre is a 8,000-seat outdoor theater opened in 1950. It is one of only two remaining self-producing outdoor theaters in the United States. Since 1951, it has presented Broadway musicals and hosted numerous concerts.

Swope Memorial Golf Course was redesigned in 1934 by renowned golf course architect A. W. Tillinghast, as the first public golf course in Kansas City. After years of neglect, the course is undergoing a comprehensive renovation to restore Tillinghast's original design, with a scheduled reopening in 2026.

Swope Soccer Village is a state-of-the-art athletic complex developed in partnership with Sporting Kansas City of Major League Soccer. The facility features nine soccer fields and a 3,557-seat stadium.

Lakeside Nature Center was opened in 1966 as a hub for environmental education and wildlife rehabilitation. It is one of Missouri's largest wildlife rehabilitation facilities.

The Battle of Westport Museum & Visitor Center is located in the historic Shelter No. 1 building. It preserves the history of the Battle of Westport, the largest Civil War battle west of the Mississippi River.

Thomas H. Swope Memorial is the mausoleum of the park's donor. It is a grand, Greek Doric-style monument located on one of the park's highest points. It was designed by George Kessler and completed in 1918, featuring a U-shaped colonnade and sculpted lions by Charles Keck.

== History ==
=== Donation and design ===
The creation of Swope Park was a defining event in late 19th-century Kansas City, resulting from the convergence of the nationwide City Beautiful movement and the ambitions of Thomas H. Swope (1827–1909). He was a Kentucky native and Yale graduate, who became the largest individual landowner in Kansas City through extensive, shrewd, and often resented real estate investments. For years, he was a vocal opponent of the city's park and boulevard plan, designed by George E. Kessler, which he publicly decried as a tax scheme.

In a reversal that stunned the city, the nearly 70-year-old Swope donated 1,334 acres (540 ha) to the city in 1896 for the creation of a public park. The land was undeveloped and located nearly 7 miles (11 km) from the city's southern limits. The donation was celebrated with a Swope Park Jubilee on June 25, 1896, which was declared a civic holiday and attended by 18,000 people. The gift relieved him of a significant tax liability and transformed his public image from an obstructionist to a celebrated philanthropist. His conditional requirement to be buried in the park led to the construction of the Thomas H. Swope Memorial, a grand mausoleum on one of the highest elevation points.

Suddenly on October 3, 1909, Swope's life ended in controversy, just weeks after the suspicious death of his farm manager. His nephew-in-law, Dr. Bennett Clark Hyde, was accused of poisoning both men with cyanide-laced typhoid medication in a scheme to hasten his wife's inheritance. The legal trial was a national sensation. Hyde was convicted of murder, but the verdict was overturned on appeal. After two mistrials, the charges were dropped in 1917, leaving the case officially unsolved. Due to the prolonged legal battle, Swope's body lay in a holding vault for nearly nine years before being interred in his memorial in 1918.

Kessler, whose master plan Swope had once opposed, was tasked with designing the park. In his 1898 plan, Kessler embraced its naturalism, preserving the "wild and rugged" character of the terrain and creating a pastoral experience for visitors.

=== Early development ===
Major construction projects were completed between 1905 and 1912. The Grand Entrance at Swope Parkway and Meyer Boulevard was finished in 1905, featuring the native stone Shelter No. 1. The park's two large man-made lakes, the 9 acres (3.6 ha) Lake of the Woods and the 25.5 acres (10.3 ha) Lagoon, were completed by 1909. The Lagoon quickly became a popular destination with boat rentals and a public bathing beach. The first permanent building for the Kansas City Zoo & Aquarium, the "Bird and Carnivora House", was dedicated in 1909. By 1910, the park was a bustling "people's playground", attracting over 580,000 visitors that year. In 1915, a 200 feet (61 m) flagpole, then considered the tallest in the country, was dedicated near the main shelter house.

=== Segregation and civil rights ===
For decades, Swope Park was governed by the discriminatory practices of the Jim Crow era. African Americans were permitted to use the park grounds, but were barred from its most desirable facilities. The main swimming pool, a large WPA-funded project completed in 1941, was designated for "whites-only" from its opening. African American residents were relegated to the much smaller and inferior Parade Park Pool. Similarly, the premier 18-hole Swope Memorial Golf Course, which had been redesigned by A. W. Tillinghast in 1934, was restricted to white players, but Black golfers were allowed to play on the smaller nine-hole course only on Mondays. Of the eight picnic shelters, only Shelter #5 was designated for use by African Americans. The area around it became nicknamed "Watermelon Hill", after a racist stereotype that was a source of division within the Black community. Some found the name offensive, and others embraced the space as a vibrant hub for social gatherings, creating what historian Brad Manly called "a site of Black cultural solidarity in the face of this oppressive system".

In 1949, the course hosted the Kansas City Open Invitational of the PGA Tour.

These segregated facilities became the focus of organized resistance. On June 20, 1951, a group of Black residents, with the support of the NAACP, attempted to purchase tickets to the main swimming pool. After being denied entry, they filed a lawsuit with a legal team that included Thurgood Marshall. In defiance of a federal court order to integrate, the city's parks board closed the pool for two full seasons. It was reopened on an integrated basis only after another court order in June 1954. A similar protest occurred on March 24, 1950, when four Black golfers—Reuben Benton, George Johnson, Leroy Doty, and Sylvester "Pat" Johnson—played a full round at the "white-only" course. Their police escort off the course helped spark the desegregation of the city's golf facilities. The still-segregated course hosted the 1953 United Golf Association (UGA) National Championship, a tournament for Black golfers barred from the PGA. The men's division event was won by Charlie Sifford, who later broke the PGA's color barrier. The women's division was won by Ann Gregory.

=== Modern ===
After World War II, new major attractions were developed. Starlight Theatre is a nearly 8,000-seat outdoor venue, which opened in 1950 and hosted Broadway musicals since the following year. The Lakeside Nature Center was established in 1966, providing wildlife rehabilitation and environmental education. In 2007, Swope Soccer Village was first dedicated in partnership with Sporting Kansas City, establishing a modern athletic complex.

With all city acquisitions of adjacent land over the 20th century, Swope Park totals 1,805 acres (730 ha).

== See also ==
- National Register of Historic Places listings in Kansas City, Missouri
- Kessler Park and Loose Park, the second and third largest parks in Kansas City
