= Starlight Theatre (Kansas City, Missouri) =

Theater in Kansas City, Missouri, United States

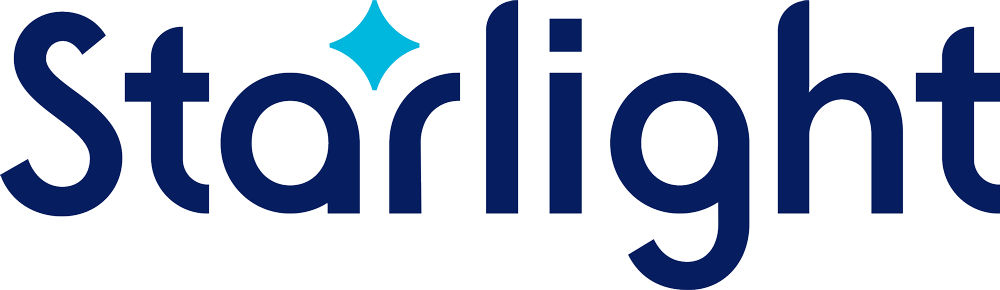

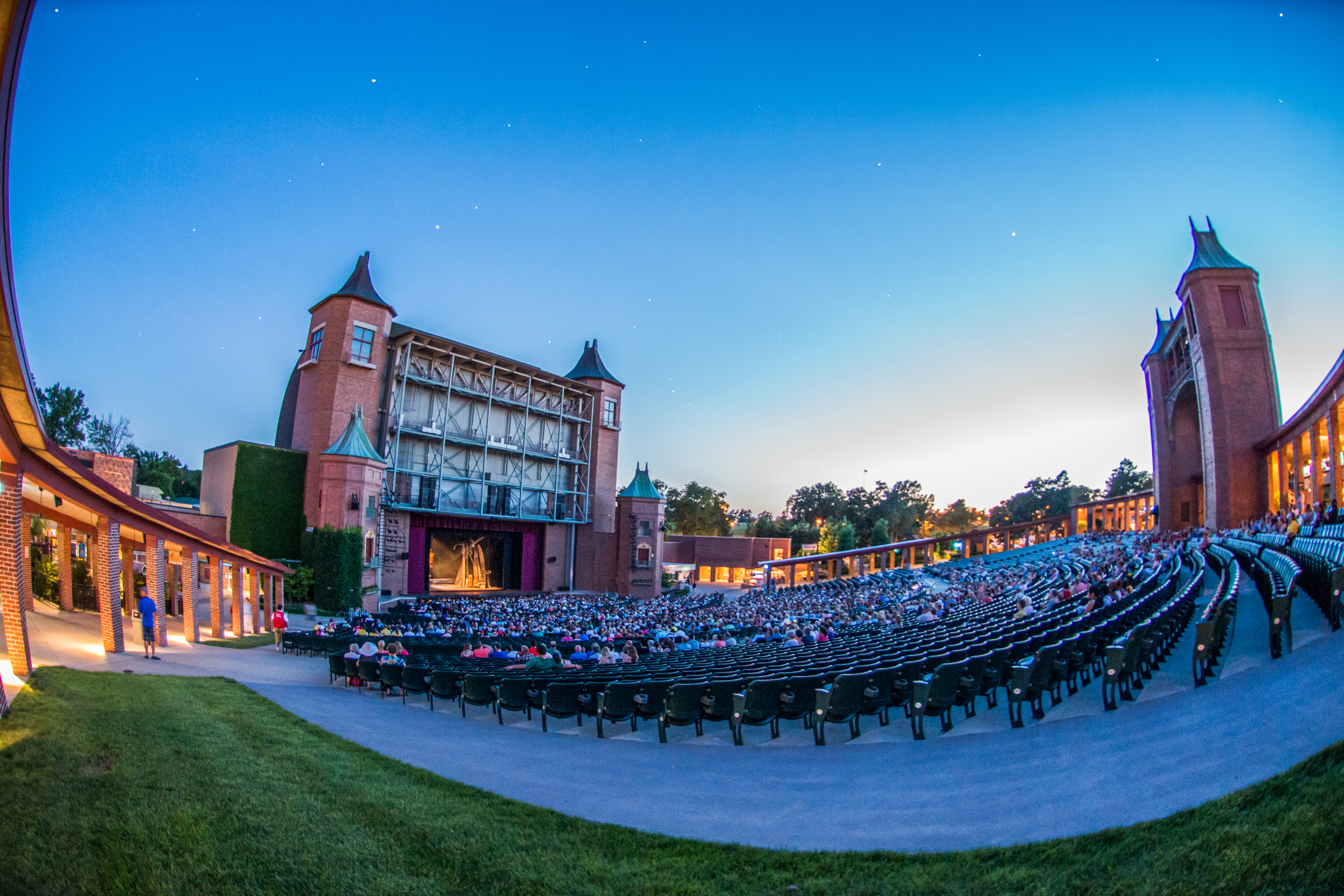
- Interactive map of Starlight Theatre
- Location: 4600 Starlight Road; Kansas City, Missouri 64132
- Coordinates: 39.007813°N 94.5348°W
- Owner: City of Kansas City, Missouri
- Operator: Starlight Theatre Association; Live Nation (concert booking)
- Capacity: Starlight: 7,739; Cohen: 1,200

Construction
- Groundbreaking: 1925
- Opened: June 3, 1950
- Cost: $1.5 million
- Architect: Edward Buehler Delk

Tenants
- Broadway Shows; Concerts; Starlight Indoors; Community Engagement Programming

Website
- www.kcstarlight.com

Starlight Theatre is a 7,739-seat outdoor theater in Kansas City, Missouri, United States that presents Broadway shows and concerts. It is one of the two major remaining self-producing outdoor theatres in the U.S. and Starlight's Cohen stagehouse also permits it to present many national Broadway touring shows.

== History ==
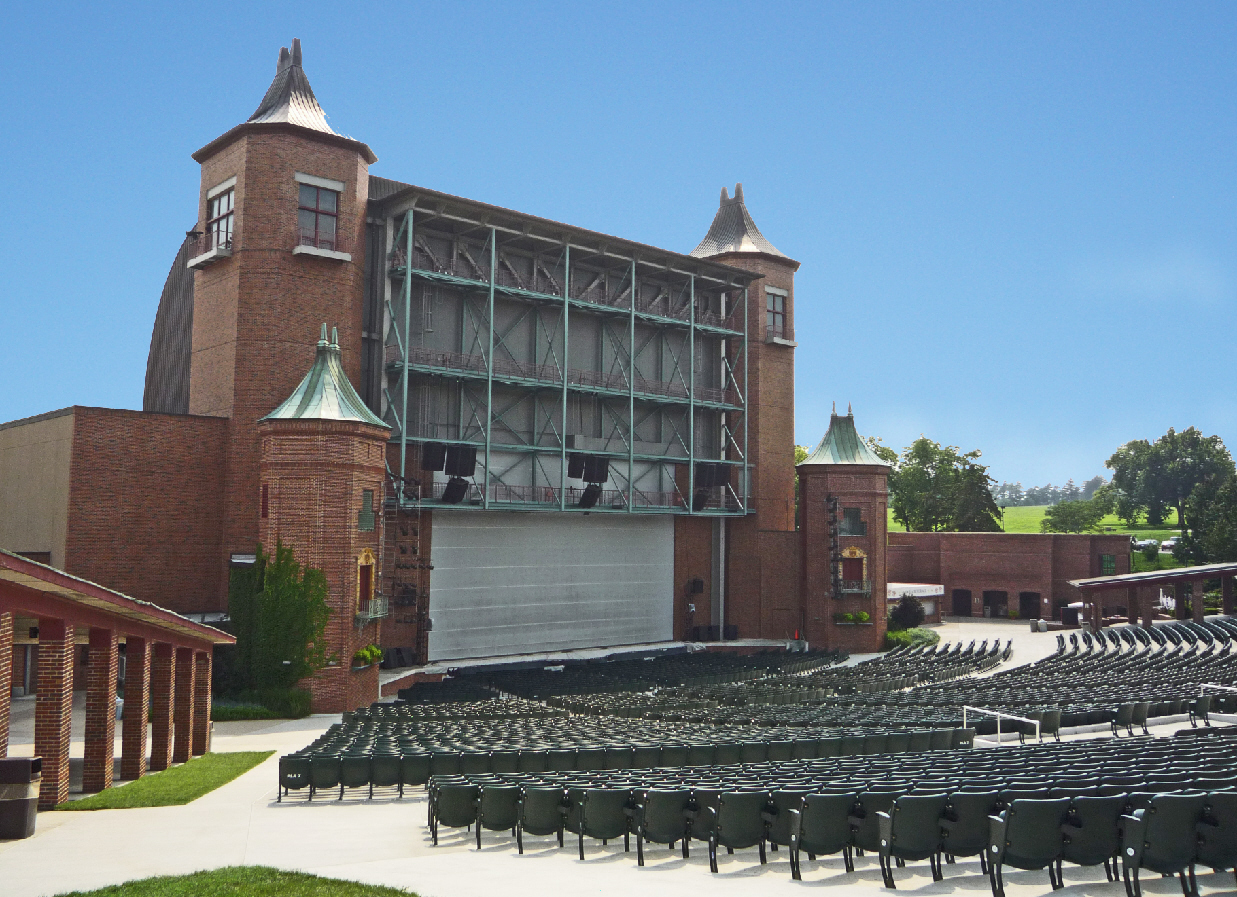
Starlight Theatre stage

Starlight Theatre's history starts in 1925, the year Romania’s Queen Marie paid a visit to Kansas City. To celebrate her arrival, the Kansas City Federation of Music organized a showcase of local talent for the Queen that was also open to the public.

Profits from the showcase were then placed in the city trust and proposals for the location of Kansas City’s outdoor theater began. One suggested site was where Kansas City Art Institute now stands, but area residents disapproved of building such a large structure in their neighborhood. Another possible location was just north of University of Missouri–Kansas City, although these plans were also shelved because officials feared the theater would compete with the newly completed Municipal Auditorium.

After 15 years of proposals, the need for a venue to house celebrations commemorating Kansas City’s 100th birthday sped up the process. A committee was quickly chosen, Swope Park was deemed the location, and construction began in December 1949. On June 3rd, 1950, in a facility not yet fully complete, the historical revue, Thrills of a Century, opened at Starlight Theatre in celebration of Kansas City’s 100th birthday. The show played nightly through July 10. Hundreds of local citizens participated in the pageant, and thousands turned out each night. Show highlights included the staging of the Battle of Westport, and the original locomotive that crossed the Hannibal Bridge 81 years before chugging across the stage on specially built rails.

Following the success of Thrills of a Century, the Starlight Theatre Association of Kansas City, Inc., was formed as a 501(c)(3)nonprofit organization. John A. Moore was elected as the association’s first president, and New York veteran Richard Berger was hired as Starlight’s first producing director, a position he would hold through 1971.

Starlight opened its first Broadway season with the performance of The Desert Song on June 25, 1951.

In 1958, Jerry Lewis paid for a stage extension that covered the orchestra pit. In the early 1980s, the stage was permanently extended over the orchestra pit, bringing on stage action closer to the audience. This extension lasted until the building of the 10-story Jeannette and Jerome Cohen Community Stage in 2000.

During the 1960s production of the musical Mr. President, President Harry S. Truman made a guest appearance in the opening night show. An attack of appendicitis forced Truman to leave Starlight by ambulance during the intermission.

Starlight is one of two self-producing outdoor theaters in the U.S.

The addition of the Jeannette and Jerome Cohen Community Stage in 2000 made it one of the largest roadhouses in the country. Starlight began presenting major national tours in 2000 to bring more recent and contemporary Broadway musicals to Kansas City.

To provide entertainment year-round to current patrons and new audiences, Starlight created a live indoor theater series called Starlight Indoors that premiered in 2015. It features small comedies, musicals, parodies and other unconventional shows, and is presented inside the heated performance space of Starlight’s Cohen Community Stage House.

== Concerts ==
The Starlight was host to a number of concerts. The Grateful Dead played there on three occasions, once in August 1982, again two years later in July 1984, and the final time on September 3, 1985.

== See also ==
- List of contemporary amphitheatres
