= Kansas City Zoo & Aquarium =

Zoo in Kansas City, Missouri, United States

Kansas City Zoo
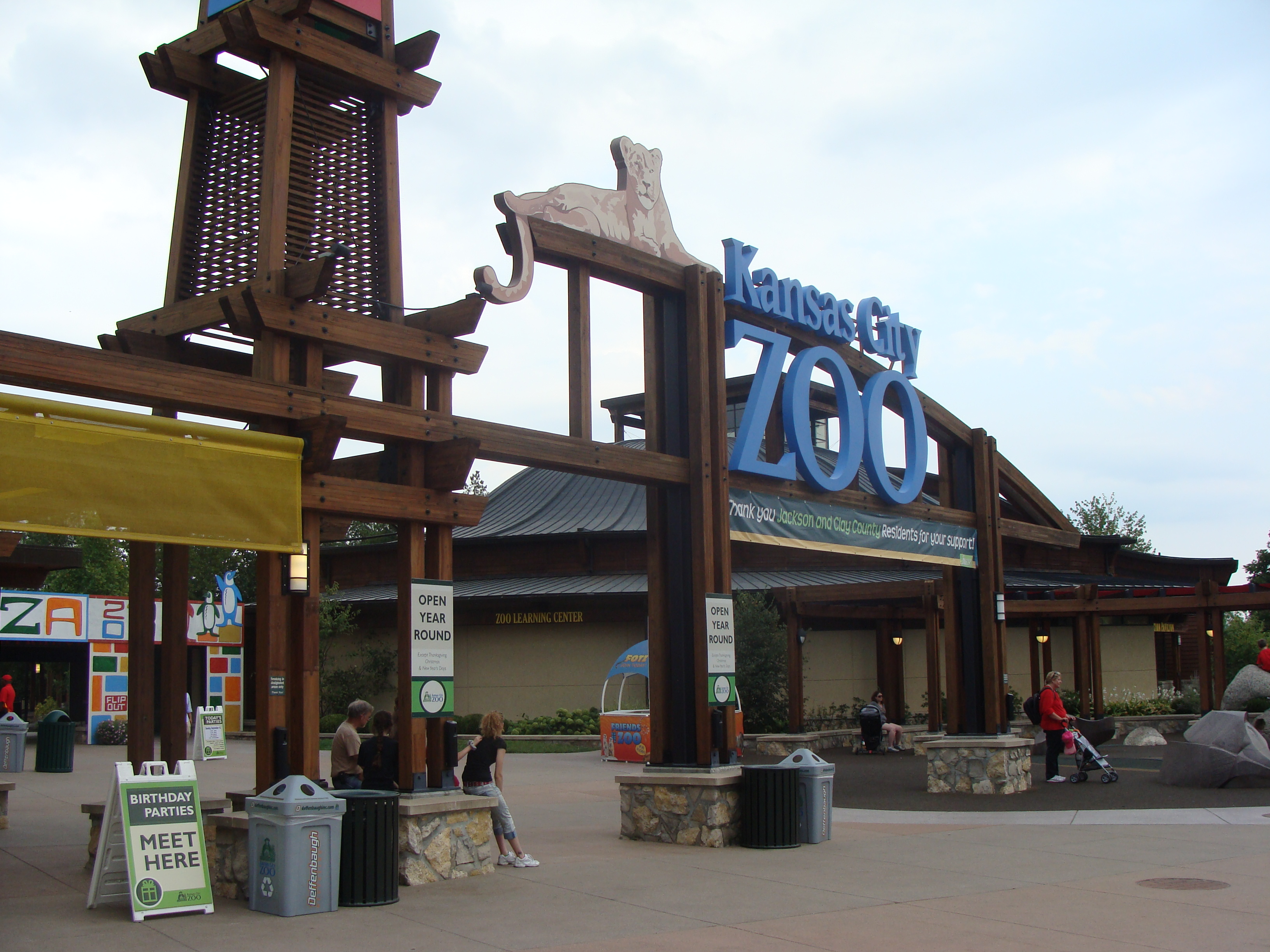
- Interactive map of Kansas City Zoo
- 39°0′25″N 94°31′45″W
- Date opened: December 13, 1909; 116 years ago
- Location: Swope Park; Kansas City, Missouri, United States
- Land area: 202 acres (82 ha)
- No. of animals: 1,700+ (Zoo) and 8,000+ (Aquarium)
- Annual visitors: 1+ million
- Memberships: AZA
- Website: kansascityzoo.org

The Kansas City Zoo & Aquarium is a 202-acre (82 ha) zoo founded in 1909 and is located in Swope Park at 6800 Zoo Drive, Kansas City, Missouri, in the United States. The zoo has a Friends of the Zoo program to help promote the work of the zoo which sees over one million visitors a year. The zoo is home to nearly 1,700 animals and the aquarium has around 8,000 animals. The zoo is an accredited member of the Association of Zoos and Aquariums (AZA).

== History ==
Planning for the zoo started in 1907, and its gates opened on December 13, 1909. The zoo evolved slowly during its first 40 years, while it added exhibits such as the Bear Grotto in 1912. It gained more momentum when it added a monkey island and a children's zoo in the 1940s. In the 1950s, the sea lion pool, African Veldt, giraffe house and flamingoes were all added; and the zoo added an otter pool, elephant house, and the Great Ape House in the 1960s. The early 1970s brought a dairy barn, the Great Catwalk and gibbon islands. Approximately twenty years later (in 1991), after voting and finances from a grant, the zoo expanded to the current size of 202 acres (82 ha), adding Australia in 1993, International Festival in 1994, and Africa in 1995. The opening of the Africa section drew in approximately 40,000 visitors in first 2 days.

The zoo would also build a new building to feature the first IMAX in a zoo, the Sprint IMAX Theater. The improvements resulted in record attendance of 700,000 zoo guests and 400,000 IMAX visitors in 1998. The zoo has grown from a small building and 60 acres (24 ha) to a large, 202-acre (82 ha) zoo with over 1,300 animals. The Orangutan Primadome opened in 2002 as a part of new management when the zoo changed from a city-operated organization to a public-private partnership with Friends of the Zoo (FOTZ for short).

A 20-year plan plots the zoo's future, including new improvements. The Discovery Barn opened in 2006 along with a short-cut path to Africa. In 2006, the Kansas City Zoo was selected to become a breeding facility for African elephants and baboons. In 2007, an endangered species carousel was added to KidZone. The Zoo closed the Sprint IMAX Theater on September 4, 2007. New admission gates to the zoo were opened in May 2008 featuring new parking and animals.

Extensive renovations of the zoo began in late 2005. The Discovery Barn opened in 2006, formerly the Red Barn. It contains many exhibits and slides for children. Outside, there is a Peek-a-Boo Tree, that is fun for children to play in and get a sky-high view at the top of the tree, and like the Discovery Barn, it also contains a slide. The Promenade was also added in 2006, which is a wide path straight to the African elephants exhibit, which allows guests to reach Africa much faster. The new entrance admission gates opened in May 2008, with an educational center and a North American river otter and trumpeter swan exhibits. In early 2009, the Tropics House opened behind the Sea Lion pavilion in the 1909 Building and the polar bear exhibit opened in August 2010, located near the entrance, in the location formerly occupied by stroller rental. In October 2013, the Helzberg Penguin Plaza opened, funded by an ongoing series of fundraising events as well as a 1/8th cent sales tax collected from the 2 county Zoological District. In 2023 the $77 million Sobela Ocean Aquarium, which involved over 10 years of planning, opened to the public.

== Exhibits ==
The zoo is 202 acres (82 ha) and is home to more than 1,300 animals. It is located in Swope Park, the 29th largest municipal park in the United States. The zoo is divided into five areas of the following themes: Africa, Australia, Tiger Trail, KidZone and The Valley.

=== Front entry plaza ===
The admission gates and facilities (such as restrooms, gift shop, and food) are located in the entrance to the Kansas City Zoo. In 2010, polar bears were re-introduced to the zoo near the existing North American river otter and trumpeter swan pool just inside the World Gate. The entry plaza also features an educational center and stops for both the zebra tram and train.

==== Polar Bear Passage ====
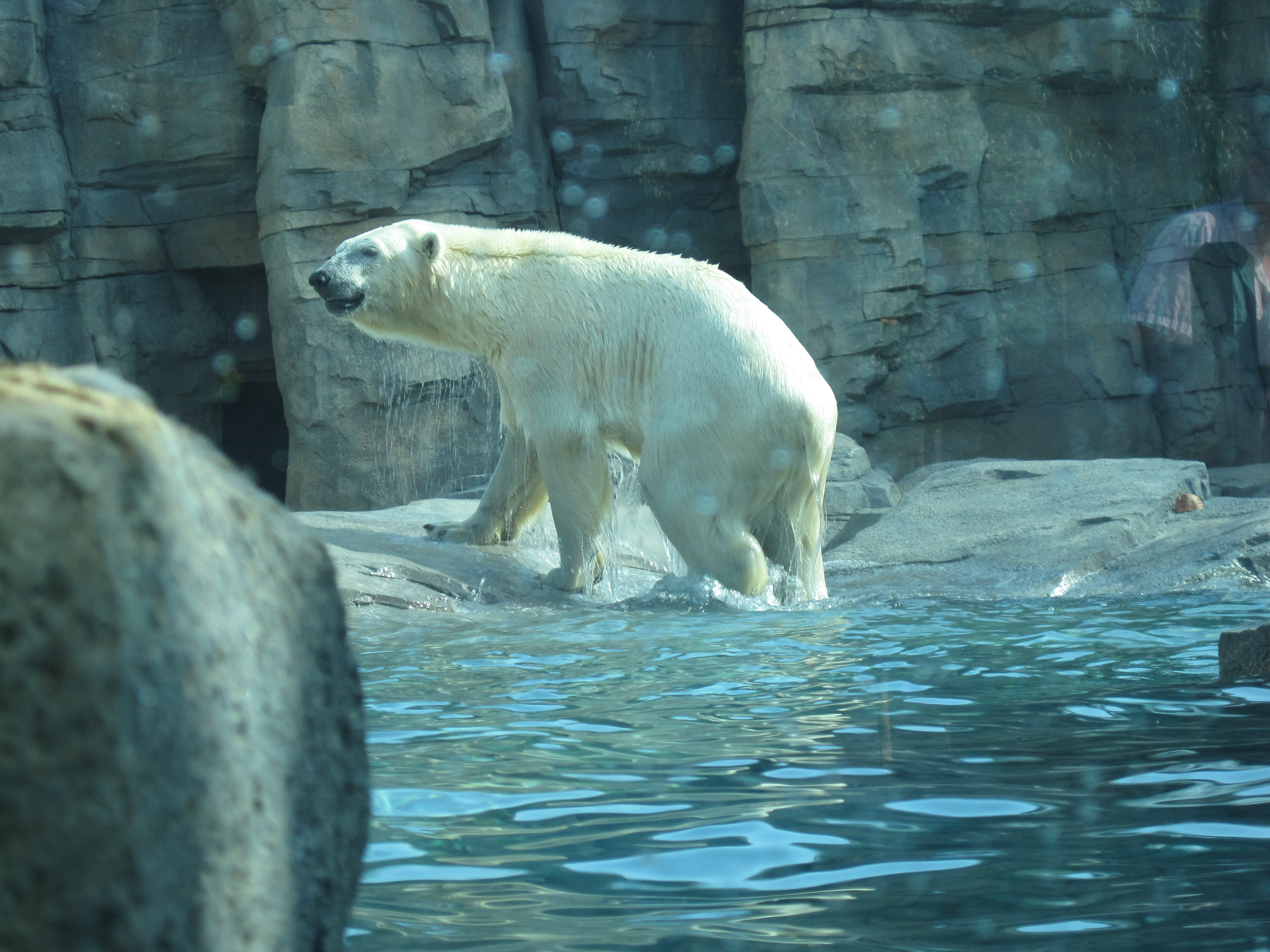
Nikita

This exhibit opened on August 8, 2010, with the introduction of a polar bear named Nikita, who was given to the Kansas City Zoo by the Toledo Zoo. The $11 million exhibit features a 140,000 US gallons (530,000 L) pool serviced by a massive waterfall, multiple indoor and outdoor viewing angles with 2.25-inch-thick (57 mm) glass windows, and space for up to two additional polar bears. In early-2013, a second polar bear was added to the exhibit, a female named Berlin, who was loaned to the zoo from Duluth, Minnesota's Lake Superior Zoo in hopes that the two bears would breed. In late-2015, Nikita was transferred from the zoo to the North Carolina Zoo for breeding purposes. In late-2020, the zoo welcomed a new male polar bear named Nuniq, previously born at Ohio's Columbus Zoo and Aquarium in 2016 and living at the Henry Vilas Zoo in Madison, Wisconsin before transferal.

=== Africa ===
The Africa section is broken up into five subsections: Botswana, Kenya, Tanzania, the Congolese Rainforest, and Uganda. Several snack bars are located throughout Africa, as well as the Rafiki Restaurant and Equator gift shop in the Nanyuki Market (Kenya). Nanyuki Market also has a small aviary for masked lovebirds and a white-cheeked turaco. A zebra tram station and boat house are located in the Nanyuki Market. Tanzania features a pier for the boat ride on the other side of Africa.

==== Botswana ====
Botswana contains nine African bush elephants (eight female, one male) in an exhibit of 4.5 acres (1.8 ha) stretching 0.25 miles (0.40 km) with a water pool at one end. The elephants do paintings and demos during weekends. The elephant walk features a flamingo pool, home to Chilean flamingos, black-necked swans and a Pink-backed Pelican. The Promenade leads guests into Botswana and a large bridge then connects Botswana to the rest of Africa.

A male African elephant, Tamani from Birmingham Zoo, (born at Lowry Park Zoo in 2005,) joined the zoo's then six older female elephants in October 2015 for socializing purposes, in hopes of pairing him with a younger female in the future. Hogle Zoo's monther-daughter African elephant duo Christie (b. 1986) and Zuri (b. 2009) permanently moved into this habitat in October 2023.

All 9 elephants at the zoo, and their origins, are as follows:

Christi (b. 1986, wild-born in Africa), arrived from Hogle Zoo in October 2023.

Lady (b. 1968, wild-born in Africa), arrived from Kings Island in July 1994.

Lea (b. 1978, wild-born in Zimbabwe), arrived from the wild in September 1982.

Lois (b. 1978, wild-born in Zimbabwe), arrived from the wild in September 1982.

Megan (b. 1978, wild-born in Kruger National Park, South Africa), arrived from Kings Island in July 1994.

Tamani (b. 2005, at Lowry Park Zoo), arrived from Birmingham Zoo in October 2015

Tattoo (b. 1978, wild-born in Africa), arrived from Riverbanks Zoo in May 1995.

Zoe (b. 1984, wild-born in Africa), arrived from Cameron Park Zoo in October 2007.

Zuri (b. 2009, at Hogle Zoo), arrived from Hogle Zoo in October 2023.

==== Kenya ====
Kenya has cheetahs (with an observation building), warthog, and a deck with a view of some springbok, lesser kudu, common eland, scimitar-horned oryx, and gray crowned cranes that roam across an African plain. Saddle-billed storks and Southern ground hornbills make up the wetland-themed exhibits on the opposite side of the walkway. At the boma area, replica huts simulate a Kenyan village which has lappet-faced vultures housed with white-necked ravens, Aldabra tortoises, bateleur eagles, red-flanked duikers, and blue duikers are worked into small exhibits. The walk-through Scrubland Aviary is home to several species of birds, including a white-cheeked turaco, white-faced whistling ducks, cattle egrets, a bare-faced go-away-bird, marbled ducks, lilac-breasted roller, taveta weavers, superb starlings, and a white-headed buffalo weaver, as well as side exhibits for red ruffed lemurs and silvery-cheeked hornbills.

==== Tanzania ====
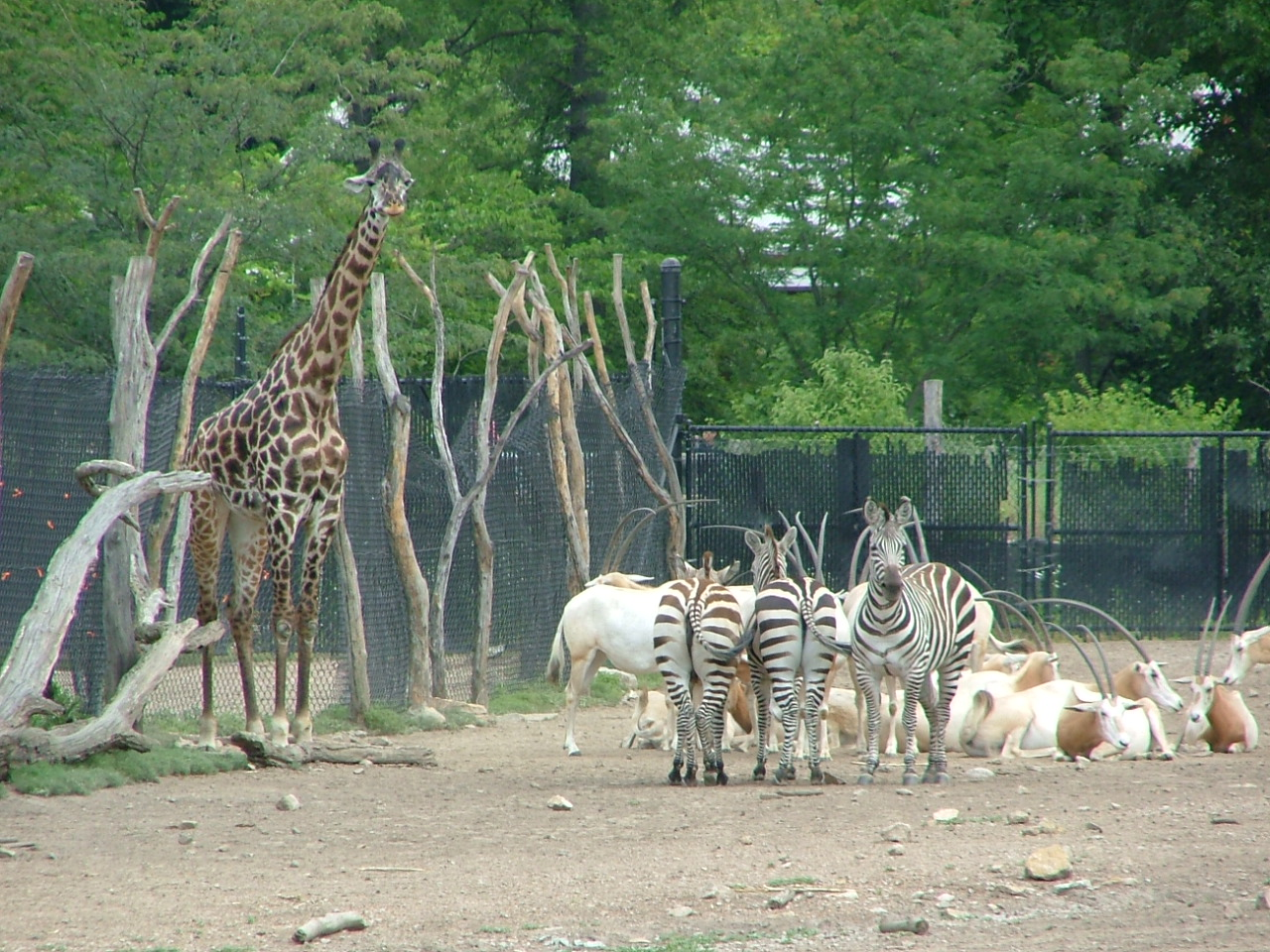
Giraffe, zebras, and scimitar oryx.

Tanzania features an African lion exhibit with 9 lions visible from a climate controlled observation building as well as a covered deck. Small exhibits that appear carved or surrounded by rock simulate a natural kopje; these include serval, bushbaby, caracal, black-footed cat, rock hyrax, masked and Fischer's lovebird, bat-eared fox, and black-throated monitor. A log-themed bridge crosses to the eastern black rhinoceros exhibit and a top-notch 3 acres (1.2 ha) enclosure housing chimpanzees. The chimpanzee observation building allows guests to view a very large area for a troop of 12 chimps to play and explore, and allows visitors to become educated on chimpanzees with a connected classroom. This side of the African plains features Masai giraffes, Grant's zebras, gray crowned cranes, and ostriches. Nearby are some ground birds, kori bustard and secretary bird, leopard tortoises, a small house with West African dwarf crocodiles, and a hippo pool.

==== Uganda ====
Uganda section has a small outdoor theater stage (Ruwenzori Theatre), and is home to spacious enclosures with African wild dogs and a troop of Guinea baboons, which sit adjacent to one another. A reservation-only campsite is located off into the woods from Uganda.

==== The Congolese Rainforest ====
The Congolese Rainforest is located across a historic swinging bridge from Kenya. Animals on exhibit include red-capped mangabey and black mangabey exhibits. Amur leopards are featured in an exhibit with an overhead area which visitors walk under. A raised pathway crosses through exhibits containing bongo, gray crowned crane, red river hog, and yellow-backed duiker exhibits nestled in the dense forest. A single bachelor western lowland gorilla and a separate breeding group of one male and three female western lowland gorillas can be viewed from a lookout building and from a renovated shelter with opportunities for up-close through-glass viewing.

=== Australia ===
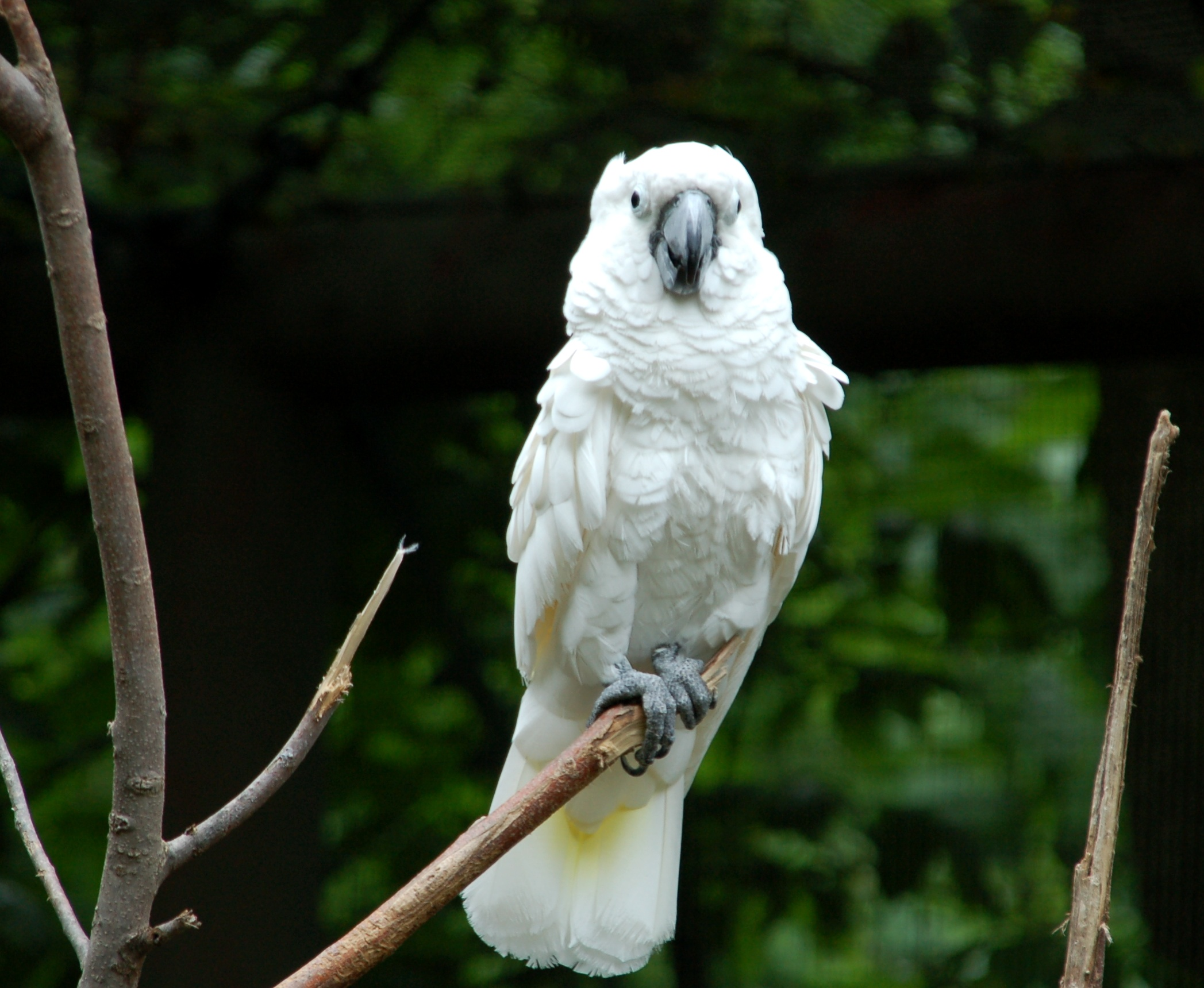
White cockatoo (Cacatua alba) in the Woodland Aviary.

Australia lies in the northernmost part of the zoo; there you can find a large field that is home to free-roaming red kangaroos. It features a walk-through Woodland Aviary, which includes black swans, tawny frogmouth, straw-necked ibis, pied imperial pigeon, silver gull, smew, magpie goose, cockatiel, eclectus parrot, plumed whistling duck, long-billed corella, chestnut teal, wompoo fruit dove, Australian shelduck, white cockatoo, and sulphur-crested cockatoo. Beside the exit to the aviary is an emu exhibit. Also featured are parma wallaby, Bennett's wallaby, dingo, and Matschie's tree kangaroo. A replica of an Australian sheep farm features a farmer's home, a building with various animal hides and preserves, spotted python, green tree python, a pair of laughing kookaburras, and a hands-on sheep pen. An exhibit with dromedary camels is just past the sheep farm. Overlooking the kangaroo field is a train station and snack bar, and the final exhibit on the loop is an indoor exhibit for snakes of Australia.

It was announced in 2015 that the zoo would welcome a pair of koalas as a featured attraction in the summer of 2016.

=== Tiger Trail ===
The Tiger Trail has been home to many types of animals over the years; and recently, the area was renovated to center around the return of tigers to the Kansas City Zoo and its native Asia. The region of the zoo features oriental plants, lanterns, statues and various pictures of Asian animals. The Francois langur is featured in the first enclosure. The path leads to a tunnel with Bali mynah and red panda. The langurs and the pandas swap exhibits according to outdoor conditions (pandas are outside in fall and winter, while in tunnel during spring and summer). The focal point of the Tiger Trail is the critically endangered Sumatran tiger exhibit, which is home to two male tigers. Other animals on exhibit are the wreathed hornbill and the lion-tailed macaque. Near the former ape house, Asian waterfowl, such as red-crowned crane, Mandarin duck, and common shelduck can be viewed in a wetlands exhibit.

==== Orangutan Canopy ====
After moving from the outdated Great Ape House in 2002, the Bornean orangutan were relocated to a new exhibit in Tiger Trail that featured a large outdoor "primadome." Originally intended only as a temporary home, work eventually began on August 17, 2014, on a $6 million new orangutan exhibit called Orangutan Canopy. The Zoological District along with many donors helped make Orangutan Canopy possible. The 3,400 square foot exhibit, which houses six Bornean orangutans in a more naturalistic outdoor environment than their previous two enclosures offered, opened to the public in May 2015.

=== KidZone ===
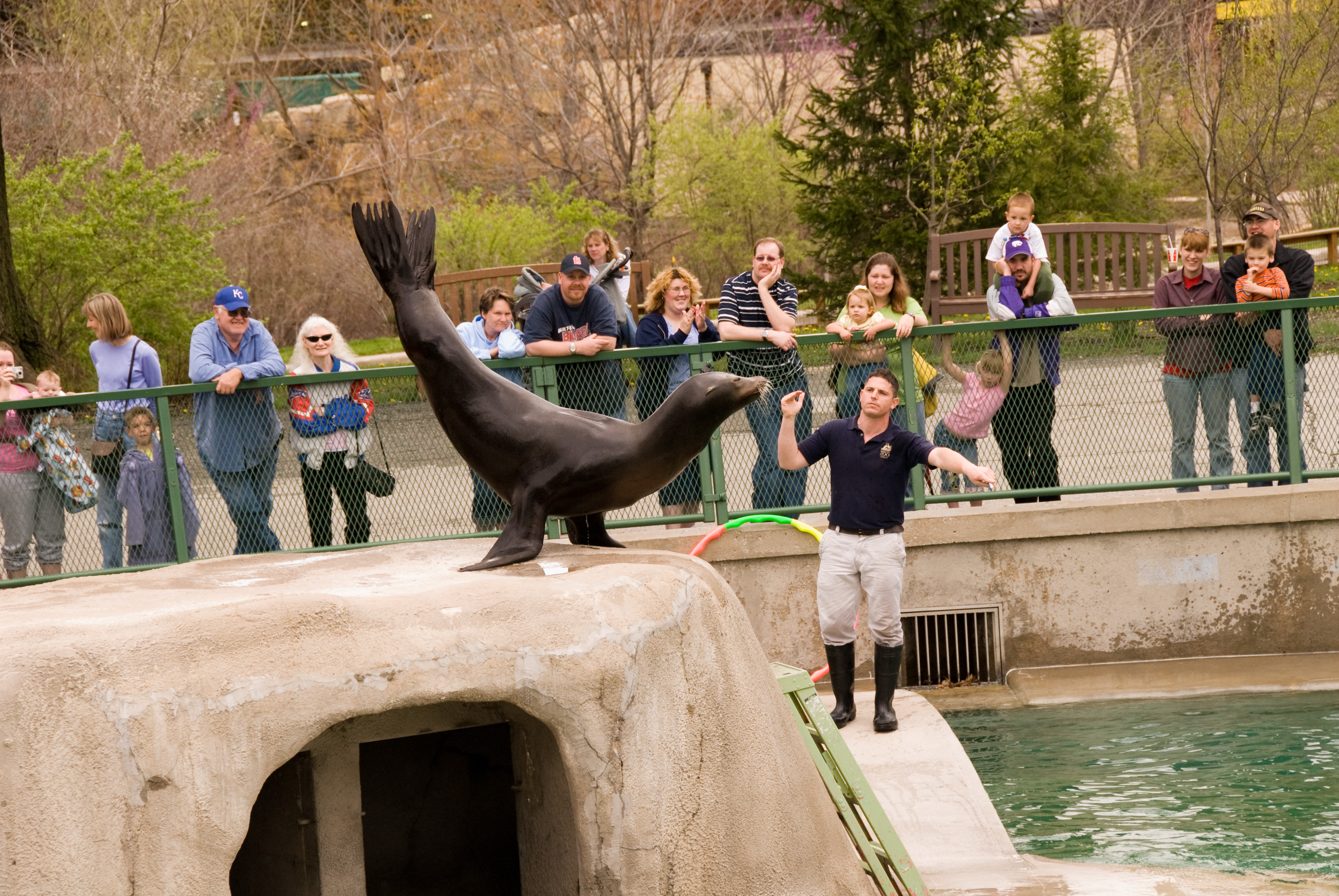
Sea lion show at the zoo.

The KidZone area features a large cage for rainbow lorikeets, with three daily feedings that guests may participate in. There is a large sea lion pool, which has several shows daily. The original 1909 building is located behind the sea lions, which has seen many renovations over the years and was most recently reopened in early 2009 as the Tropics House.

==== Discovery Barn ====
In the Discovery Barn, scarlet macaw, green-winged macaw, White's tree frog, hourglass tree frog, squirrel monkey, marine toad, American toad, radiated tortoise, Prevost's squirrel, Linne's two-toed sloth, ring-tailed lemur, and poison dart frog are housed alongside educational and fun features for children, including slides.

==== Tropics ====
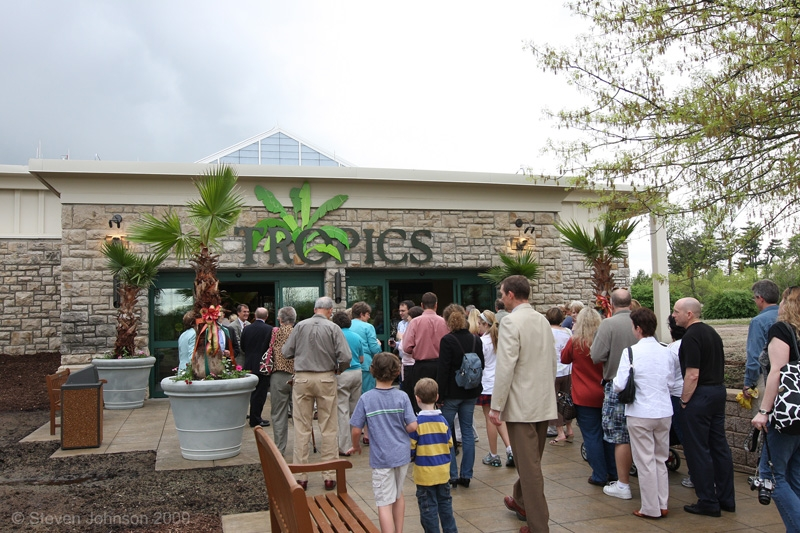
Entrance to the Tropics exhibit.

Tropics is housed in the zoo's original building. The structure opened in summer 1909 and it was built at a cost of $32,000. It housed the zoo's entire collection. Originally known as the "Bird and Carnivora House", it featured a gabled roof heavily ornamented with architectural terra cotta and a large arching window. The gabled ends and eaves featured decorative carved stone bird heads – kingfishers, owls, and parrots. The original roof was removed in 1969 due to the badly deteriorating wooden framing. The building was closed in the 1990s, before reopening after a minor renovation in 2002. The building, used at that time for a traveling reptile exhibit, closed again in 2004 before undergoing much more extensive renovations. Following extensive renovation, the building reopened as Tropics in May 2009.

In the Tropics House, saki monkeys, golden lion tamarin, white-cheeked gibbon, blue monkey, small-clawed otter, capybara, prehensile-tailed porcupine, mona monkey, Crested Porcupine, crested screamer, green aracari, and freshwater stingray are housed in a 13,000 square feet (1,200 m^{2}) building. Exotic plant species and a vaulted glass roof for natural light are also included. The enclosure's first birth came when Abby and Indigo, the zoo's blue monkey couple, welcomed their newborn baby on November 4, 2009.

==== Helzberg Penguin Plaza ====
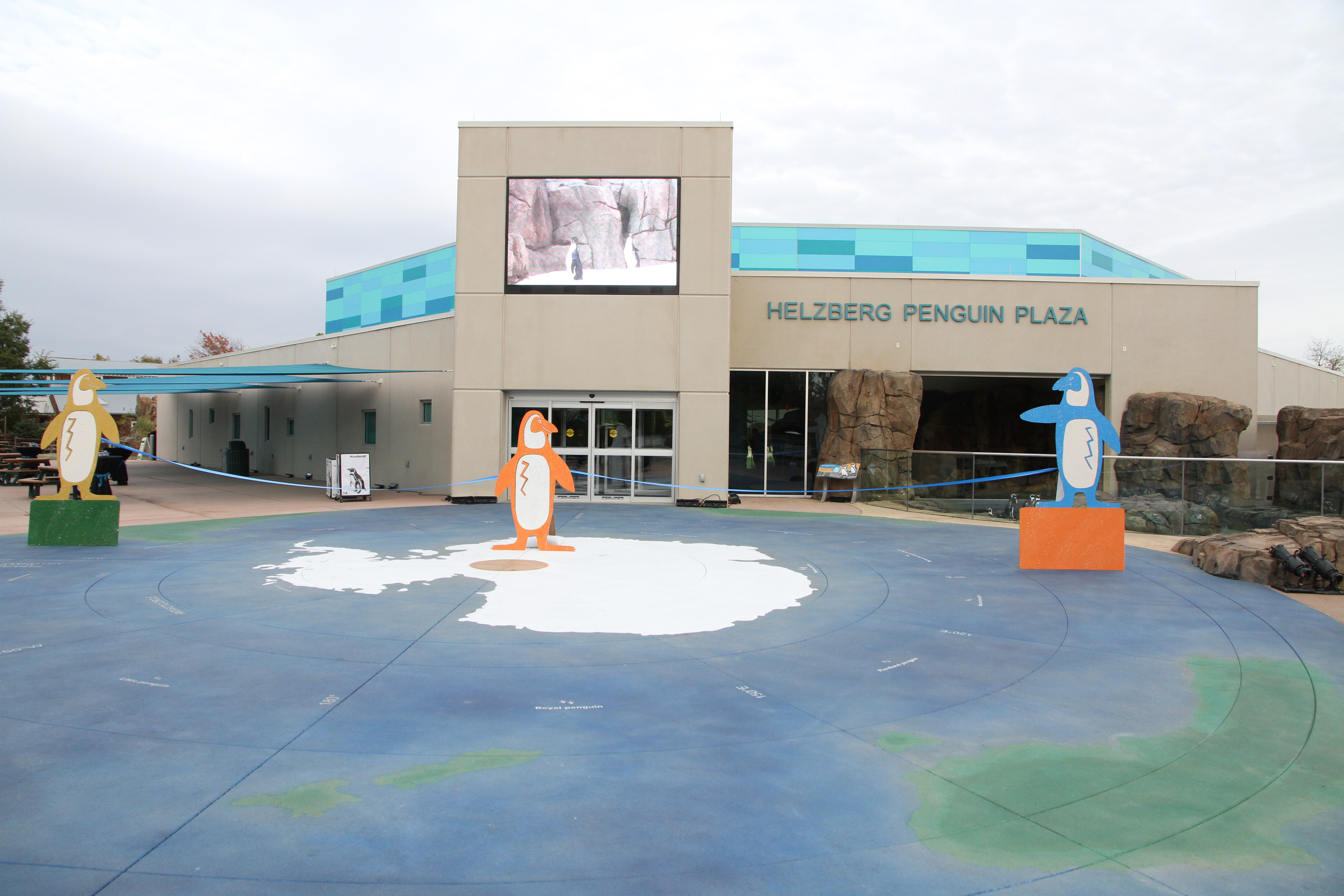
Entrance of the Helzberg Penguin Plaza.

The Helzberg Penguin Plaza opened on October 25, 2013. The 19,000 square feet (1,800 m^{2}) facility features a 100,000 US gallons (379,000 L) cold water tank built for cold water penguins and a 25,000 US gallons (95,000 L) pool for warm weather penguins. Four species of penguins — king, gentoo, rockhopper, and Humboldt — are housed in the building alongside smaller aquarium exhibits featuring fish, jelly fish, and a coral reef display.

=== The Valley ===
The Valley area of the zoo opened in 1912, and it served as a primary portion of the zoo for many years. The first exhibits were a bear pit and a duck pond on the east side of the Valley. In 1914, a grizzly bear named Nemo was brought to the zoo from Yellowstone National Park. Nemo escaped from his enclosure in the Valley after bending the bars around his exhibit and scaling the rock bluff. The bear was eventually found 18 days later in a pool at a local cemetery.

In 1932, the Works Progress Administration funded a major expansion project in the Valley. The project was never fully completed, but it was used as a small grotto for smaller mammal exhibits. Through the years, the small grotto was home to various animals including Arctic foxes, hyenas, colobus monkeys, binturong, coatimundi, river otters, aardwolf, red pandas, maned wolves, white-tailed sea eagles and king vultures. Most of the structural work completed by the WPA remains intact, and the zoo planned to preserve the historical elements of the original 1912 bear pit, the 1932 WPA small grotto and Monkey Island by incorporating them into the construction of a new polar bear exhibit. Other issues with the location forced the new polar bear exhibit to be relocated to the Front Entry Plaza. The old structures in the Valley remain unused until a new development plan is announced that will incorporate their historically significant features.

Monkey Island was the centerpiece of the Valley. The island was surrounded by a moat 20 feet (6.1 m) wide and 6 feet (1.8 m) deep. The Monkey Island exhibit opened in June 1946 with rhesus monkeys. Fifteen years after the exhibit opened, 30 mangabeys escaped. Many of the mangabeys were lured back to the exhibit with food; however, eleven remained loose for the entire summer until they were eventually captured as the weather began to turn cooler. Monkey Island was demolished in 1992 and replaced by a new exhibit for red pandas, musk deer, and maned wolf.

Most of the Valley was closed in 2002 and it was entirely closed by 2005. A flamingo pond borders the outside edge of the valley and it remains in use. The old aviary row became Beaks and Feet Boulevard, with exhibits for Indian peafowl, green iguana, military and green-winged macaws, spectacled owl, Swainson's toucan, black-billed magpie, golden lion tamarin, red-handed tamarin, and bobcat. As of 2023, Beaks and Feet Boulevard has been removed, and most of the area is now taken up by the Sobela Ocean Aquarium, with the Chilean flamingo pond being the last remaining exhibit still in use from The Valley.

=== Great Ape House ===
The former Great Ape House at the Kansas City Zoo as it appeared in August 2012

The zoo's former Great Ape House was a distinctive architectural landmark in Kansas City since it was completed in 1966. At the time of its construction, it was heralded as a modern marvel. The Great Ape house's distinctive mid-century design had been compared to structures in Disney's Tomorrowland, as well as the Liverpool Metropolitan Cathedral. In its earlier years, the ape house served as a central identity for the zoo, appearing on postcards and numerous zoo souvenirs. At the time it was opened, the 55 feet (17 m) tall circular building was home to seven gibbons, five chimpanzees, two orangutans and two gorillas.

Eventually the apes were all relocated to different areas of the zoo with only orangutans remaining in the exhibit by the time it was closed in 2003, with the opening of their new enclosure in Tiger Trail. Following its closure, supporters have pushed for its redevelopment for other uses due to its iconic architectural significance as a recognizable landmark. Discussion of the ape house's demolition began as early as 2001; however, the possibility of redevelopment has emerged as support for the zoo has increased dramatically since then. While it was still in operation, former zoo director Ernest Hagler suggested moving out the animals and turning the building into a gift shop or restaurant. It was never re-purposed and after sitting empty for over a decade, the building was ultimately demolished in September 2015, to make room for a new addition to the zoo, tentatively titled Predator Canyon. As of 2023, the former site has been converted to the Outback Campground, which can be reserved for overnight events.

== Transportation ==
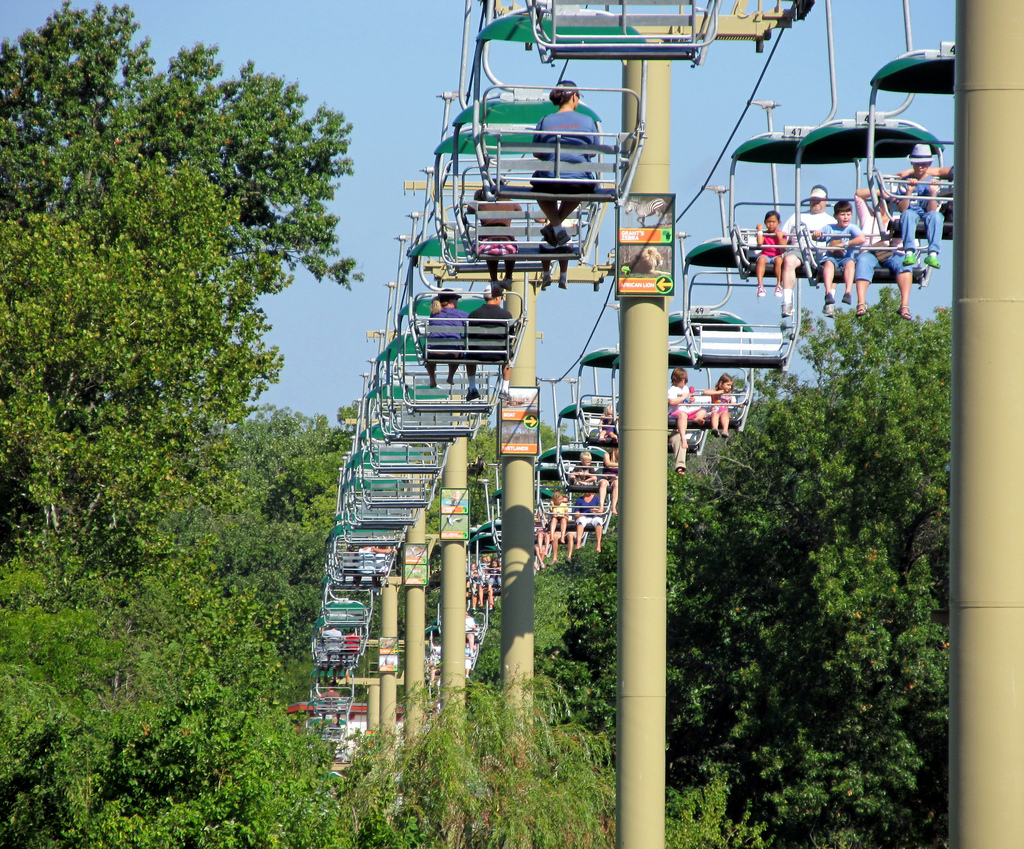
African Sky Safari, a modified ski lift

Zebra Trams

A zebra-themed tram takes zoo guests along the African elephants and flamingos, from the World Gate to the African section of the zoo known as "Nanyuki Market" (in Kenya).

Kansas City Zoo Railroad

A mini train takes visitors around the main area of the zoo with stops at World Gate and Australia. Dromedary camels and kangaroos can be seen from the ride.

Kenyan Cruise Boat Ride

A boat takes visitors (Memorial Day through Labor Day) for an up-close view of the African savannah animals, such as the Masai giraffe, lesser kudu and scimitar-horned oryx. Formerly known as the Lake Nakuru Boat Ride.

African Sky Safari

A modified ski lift that goes over the middle of the Africa section from the marketplace to the chimpanzees. Riders may choose to ride a round-trip or get off on the other side. The Sky Safari opened to the public in the summer of 2011.

== Gallery ==
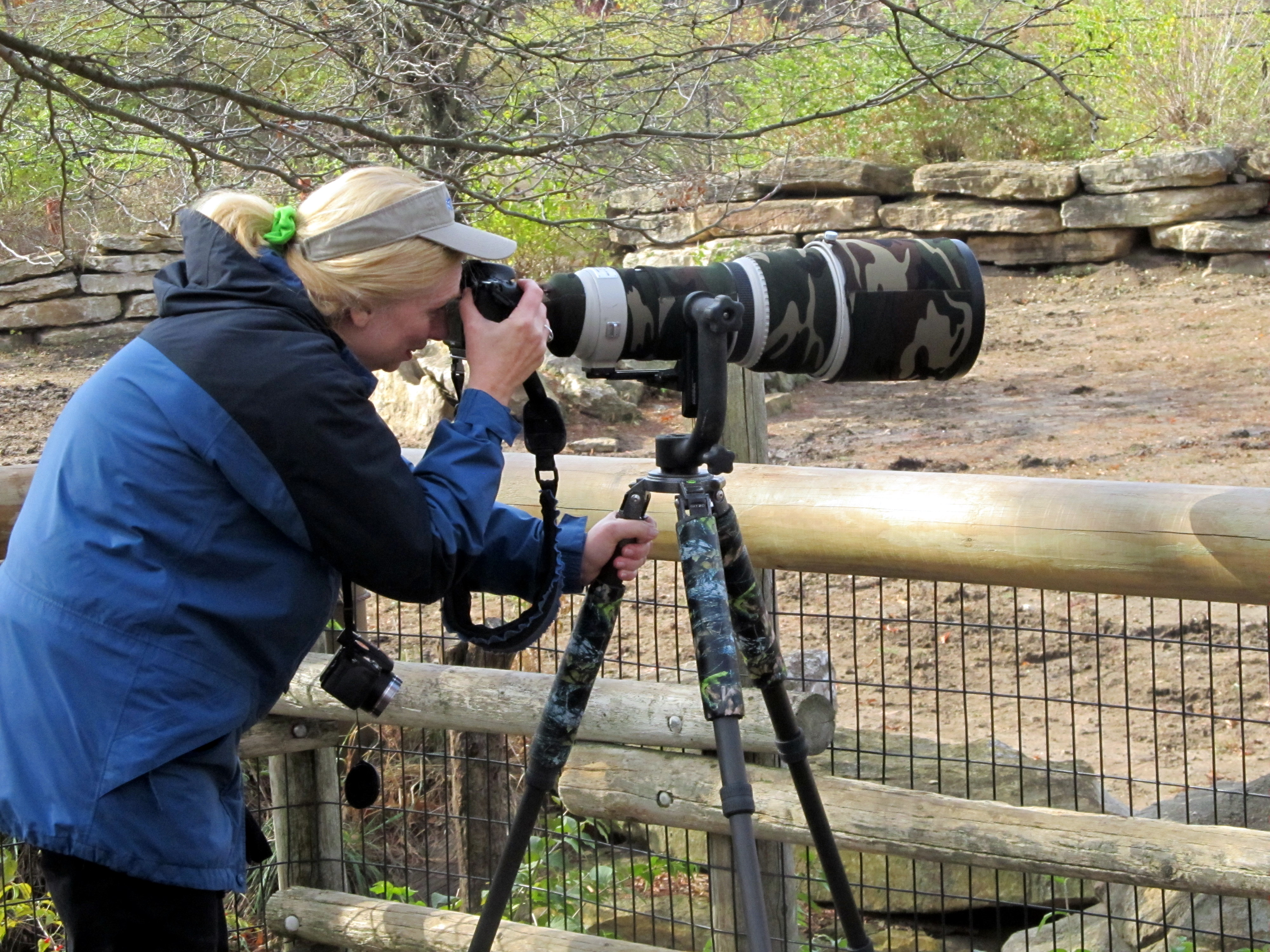
Professional photographer taking nature photos at the zoo.

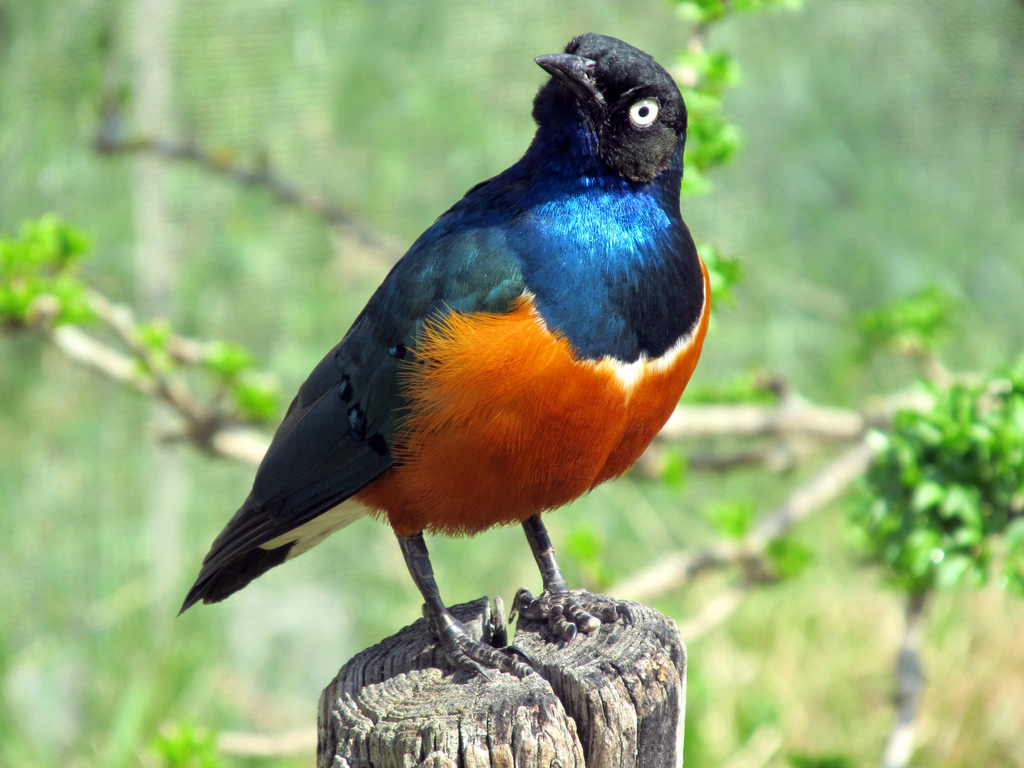
Superb starling (Lamprotornis superbus).

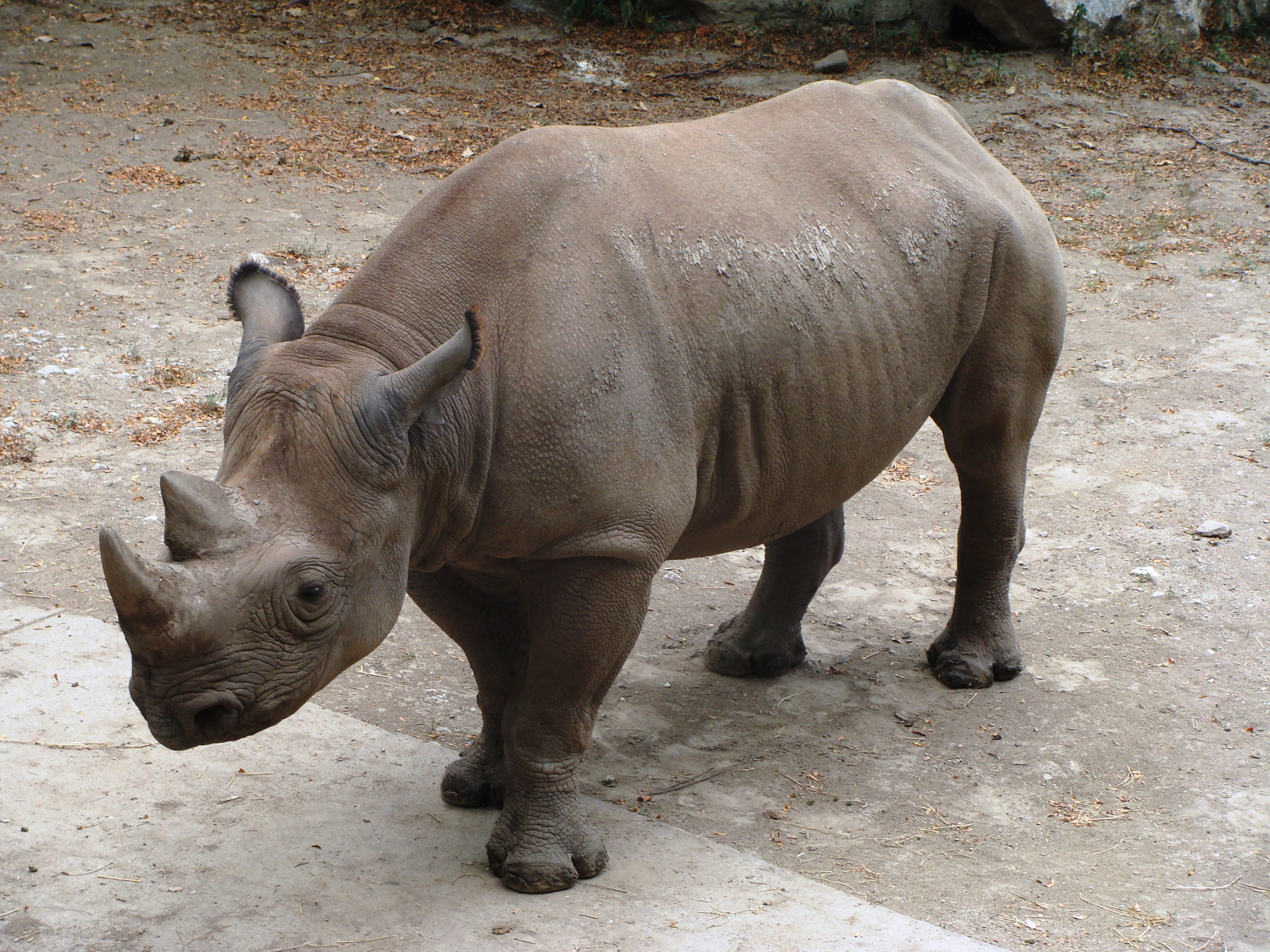
Rhinoceros.

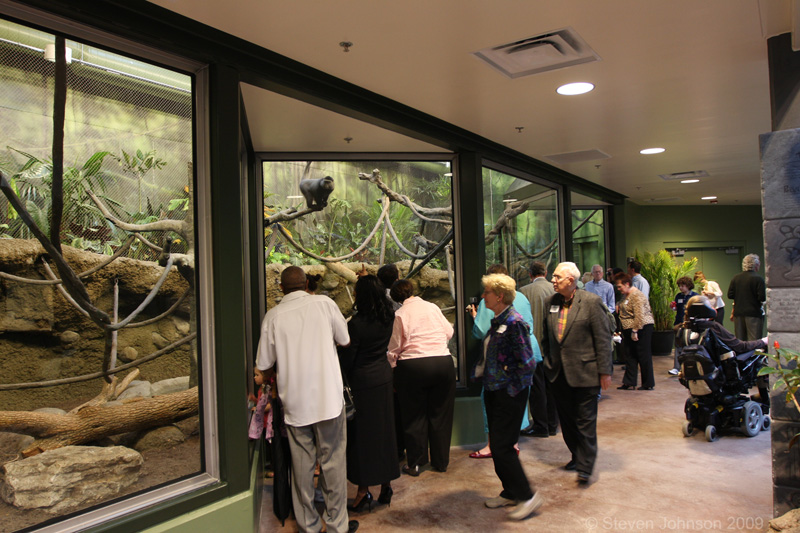
Inside the Tropics exhibit.

Blue monkey with newborn child in the Tropics exhibit.

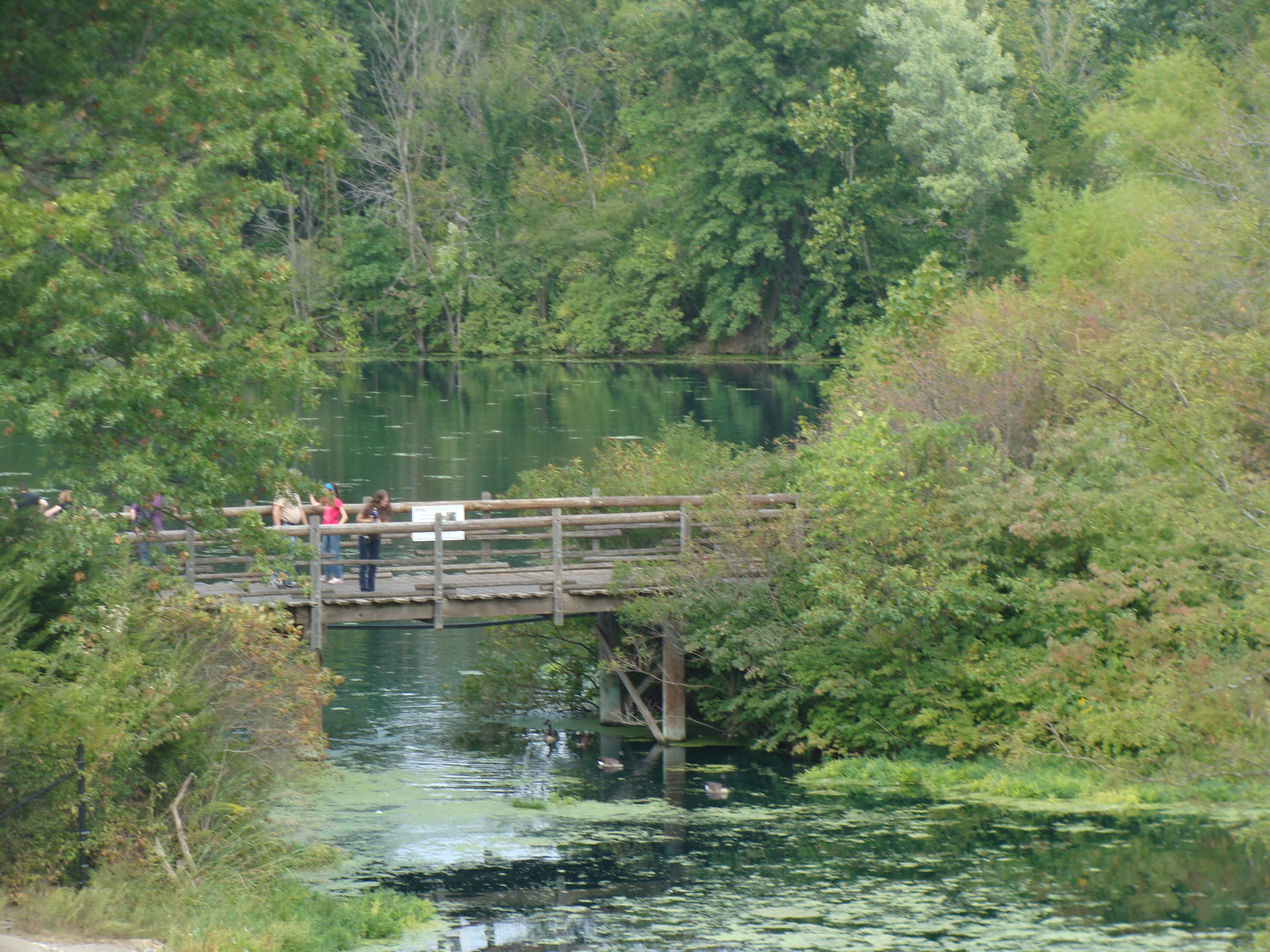
Bridge walkway in one of the nature settings.

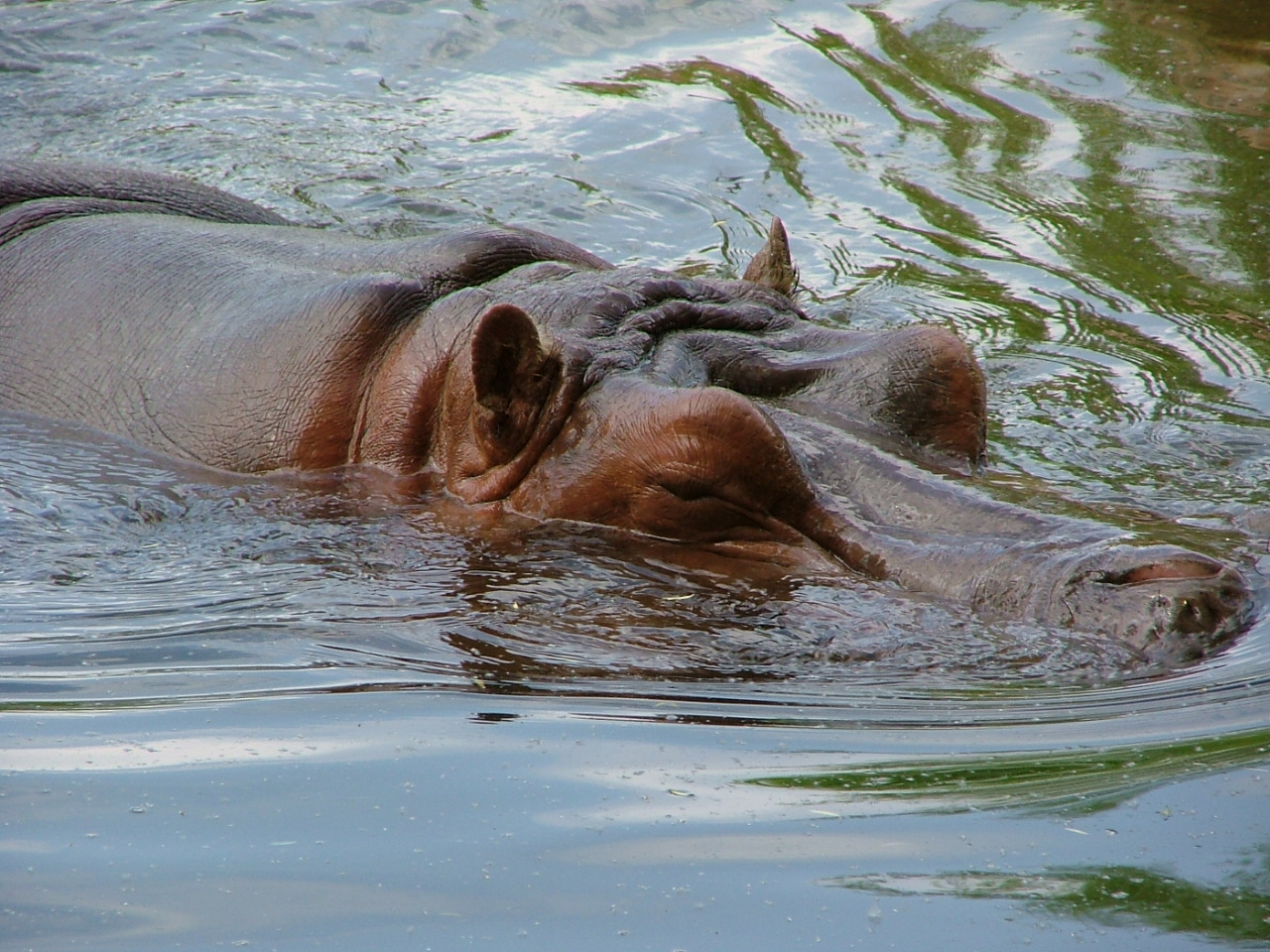
Hippopotamus.

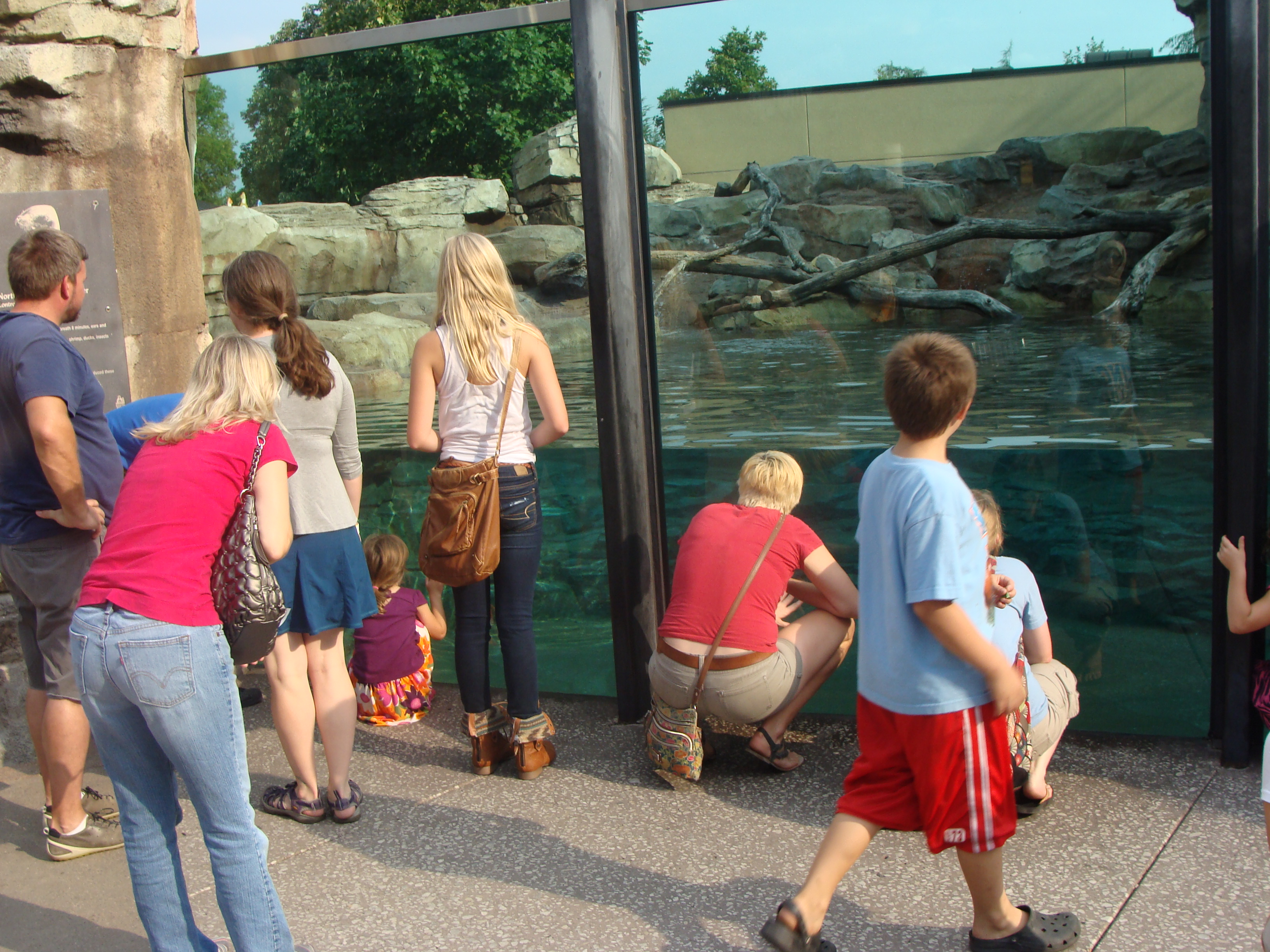
Otter exhibit.

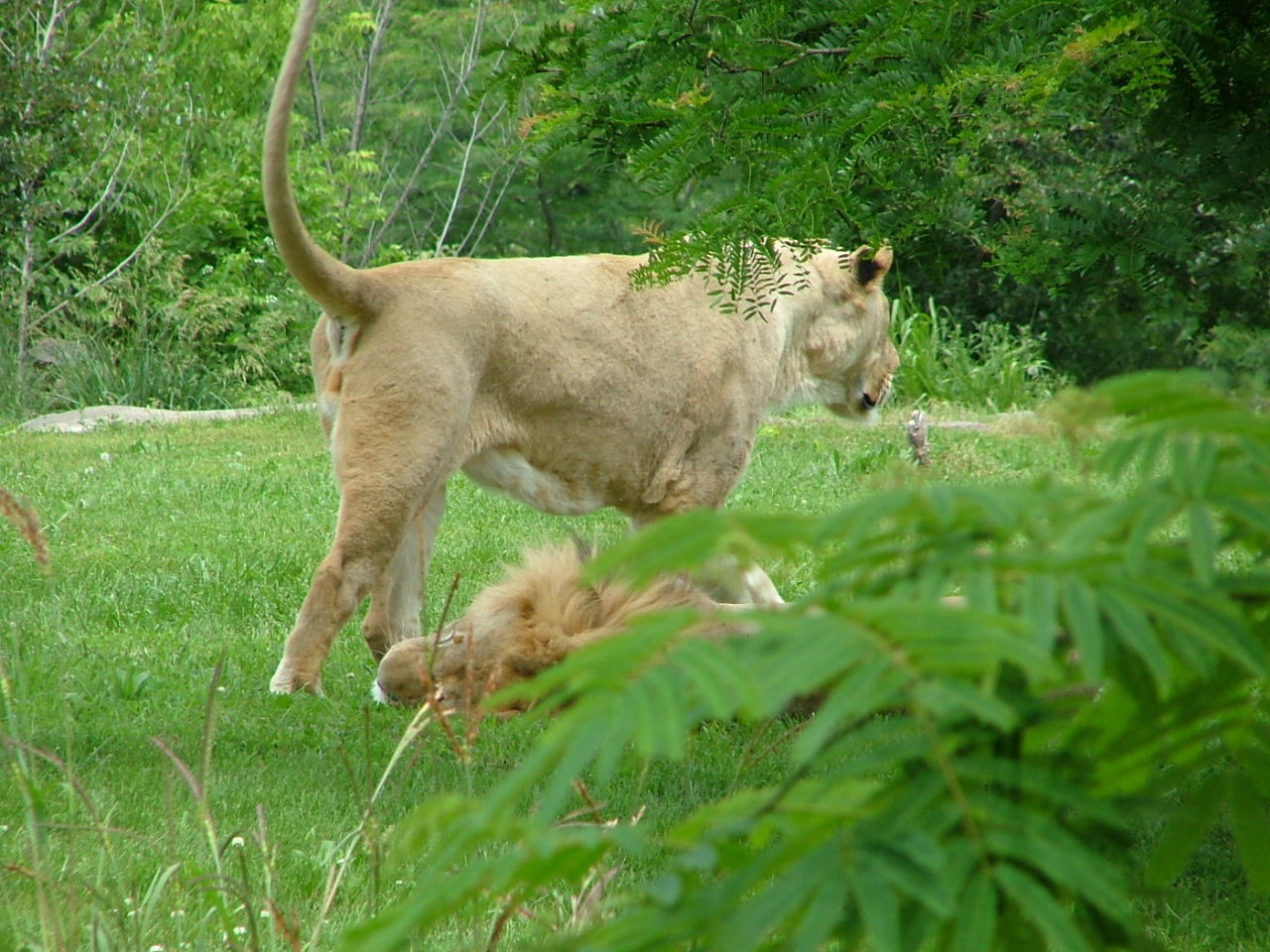
Lion and lioness at the zoo.

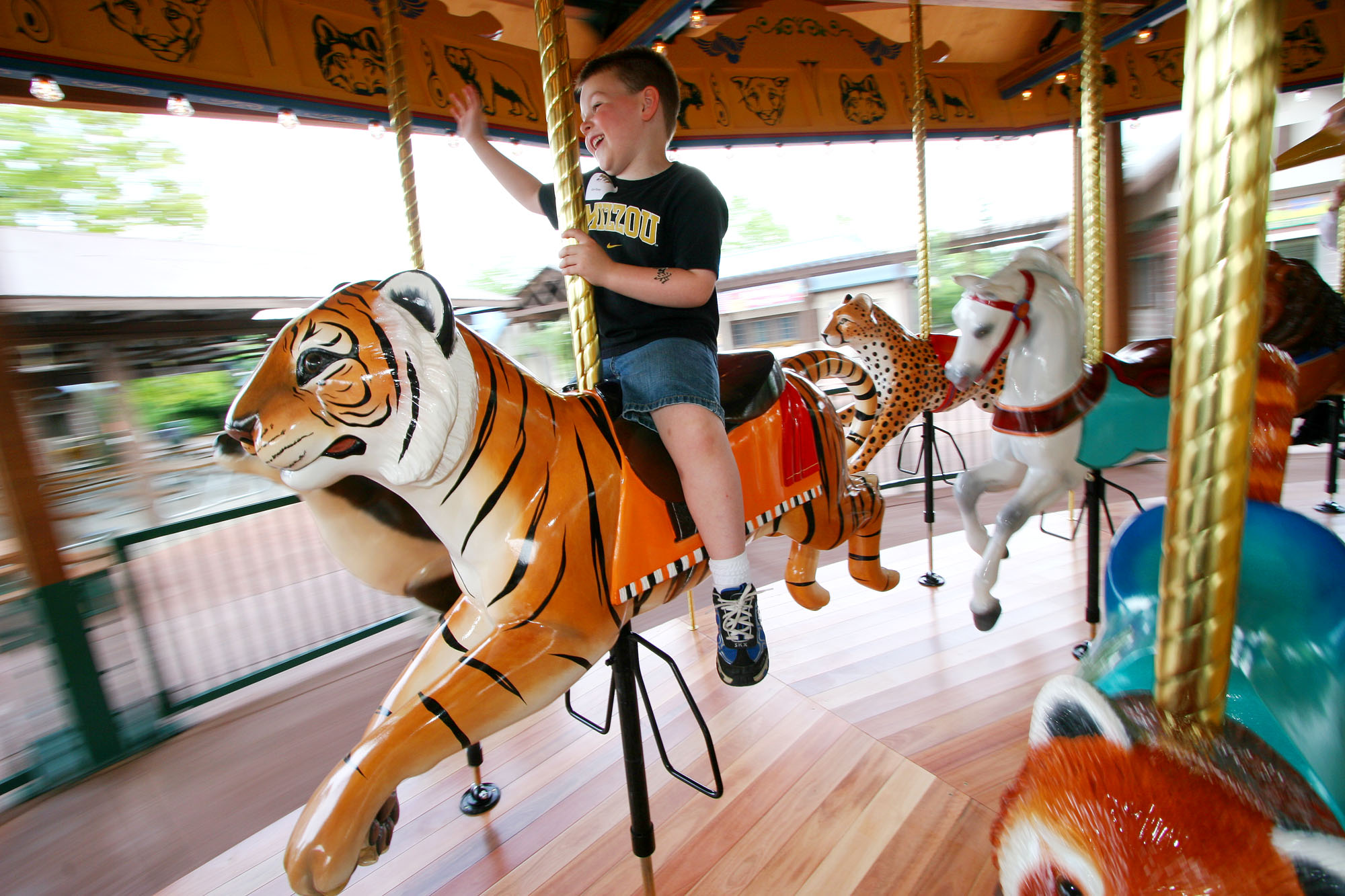
Carousel at the zoo.

== Escapes ==
On February 19, 2012, two adult gorillas escaped from their enclosure when their door was accidentally left open. The gorillas were quickly captured after they wandered around the building they were housed in for a few minutes and no one was injured or threatened.

On April 10, 2014, seven chimpanzees escaped from their enclosure when one of the animals used a log to scale the wall. The zoo was put on lockdown and visitors were kept safe inside designated buildings throughout the zoo until all seven chimpanzees had been returned to their exhibit.

On May 29, 2019, an elephant escaped its enclosure after scaling a wall. It was returned to its enclosure safely within an hour.
