= Kessler Park (Kansas City, Missouri) =

Public park in Kansas City, Missouri

- Interactive map of Kessler Park
- Location: Kansas City, Missouri
- Coordinates: 39°06′45″N 94°32′49″W
- Area: 300 acres (120 ha)
- Created: 1899; 127 years ago
- Owned by: The City of Kansas City, Missouri
- Operated by: Parks and Recreation; Kessler Park Conservancy

Kessler Park is a 300-acre (120 ha) park in the Historic Northeast area of Kansas City, Missouri. It is the city's second-largest park after Swope Park, and an early cornerstone of its parks and boulevard system. The park's design mostly preserved its original dramatic natural topography, including steep limestone bluffs overlooking the East Bottoms and the Missouri River.

The park's history reflects the Gilded Age ambition of its creators and the influence of the national City Beautiful movement. The parks and boulevard system shows the city's aspiration beyond a commercial hub, to become a beautiful and livable city. Kessler Park is a significant embodiment of George E. Kessler's philosophy within City Beautiful, and is a centerpiece of the launch of the new parks and boulevard system that transformed Kansas City.

== History ==
=== Background and design (1892–1893) ===
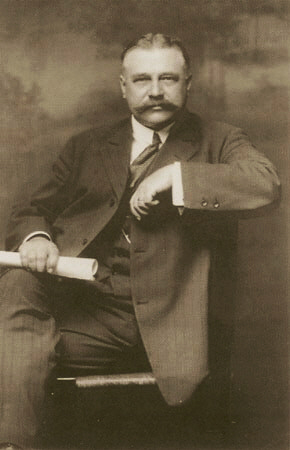
George Kessler was the city's master landscape architect, and designer of the new Parks and Boulevards system.

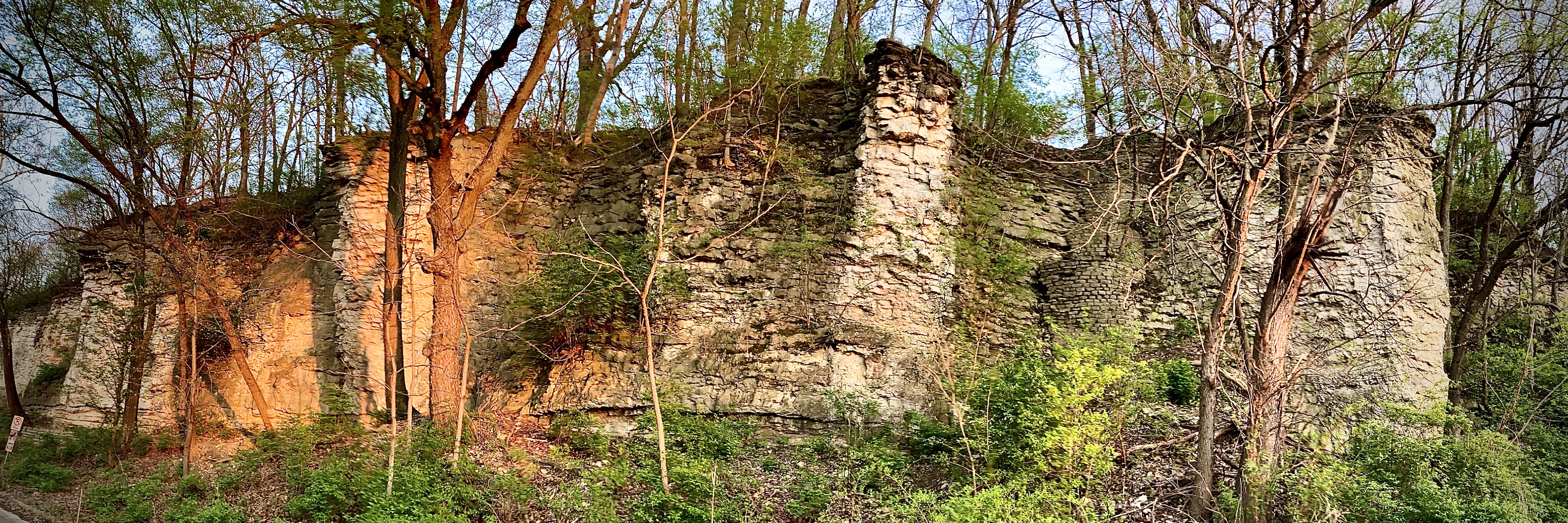
The limestone bluffs along Cliff Drive are primarily composed of the Bethany Falls Limestone Member, which is a stratigraphic unit within the Swope Formation of the Kansas City Group. This gray, wavy-bedded rock face has characteristic vertical jointing and a mottled texture, defining the natural escarpment preserved within Kessler Park.

In the late 19th century, Kansas City became a national nexus of railroads and cattle trails that had grown from a frontier town into a major center of commerce. This growth was chaotic; the landscape was a mix of industry and housing, affected by factory smoke and unpaved, muddy streets. Civic leaders, including the wealthy mining magnate August R. Meyer, sought to add civic dignity and aesthetic grace to the city's commercial might. This goal aligned with the rise of the City Beautiful movement, a national crusade that began after the 1893 World's Columbian Exposition in Chicago. The movement held that beautiful, orderly urban environments could produce better citizens and that well-designed parks were not luxuries but essential infrastructure.

The city found its visionary in George E. Kessler, a German-born and European-educated landscape architect and engineer. In 1892, Meyer became president of the newly established Board of Park Commissioners and appointed Kessler with the title "Engineer to the Board", to emphasize the practical utility of his work to the public. The result of their partnership was the 1893 Report of Park and Boulevard Commissioners. In it, Kessler laid out a revolutionary, city-wide network of parks and boulevards guided by a core philosophy to work with the city's challenging topography. He viewed its "steep hills and river bluffs, the creek beds and gorges" not as problems, but as "aesthetic assets". This vision for an integrated system was one of the first of its kind in America.

=== Construction and early development (1899 – c. 1920) ===
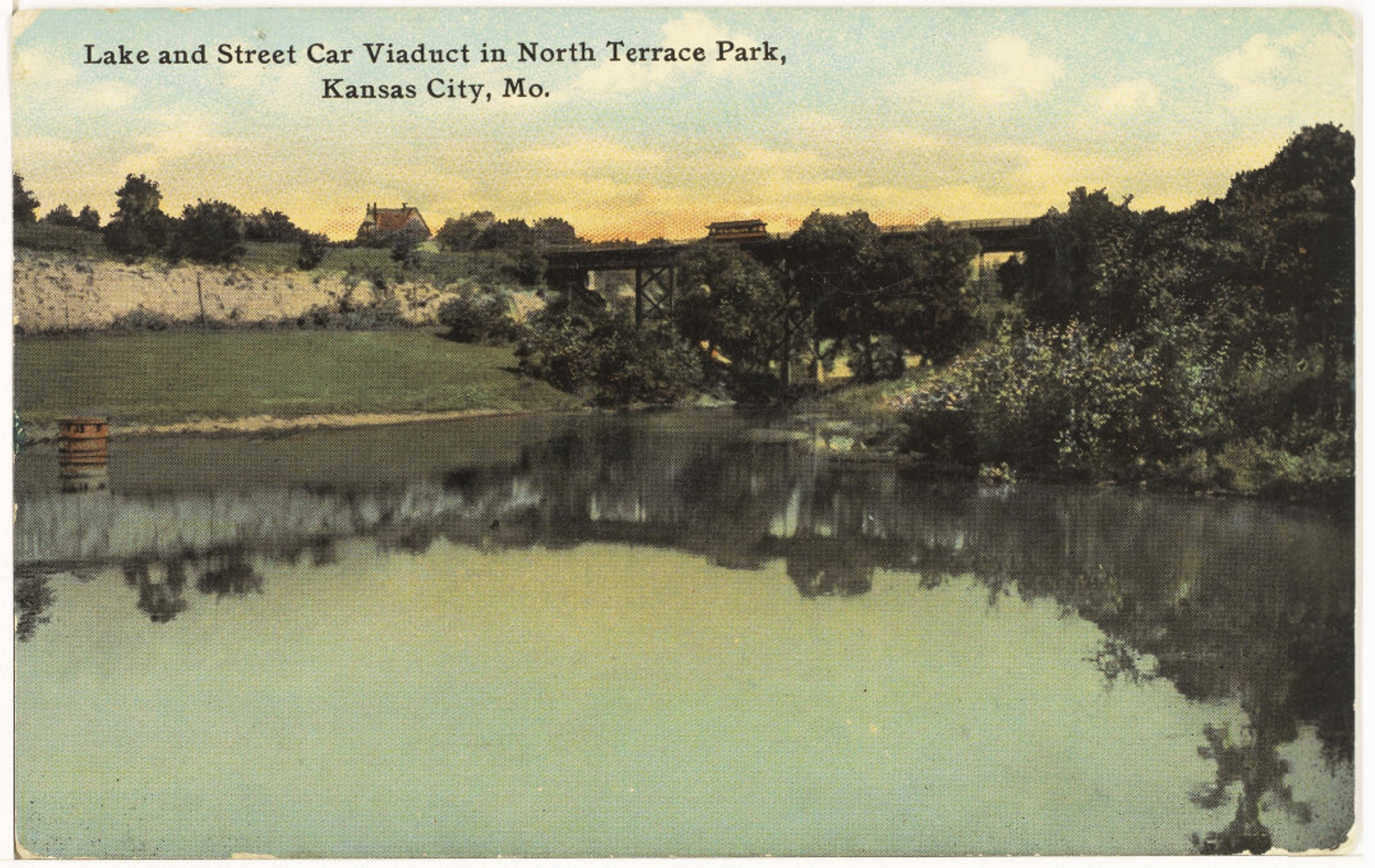
At the turn of the 20th century, the south side of North Terrace Lake had a new streetcar viaduct (built 1899) carrying Lexington Street at the top left.

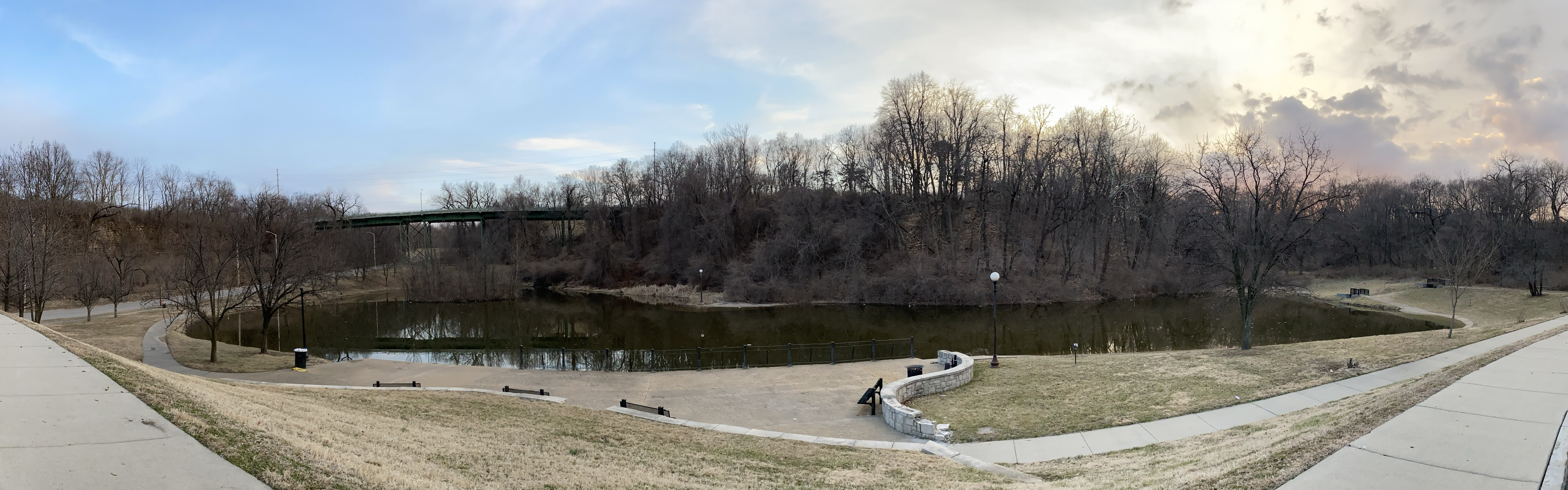
The south side of North Terrace Lake has the viaduct carrying what became Lexington Avenue at the top left (2020).

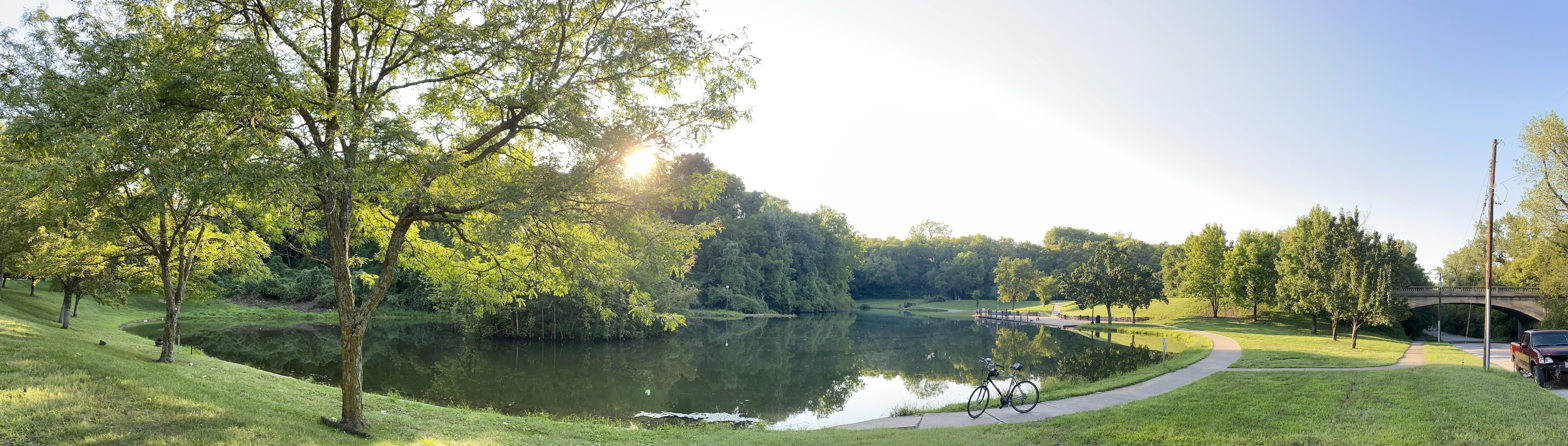
North Terrace Lake, looking west from Chestnut Trafficway (2021)

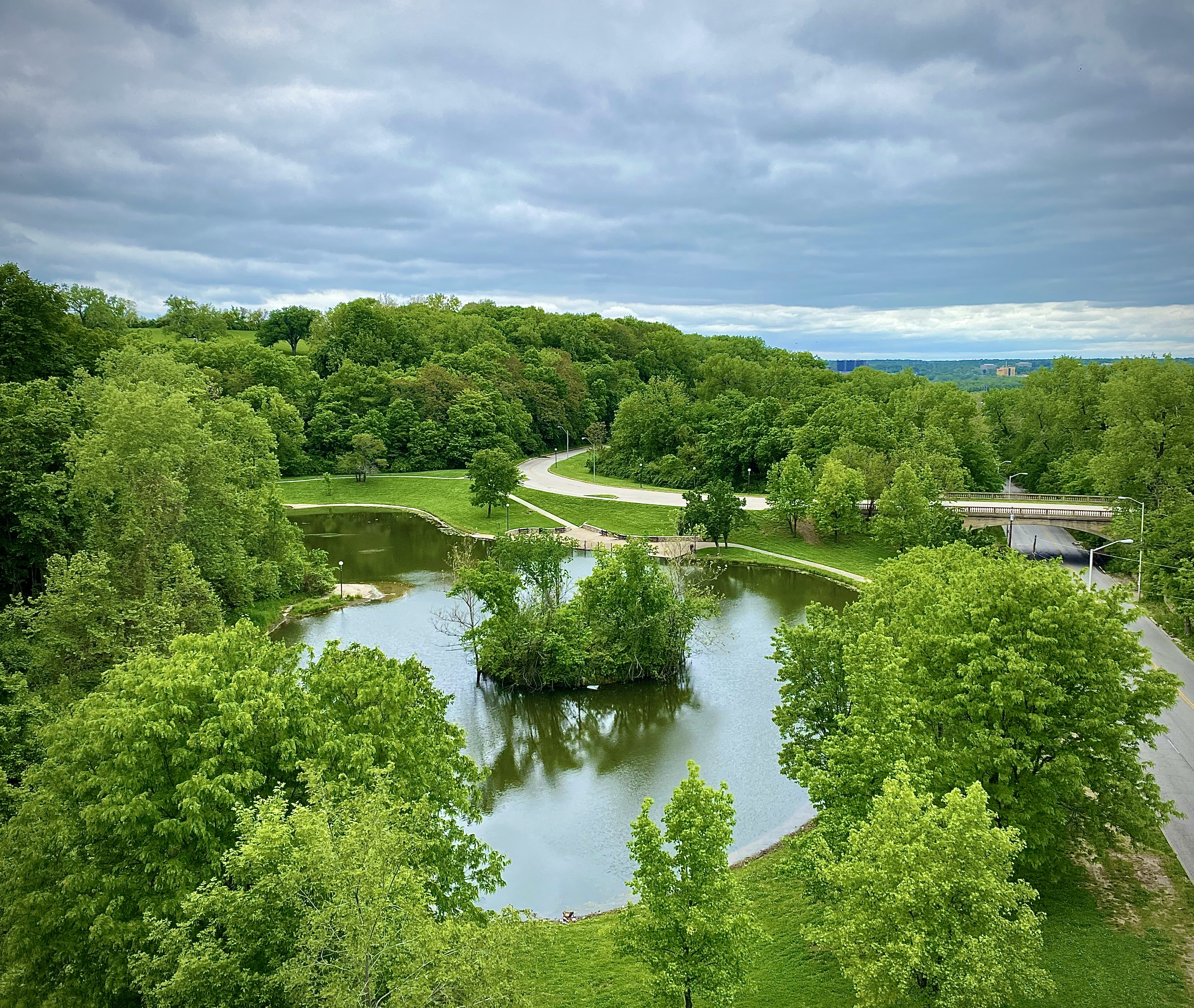
The Lexington Avenue bridge overlooks North Terrace Lake.

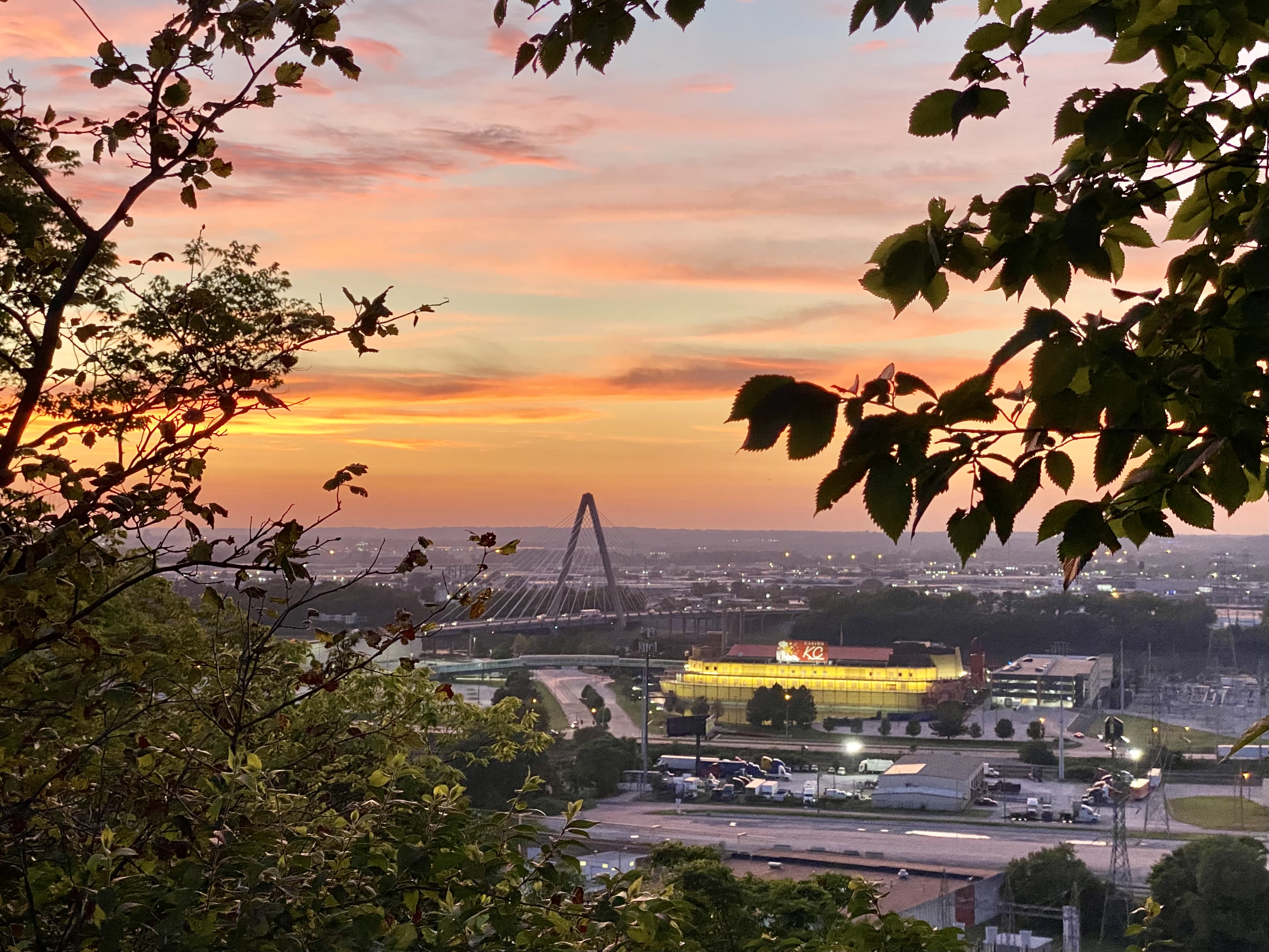
Lookout Point overlooks East Bottoms, Bally's casino, New Paseo Bridge, and the Northland of Kansas City.

With a few exceptions, this entire property should always be maintained as a rugged, picturesque place, and very little attempt on the hillsides and valleys at so-called improvements in the form of fine lawns and garden schemes.

— George Kessler

The creation of the park, initially named North Terrace Park, began with acquiring a dramatic swath of land overlooking the Missouri River. A significant portion of the property belonged to the family of Reverend Nathan Scarritt, who moved to the area in 1862 to escape Civil War violence, and whose willingness to deed parts of their estate to the city was instrumental. The proposal was met with intense public skepticism and critics derided the site as "too rugged for a goat to climb". After the city won a legal battle for the right to condemn the land that went to the Missouri Supreme Court, construction began in 1899.

The spring-fed North Terrace Lake was a major early feature. Its immediate surroundings were nicknamed Canyon City Park because of its deep bowl terrain.

The park's centerpiece became Cliff Drive, a 4.5 miles (7.2 km) road established in 1900 and designated Missouri's only urban scenic byway. Contractor John Mahoney's crews undertook the perilous work of blasting through solid limestone, with drops of over 200 feet (61 m) in some areas, to create the roadbed. Mahoney died on Cliff Drive in 1910 when his car crashed on an icy day. Kessler envisioned it for quiet carriage rides and worried about "automobile speed-maniacs", but the arrival of the automobile created immediate conflict. In 1903, a car spooked a horse, so the park board banned all motorized vehicles, but the powerful Kansas City Automobile Club successfully lobbied for the ban's repeal.

In 1908, the park's primary architectural feature, The Colonnade, was built on The Concourse. The elegant, open-air Beaux-Arts pavilion was designed by Henry Wright, an architect in Kessler's office, as a formal vista for admiring the landscape.

=== Mid-century changes and decline (1921 – c. 1980) ===
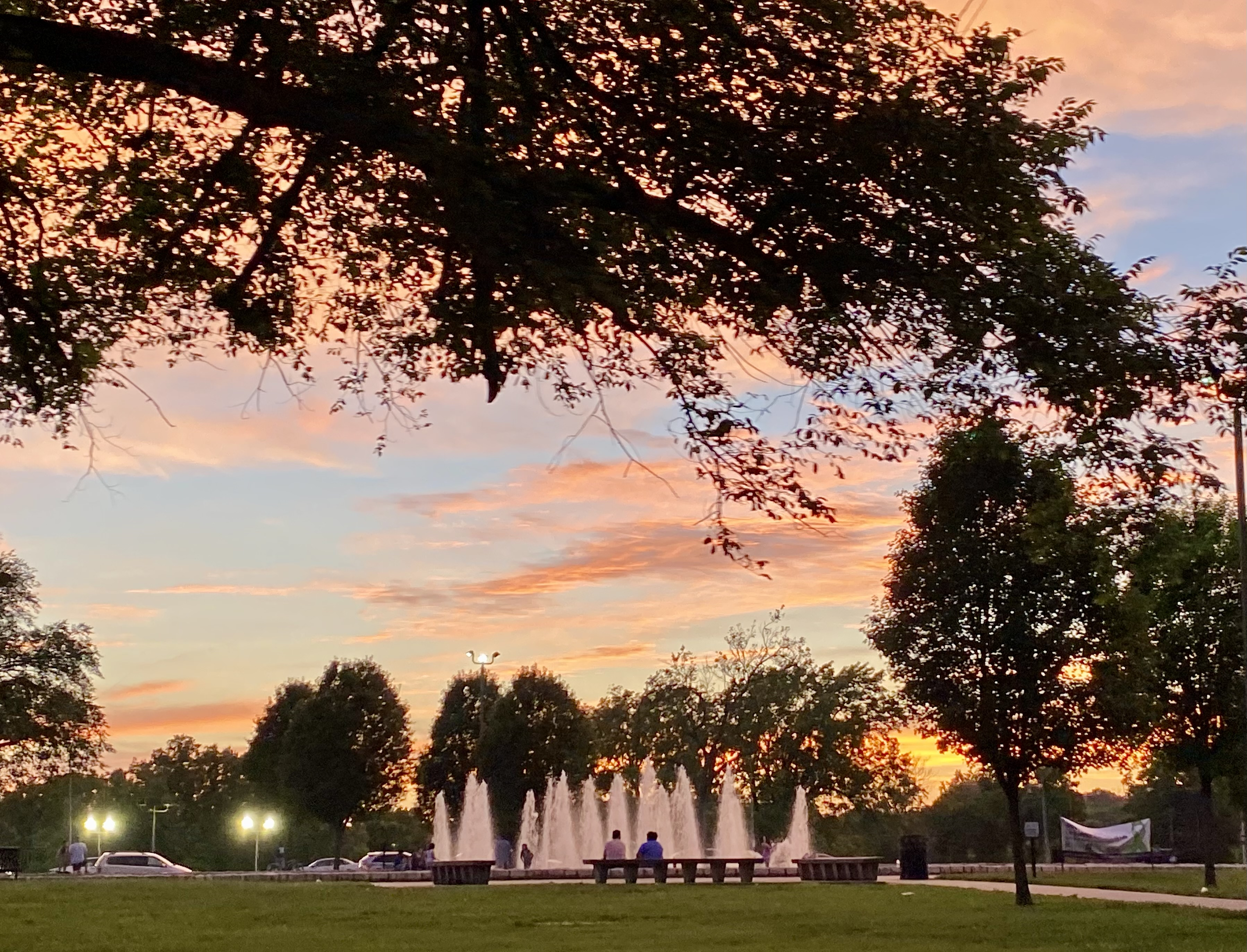
Sunset at the fountains of the Concourse

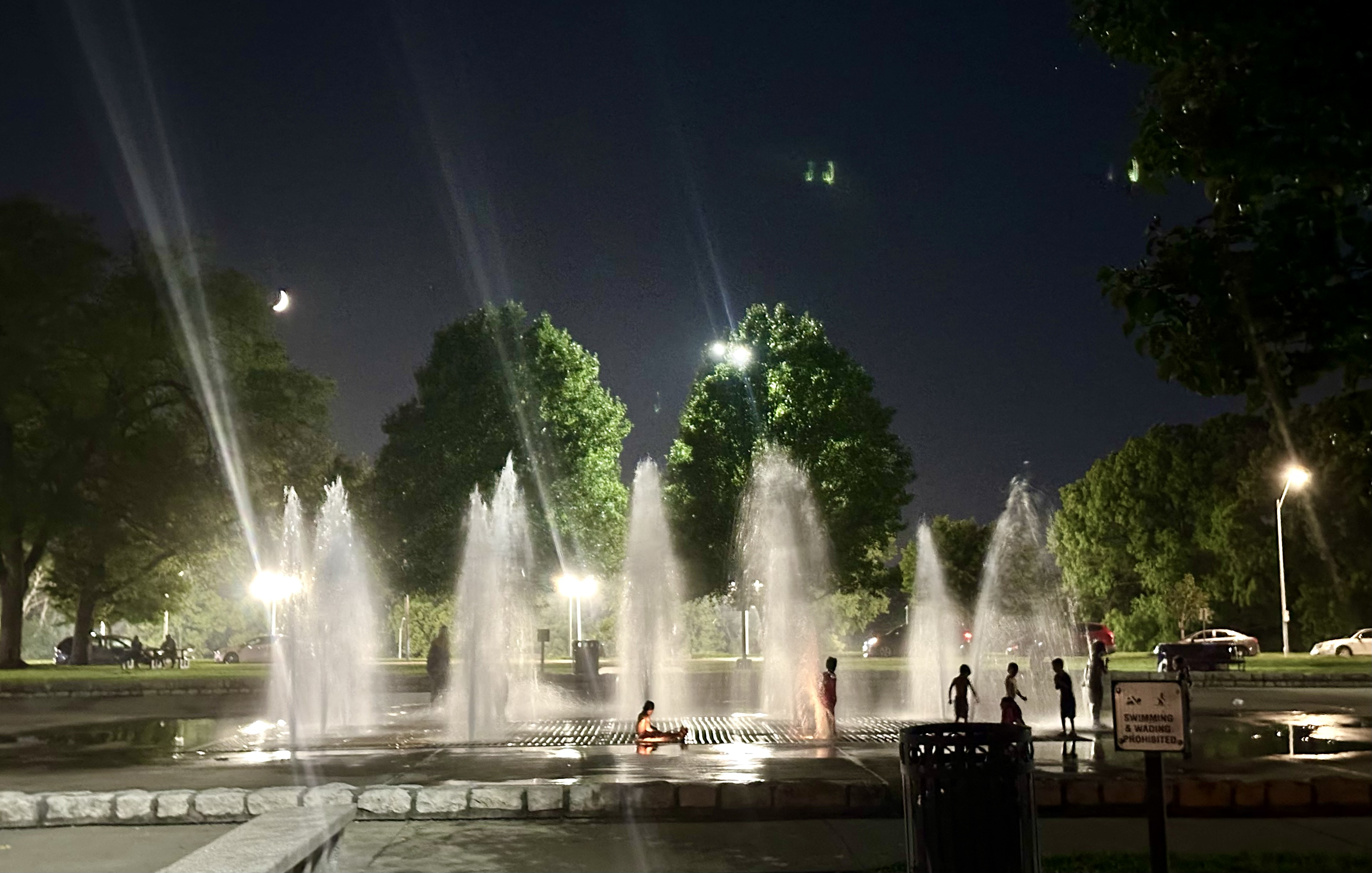
Children play in the Concourse fountains in July.

The park had significant changes through the 20th century. Between 1920 and 1921, the city constructed a massive 17 million US gallons (64×10^{6} L) water reservoir on a high point in the park. The project was an engineering failure; it began leaking almost immediately, causing chronic flooding, and was decommissioned and abandoned by 1931, leaving a vast concrete ruin. In 1962, the park's popular Cliff Drive Spring, which had been used by pioneers and the Scarritt family to cool milk and butter, was permanently capped after the water was deemed contaminated.

Like many American urban parks, Kessler endured a long period of decline in the latter half of the 20th century. Cliff Drive became a notorious spot for illegal dumping, its roadsides littered with trash and its pavement crumbling.

=== Community renewal and modern era (1980s–present) ===
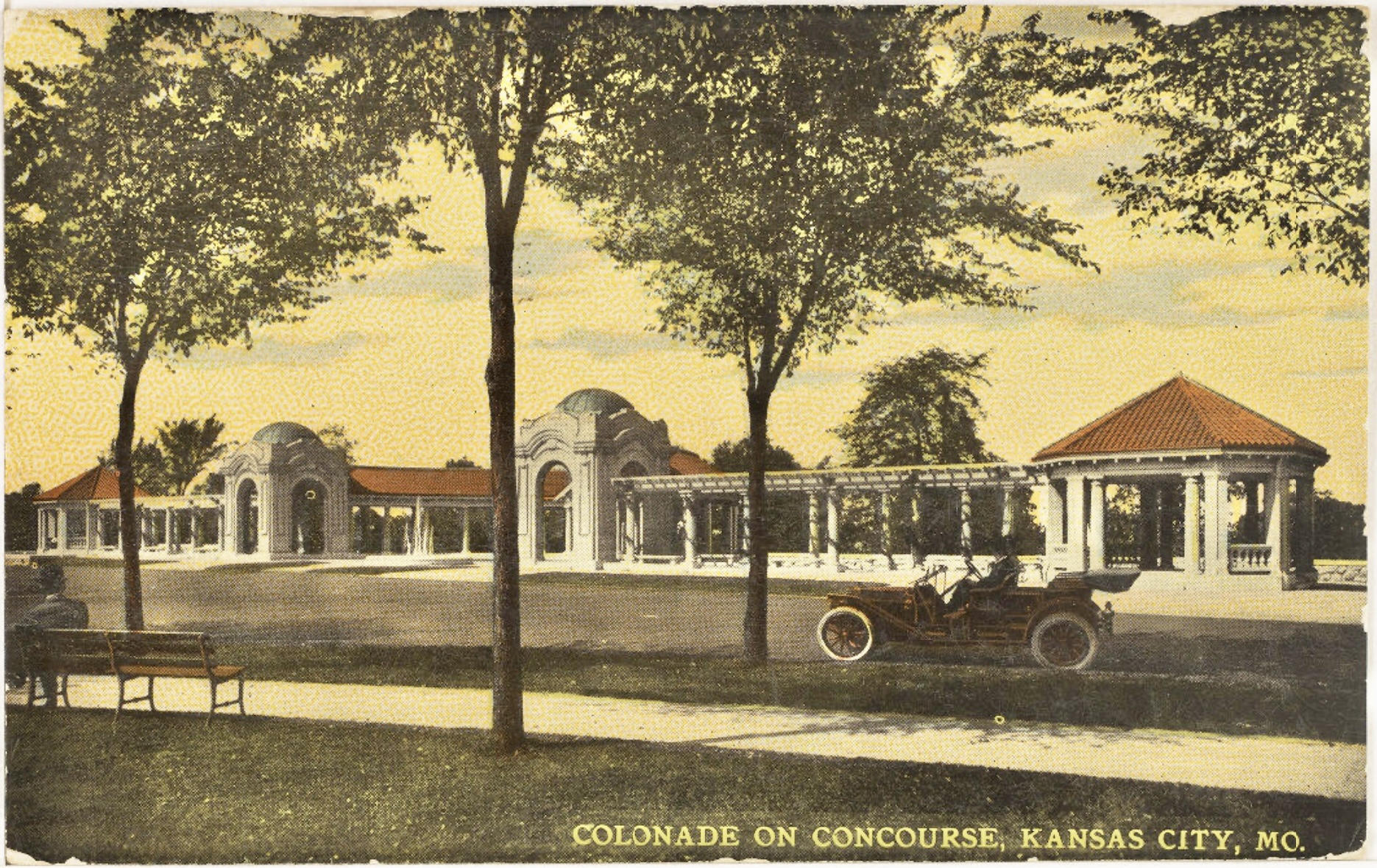
The neoclassical Colonnade in North Terrace Park (renamed Kessler Park) was designed by George Kessler and Henry Wright, with domed pavilions. A touring car is parked (postcard c. 1910).

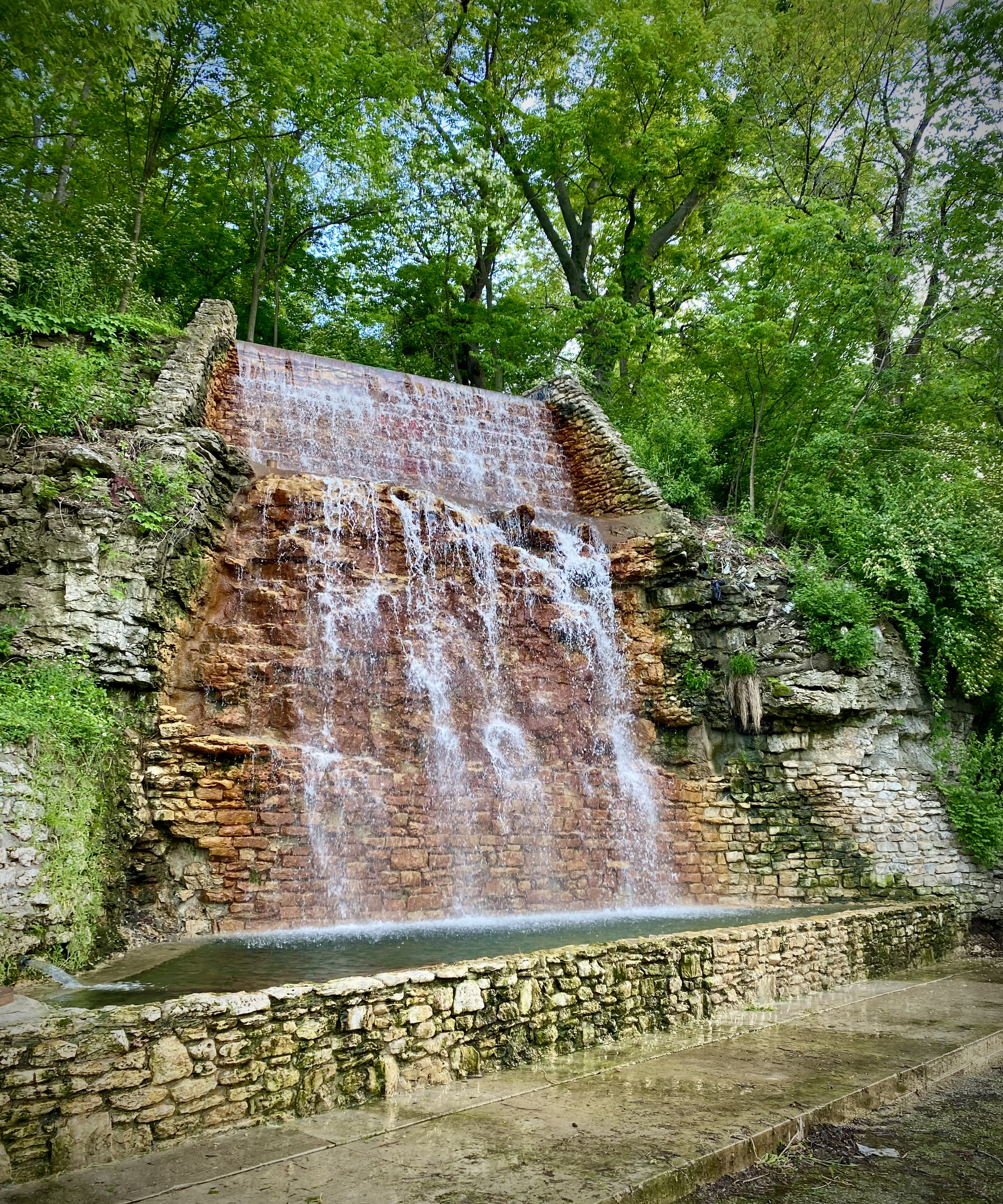
The Carl J. DiCapo Fountain was built 1989 on Cliff Drive to replace the natural Scarritt Spring.

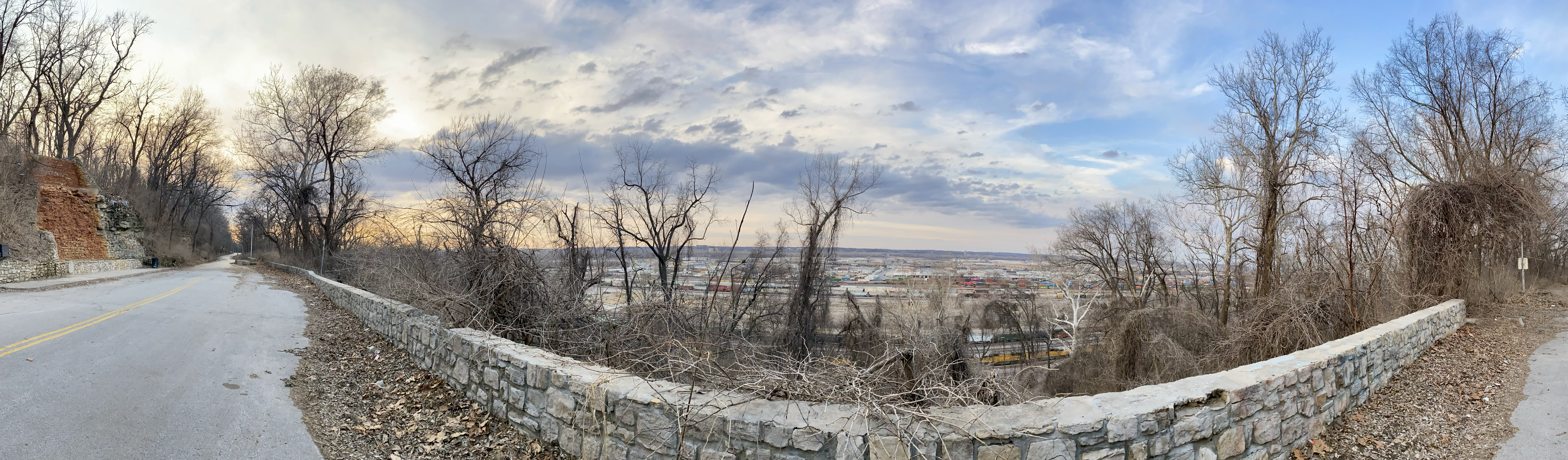
This view of the west and north is at the Carl J DiCapo Fountain along Cliff Drive, overlooks the Missouri River valley. The railroads and factories of Northeast Industrial District are in the East Bottoms below, then the Missouri River, then the Northland of Kansas City.

The park's modern era is defined by community-led efforts to reverse decades of neglect. The renewal began in the 1980s, when a task force of Northeast community leaders successfully lobbied for millions of dollars to restore Cliff Drive. This effort replaced the dry Scarritt Spring with a dramatic, 40-foot (12 m) artificial waterfall and reflecting pool, built in 1989 as the Carl J. DiCapo Fountain. The community has long adopted the formal Colonnade as its own grand "public living room" or "Kansas City's biggest front porch". It is the setting for the SummerDusk concert series, where neighbors gather on the lawn on warm evenings.

Jack Murphy, beginning at age 10 around 2018, was so dismayed by the trash and overgrowth around his beloved North Terrace Lake that he began a years-long campaign to fix it. Working with his mother and specialists from the University of Missouri Extension, he presented grant proposals, organized trash cleanup days, and successfully pushed for repairs.

This activism culminated in the Kessler Park Improvement Plan, a master plan completed in September 2023. Its creation had deep public engagement, with over 700 interactions at 60 different events to ensure the plan was shaped by the community. When the plan was approved without city funding for implementation, leaders from three surrounding neighborhoods formed the Kessler Park Conservancy in 2023, a non-profit organization to raise funds and put the plan into action.

Management of Kessler Park is a collaboration between the Kansas City Parks and Recreation Department and the Conservancy. Key partners include the Missouri Department of Conservation, the volunteer group Urban Trail Co., and Jerusalem Farm, a local non-profit that has provided a herd of goats for targeted grazing to remove invasive honeysuckle in a project known as Goat Local. The Conservancy has already built a new walking path, planted an orchard of over 50 fruit trees, and installed new sports courts in Maple Park, a section of Kessler. Like many large urban parks, Kessler still faces challenges, including crime and persistent illegal dumping. These problems have spurred new safety initiatives, such as installing gates to curb after-hours activity and major annual volunteer cleanup events.

== Features ==
=== Ecology ===
The Kansas City region is at the confluence of the Great Plains and Eastern Temperate Forests ecoregions. The forest clinging to the limestone bluffs contains native ferns, wild ginger, Solomon's seal, and numerous wildflowers. Conservation efforts focus on promoting "keystone" native plants that are disproportionately important to the ecosystem because they support large numbers of native caterpillars and specialist bees. The park's ecosystem is based on trees like the American plum and chokecherry, which each support over 300 caterpillar species, and herbaceous perennials like cliff goldenrod (Solidago drummondii) and smooth aster (Symphyotrichum laeve).

Kessler Bark is the park's biggest tree, a fast-growing Eastern Cottonwood (Populus deltoides) near Lookout Point and the Reservoir, which held the title of state champion for many years. The colossal tree had a trunk circumference of 344 inches (870 cm) and a diameter of more than 9 feet (2.7 m). It was later surpassed for the state title and became the second largest tree.

=== Landmarks ===
The Colonnade is a 1908 Beaux-Arts pavilion and the park's primary architectural landmark. In 1965, its original fountain was replaced by a memorial to President John F. Kennedy, complete with an eternal flame that has since been converted to a sustainable LED light.

Cliff Drive is a 4.5-mile (7.2 km) scenic byway established in 1900. Following a period of disrepair and a major landslide, community advocacy led to its restoration and reopening in 2001. It is closed to cars and preserved as a unique urban sanctuary for pedestrian and athletic access.

The Carl J. DiCapo Fountain is a 40-foot (12 m) artificial waterfall and reflecting pool built on the site of the former Cliff Drive Spring. It was dedicated in 1993 as a monument to the first major community-led restoration effort in the park.

The Northeast Reservoir is a massive, abandoned concrete basin built in 1921. Its ruins have become a graffiti canvas and a destination for urban explorers. The Kansas City Design Center has led studies to reimagine the space as a future public venue for art and performance.

=== Recreation ===
Kessler Park is a major regional destination for recreation. A 21-hole disc golf course was established in 2004 around the old reservoir, utilizing the park's significant elevation changes. An extensive network of natural-surface single-track trails for hiking and mountain biking crisscrosses the highlands. These trails were largely built and are maintained by the Urban Trail Co., a volunteer organization. In partnership with the local climbing gym RoKC, the parks department has established designated bouldering and top-rope areas on the limestone cliffs. The park has courts for volleyball and Sepak takraw, a kick volleyball game popular with the area's large Burmese community.

== See also ==
- National Register of Historic Places listings in Kansas City, Missouri
- Swope Park, the "Crown Jewel" of Kansas City parks
- Loose Park, the third largest park in Kansas City
