= Swope Memorial Golf Course =

Golf course in Kansas City, Missouri

- Interactive map of Swope Memorial Golf Course
- 39°00′06″N 94°31′00″W

Club information
- Location: Kansas City, Missouri
- Established: 1934
- Type: Public
- Tota holes: 18
- Tournaments: Kansas City Open Invitational (1949)
- Website: https://www.swopememorialgolfcourse.com
- Designed by: A. W. Tillinghast
- Par: 72
- Length: 6274 yards
- Course rating: 70.9
- Slope rating: 132

Swope Memorial Golf Course is the first public golf course built in Kansas City, it was originally constructed in 1915. It re-opened in 1934 with a complete re-design by World Golf Hall of Fame golf course architect A. W. Tillinghast. It hosted the 1949 Kansas City Open Invitational, a PGA Tour event at the time and is the only golf course in the Kansas City area to have done so.

After years of neglect, in the early 1990's the course was renovated with many of the Tillinghast features removed in an attempt to "modernize" the course.

In 2005 it hosted the USGA Women's Amateur Public Links Championship.

It is currently closed and going through a sympathetic renovation. The Kansas City Parks Department has hired Todd Clark of CE Golf Design to lead this effort. He is working closely with Ron Whitten, emeritus writer of Architecture for Golf Digest and a respected expert on historic golf architects. The renovation will include greens, tee boxes, bunkers, irrigation, cart paths, tree pruning and removal and a new irrigation pond. The course is planning to re-open in Spring of 2026. The course construction is contracted to Mid-America Golf and Landscape, Inc.

The renovation is intended to restore the course to a design that closely reflects Tillinghast's original plans, based on historic photographs, drawings, and other historical sources. Following the renovation, it is expected to remain the only public Tillinghast-designed golf course in the United States that retains all of its original holes and routing. Other public Tillinghast courses have lost original holes because of development and highway construction. Tillinghast served as a consultant on the Bethpage Park golf courses.

In 1953 Swope hosted the United Golf Association (UGA) National Championship, in which Ann Gregory and Charlie Sifford won the women's and men's divisions, respectively.

== Course layout ==
Tee	Rating/Slope	1	2	3	4	5	6	7	8	9	Out	10	11	12	13	14	15	16	17	18	In	Total
Yardage	N/A	372	317	267	368	451	172	330	167	477	2,921	384	361	504	235	416	349	134	566	404	3,353	6,274
Par	N/A	4	4	4	4	5	3	4	3	5	36	4	4	5	3	4	4	3	5	4	36	72
