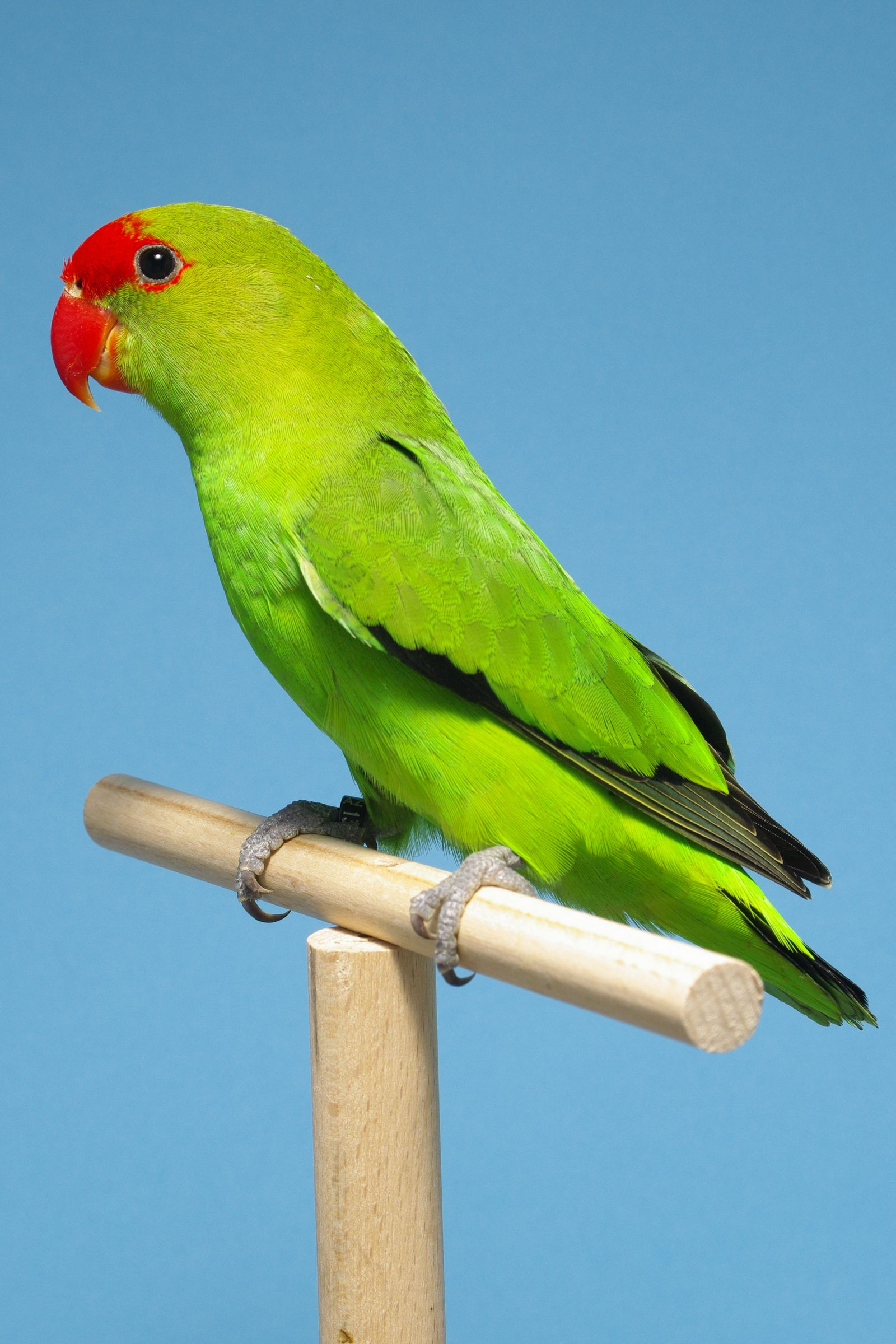
- Male

Conservation status
- Least Concern (IUCN 3.1)
- CITES Appendix II (CITES)

Scientific classification
- Kingdom: Animalia
- Phylum: Chordata
- Class: Aves
- Order: Psittaciformes
- Family: Psittaculidae
- Genus: Agapornis
- Species: A. taranta

Binomial name
- Agapornis taranta (Stanley, 1814)

= Black-winged lovebird =

Species of bird

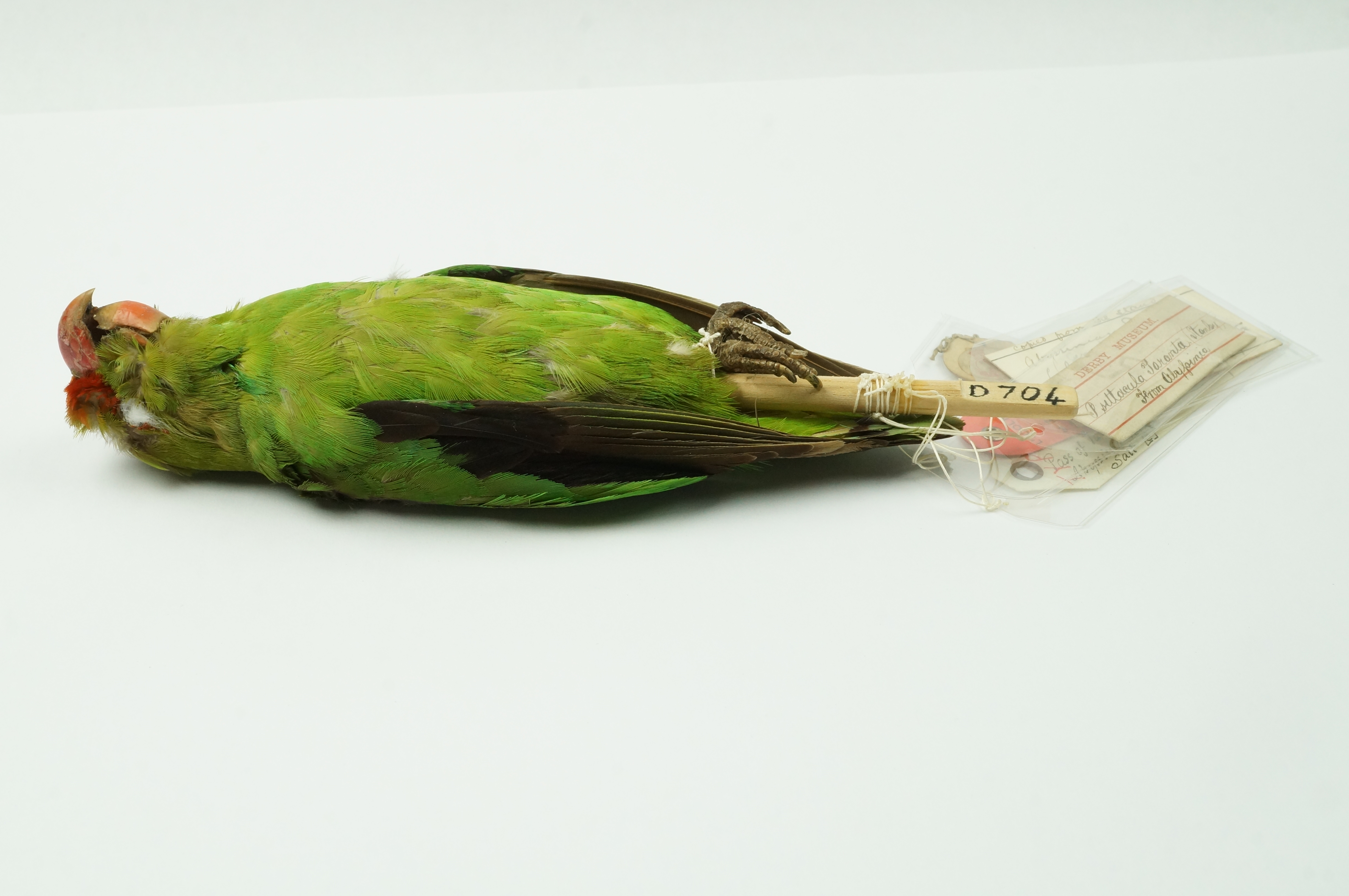
Holotype of Psittacus taranta Stanley (NML-VZ D704) held at World Museum, National Museums Liverpool

The black-winged lovebird (Agapornis taranta) also known as Abyssinian lovebird is a mainly green bird of the parrot family. At about 16.5 cm (6.5 inches) long, it is the largest of the lovebird genus, a group of small parrots. The adult male is easily identified by its red forehead, and the adult female by its all-green head. They are native to Eritrea and Ethiopia, and they are uncommon as pets.

== Description ==
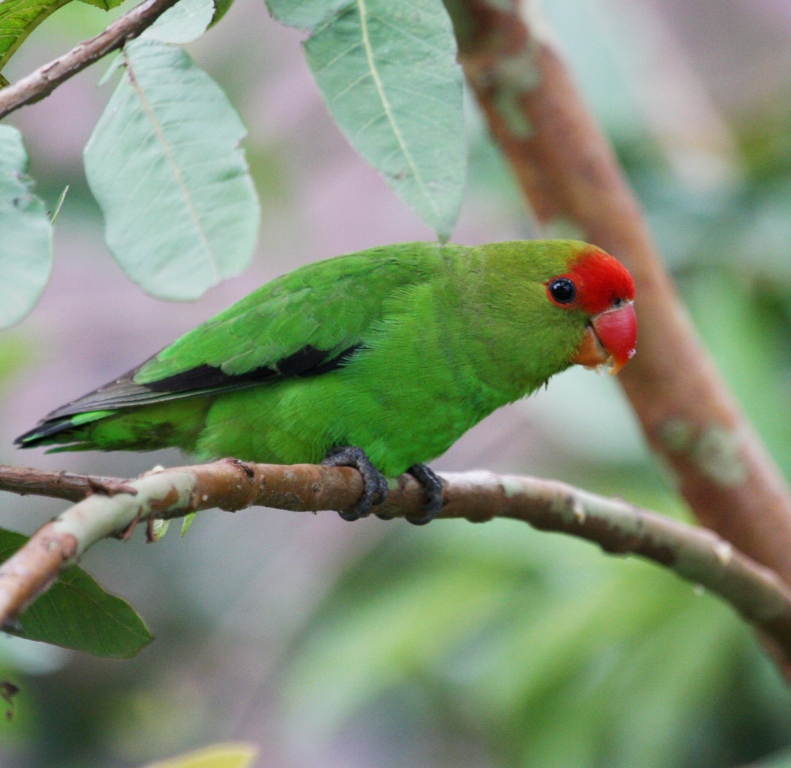
Male in Bahir Dar, Ethiopia

The black-winged lovebird, with a length of about 16–16.5 cm (6.3–6.5 inches), is the largest species of lovebird. It is sexually dimorphic, as are the red-headed lovebird and grey-headed lovebird. The dimorphism becomes apparent in juvenile birds after their first molt at about eight or nine months of age. Both the male and female black-winged lovebird are mostly green, and only the adult male black-winged lovebird has a red forehead and a ring of red feathers around its eyes.

The tail is black tipped and feathers below the tail show a yellowish colour. The rump and feathers above the tail are light green. In the male, feathers under the wing are typically black, and in the female the feathers under the wing are typically greenish or brownish black. Both sexes have a red beak and gray feet.

== Habitat ==
The natural distribution for the black-winged lovebird is typically from southern Eritrea to southwestern Ethiopia, and they normally live in either high plains or mountainous regions.

== Behavior ==
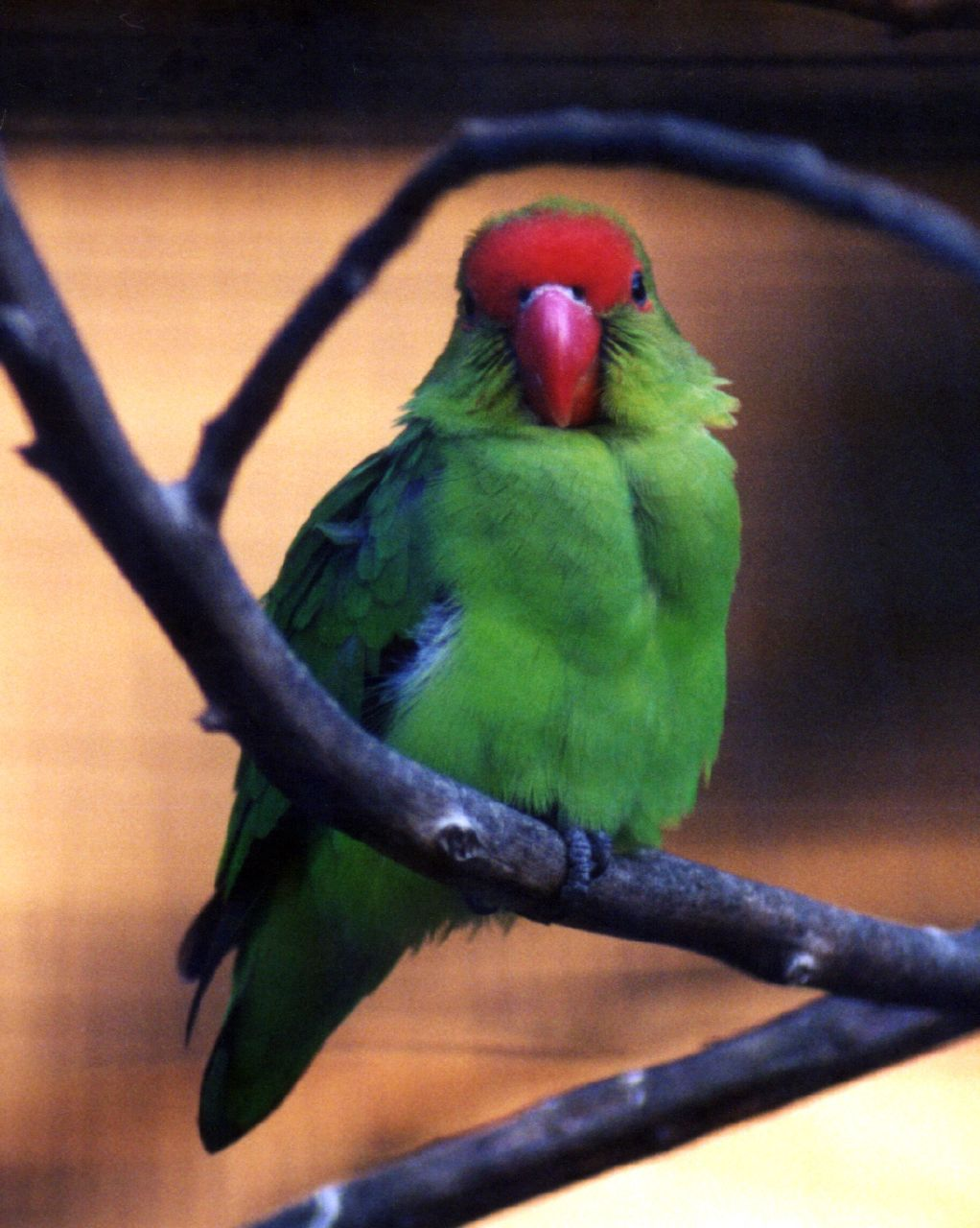
Male at San Diego Zoo, USA

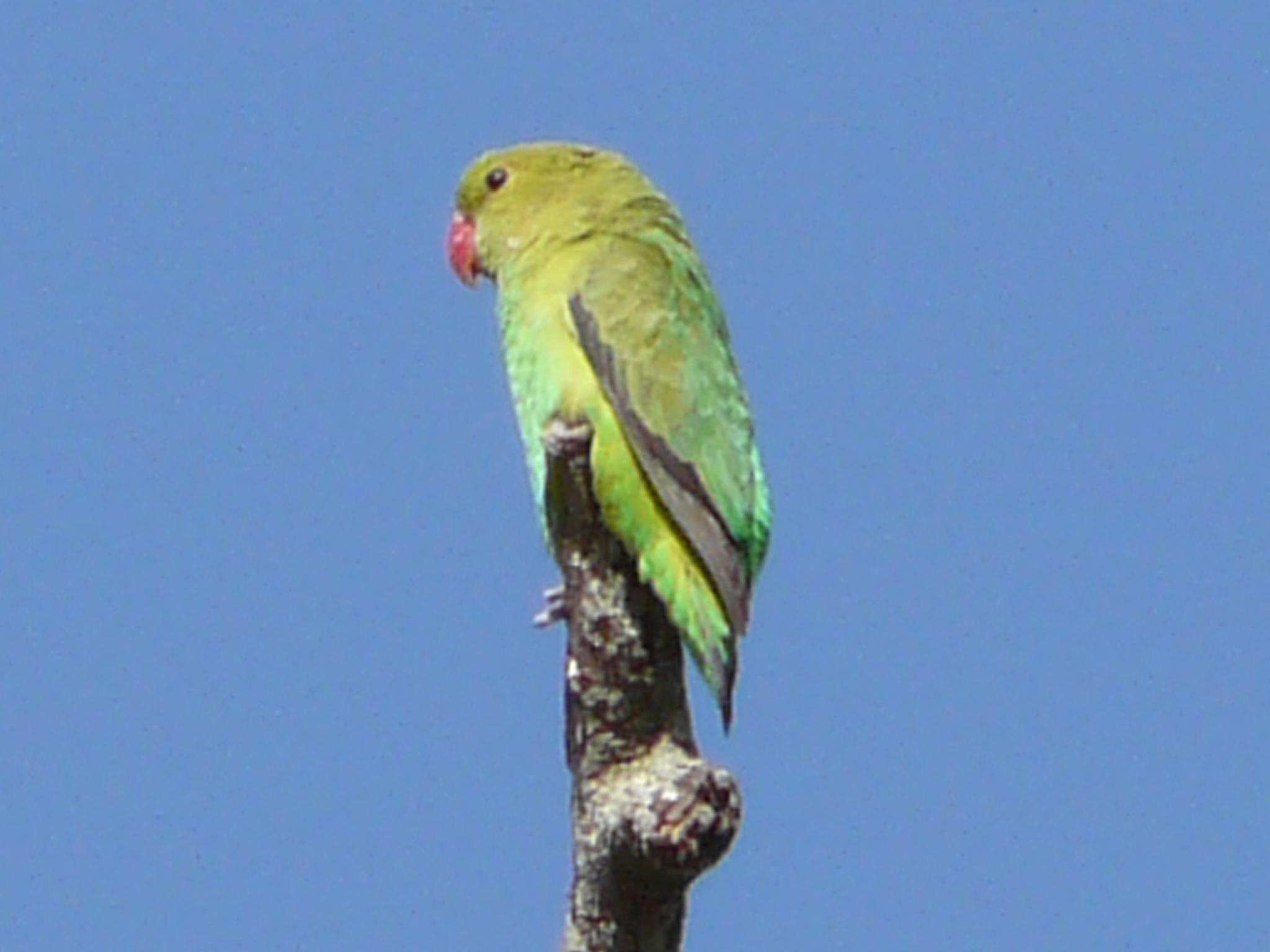
Female in Ethiopia

=== Food and feeding ===
Sunflower seeds, corn, apples and mission figs are typical of an Abyssinian lovebird diet.

=== Breeding ===
The black-winged lovebird nests in a tree cavity. The eggs are white and there are usually three or four eggs in a clutch. The female incubates the eggs for 23 days, and the chicks fledge from the nest about 45 days after hatching.

Black-winged lovebirds reproduce from March to November; nesting takes place in tree hollows, crevices in walls, and potentially in weavers' nests. The nests are furnished with a combination of plant debris and feathers.

== Status ==
Widespread and common throughout its range, the black-winged lovebird is evaluated as Least Concern on the IUCN Red List of Threatened Species.

== Aviculture ==
In aviculture the black-winged lovebird has not become well established as a breeding bird, although it can tolerate cold weather. Breeding in aviculture is on a small scale, so it is an uncommon pet.

== Taxonomy ==
A holotype of Psittacus taranta Stanley (Salt's Voy. to Abyssinia, 1814, App IV, p.lii(=52)), an adult male, is held in the vertebrate zoology collection of National Museums Liverpool at World Museum, with accession number NML-VZ D704. The specimen was collected in Taranta Pass, Acchele Guzai District, Eritrea in 1809-10 by Henry Salt. The specimen came to the Liverpool national collection via the 13th Earl of Derby's collection, which was bequeathed to the people of Liverpool in 1851.
