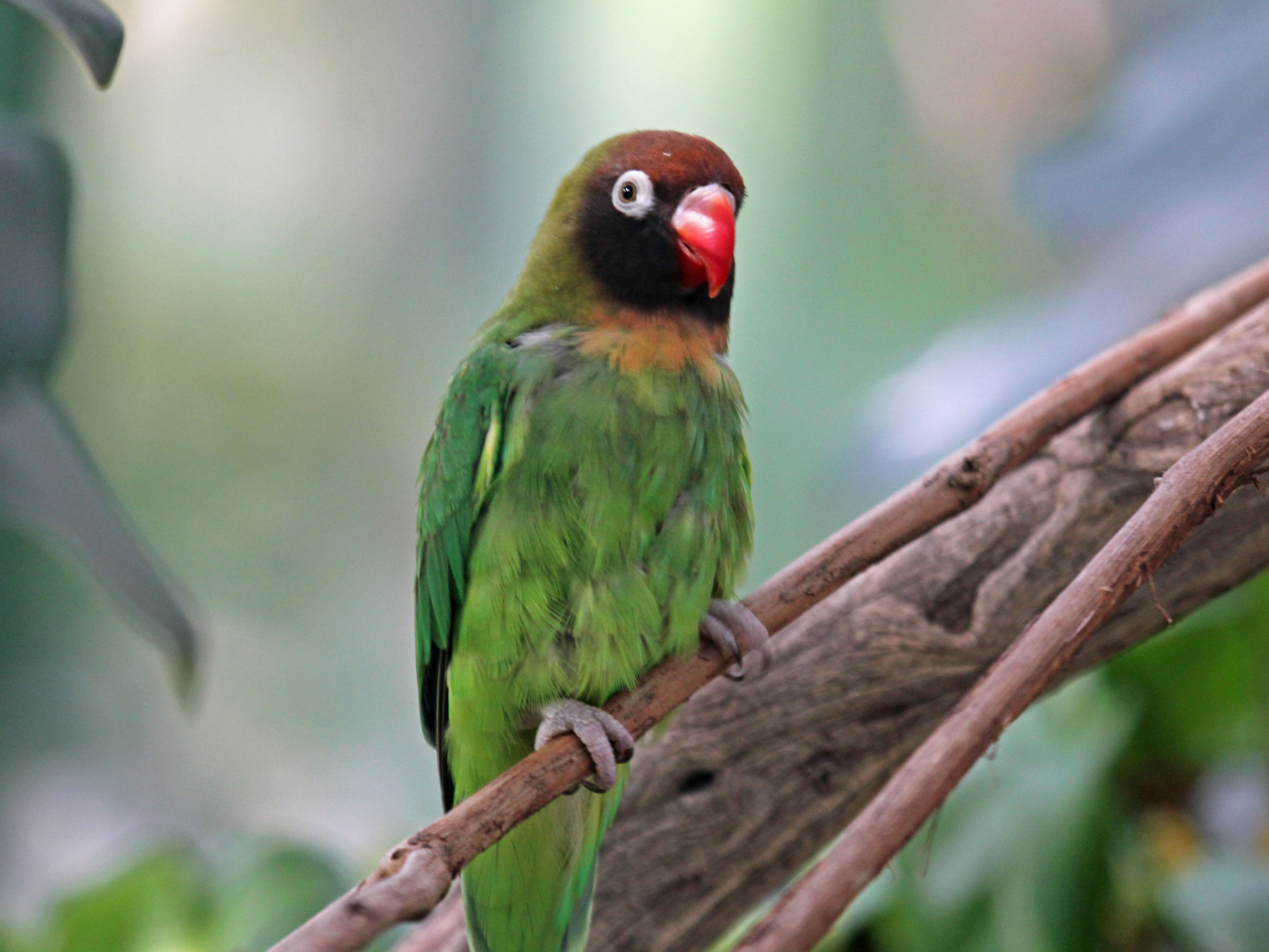

Conservation status
- Vulnerable (IUCN 3.1)
- CITES Appendix II

Scientific classification
- Kingdom: Animalia
- Phylum: Chordata
- Class: Aves
- Order: Psittaciformes
- Family: Psittaculidae
- Genus: Agapornis
- Species: A. nigrigenis

Binomial name
- Agapornis nigrigenis Sclater, WL, 1906
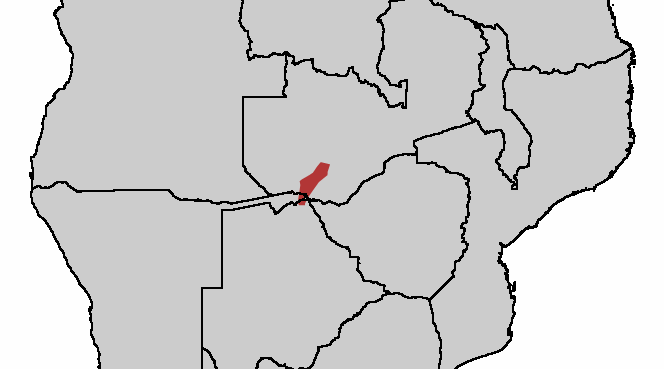
- Distribution of the black-cheeked lovebird

= Black-cheeked lovebird =

Species of bird

The black-cheeked lovebird (Agapornis nigrigenis) is a small parrot species of the lovebird genus. It is mainly green and has a brown head, red beak, and white eyerings. It is endemic to a relatively small range in southwest Zambia, where it is vulnerable to habitat loss.

== Taxonomy ==
The black-cheeked lovebird is monotypic. The black-cheeked lovebird is sometimes seen as a race of Lilian's lovebird.

== Description ==
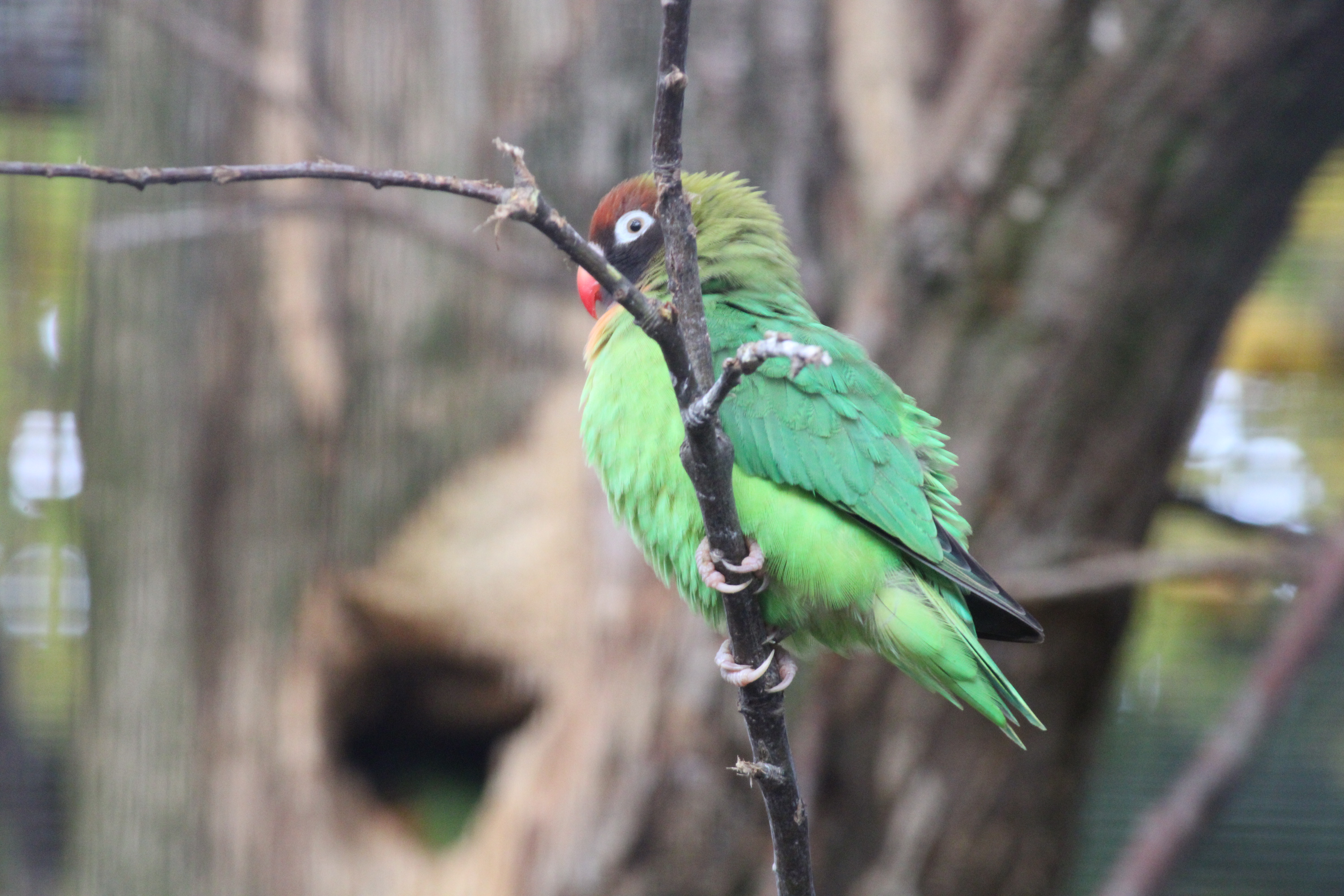
At Copenhagen Zoo

The black-cheeked lovebird is 14 cm (5.5 in) in length, with mostly green plumage, reddish-brown forehead and forecrown, brownish-black cheeks and throat, orange bib below the throat which fades to yellowish-green, white eye-rings and grey feet. Adult have bright red beaks, while juveniles of the species are similar but with a more orange bill. Vocalizations are loud, piercing shrieks, which sound like the calls of other lovebirds.

== Distribution and habitat ==
The black-cheeked lovebird inhabits deciduous woodland, where permanent supplies of surface water exist, as it needs daily access to water. In the dry season, these birds may congregate in large flocks of up to 800 or more. They are found in Zambia and may occur in Zimbabwe, Botswana and Namibia.

== Conservation ==
It is listed as a vulnerable species as its population is in decline due to continuous habitat loss. This is due to gradual desiccation of water bodies, causing drought, farming practices, hunting and trapping, fishing, logging and diseases. There are currently only between 2,500 and 9,999 mature individuals. However, they occur in nature reserves and there is an action plan in place to help them.

== Diet ==
The black-cheeked lovebird feeds mainly at ground-level on annual grass seeds, but also on other vegetable matter and insect larvae, and on corn, sorghum, and millet.

== Aviculture ==
The black-cheeked lovebird is relatively easy to breed in aviculture, but there was little interest in breeding them during the first half of the twentieth century at a time when imports were numerous. Now they are uncommon in aviculture and uncommon as pets.
