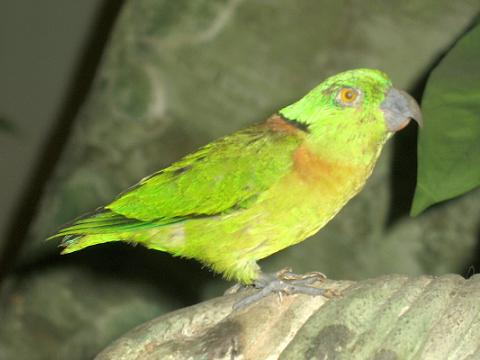

Conservation status
- Least Concern (IUCN 3.1)
- CITES Appendix II

Scientific classification
- Kingdom: Animalia
- Phylum: Chordata
- Class: Aves
- Order: Psittaciformes
- Family: Psittaculidae
- Genus: Agapornis
- Species: A. swindernianus

Binomial name
- Agapornis swindernianus (Kuhl, 1820)
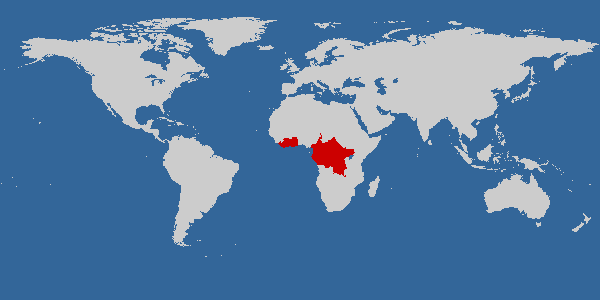
- Range map

= Black-collared lovebird =

Species of bird

The black-collared lovebird (Agapornis swindernianus) also known as Swindern's lovebird is a small, 13.5 cm (5 inch) long, African parrot in the genus Agapornis and belongs to the Agapornithinae subfamily. The black-collared lovebird is widespread across the African tropical closed rainforest. It is a mostly green parrot with black band on the back of its neck, and a dark greyish-black bill. Both sexes are similar. It is rarely kept in captivity because of its dietary requirement for a native fig.

== Description ==
It is a mostly green parrot with black-collared nape, brownish red chest, greyish black bill, yellow iris and grey feet. Both sexes are similar. More specifically, the head is mostly green, with a yellow neck and a narrow black hind collar. Its bottom is a royal dark blue, and the rest of its upper body is dark green. The Agapornis swindernianus has soft black feathers and orange-red markings on its outer tail feathers. The two sexes are similar in their coloring. The young birds do not have the distinct black collar. The Dutch professor Theodore van Swinderen from the University of Groningen named the black-collared lovebird in 1820. The bird gets its name from the 'collar', identifiable from black feathers around its neck that resembles a collared shape. The zenkeri extension of the species contains a blood-orange stripe underneath its distinct collar.

== Taxonomy ==
There are three subspecies of the black-collared lovebird:

- The nominate subspecies, A. s. swindernianus – Liberia, Côte d'Ivoire and Ghana
- Cameroon black-collared lovebird, A. s. zenkeri – Cameroon, Gabon and Congo
- Ituri black-collared lovebird or Emin's lovebird, A. s. emini – Democratic Republic of the Congo and Uganda.

The black-collared lovebird was discovered by Heinrich Kuhl in 1820. The name commemorates the Dutch professor, Theodore van Swinderen of University of Groningen.

== Distribution and habitat ==
The black-collared lovebird is distributed across a wide range in African tropical closed rainforest. It inhabits the forests of Cameroon, Central African Republic, the Republic of Congo, the Democratic Republic of Congo, Côte d'Ivoire, Equatorial Guinea, Gabon, Ghana, Liberia and Uganda. They hide high in the forest canopy and are characterized as being very shy.The black-collared lovebird lives mainly in mature and secondary subtropic lowlands. These birds prefer a close-to-sea-level environment where they are not met with mountains or hills. They also enjoy gallery forests, or an environment of trees along a body of water. The black-collared lovebirds particularly favor fig trees and areas cleared of brush. Found commonly in primary forest trees or rarely in secondary growth, depending on the foliage level.

== Diet and foraging ==
The Agapornis swindernianus diet relies on fig seeds, African fruits Rauwolfia, Harungana, and Macaranga, and maize from the forest ground. They are known to forage for oil palm at dawn in small flocks and feed on seeds and berries; insects, including caterpillars and beetle larvae. Although the Agapornis swindernianus will feed on food found on the ground level they are mostly spotted in tree tops above the canopies making them very difficult birds to spot.

== Vocal behavior ==
The vocal behavior of the Agapornis swindernianus has not been adequately recorded. There is not an exact pitch or sound that has been pinned to the bird. The most common voice is a high-pitched, discordant "sri-lee". The bird makes a variety of chattering noises when perched. Big groups of birds tweet constantly.

== Conservation status ==
The black-collared lovebird is not globally threatened, although it is generally reported as rare or uncommon, with an exception being in Gabon; this might reflect the common observer activity and the sensitization to the black-collared lovebird. The bird is rare in Liberia, but still not of concern. The black-collared lovebird is also not uncommon in the Yapo Forest in the Ivory Coast. In that country, the bird was also recorded in Azagny National Park and Taï National Parks. In Ghana, the species is rare and likely now confined to forest reserves, as well as in Bia National Park. The species is rare in the Central African Republic, where they live in the Dzanga-Sangha Special Reserve. The Agapornis swindernianus has rarely been recorded in East Africa in general, but is reasonably common in Semuliki National Park, Uganda.

== Status ==
It is rare in some parts of its range. The range is so large that the population is difficult to estimate, but it is believed that the population is not under significant threat. The black-collared lovebird is evaluated as Least Concern on the IUCN Red List of Threatened Species.

== Aviculture ==
Black-collared lovebirds are rarely kept in captivity or as pets. They require certain native fig seed or fig flesh as a basis of their daily diet, and without these vital dietary necessities they do not normally thrive or breed well in captivity.
