= Bia National Park =

National park in Ghana

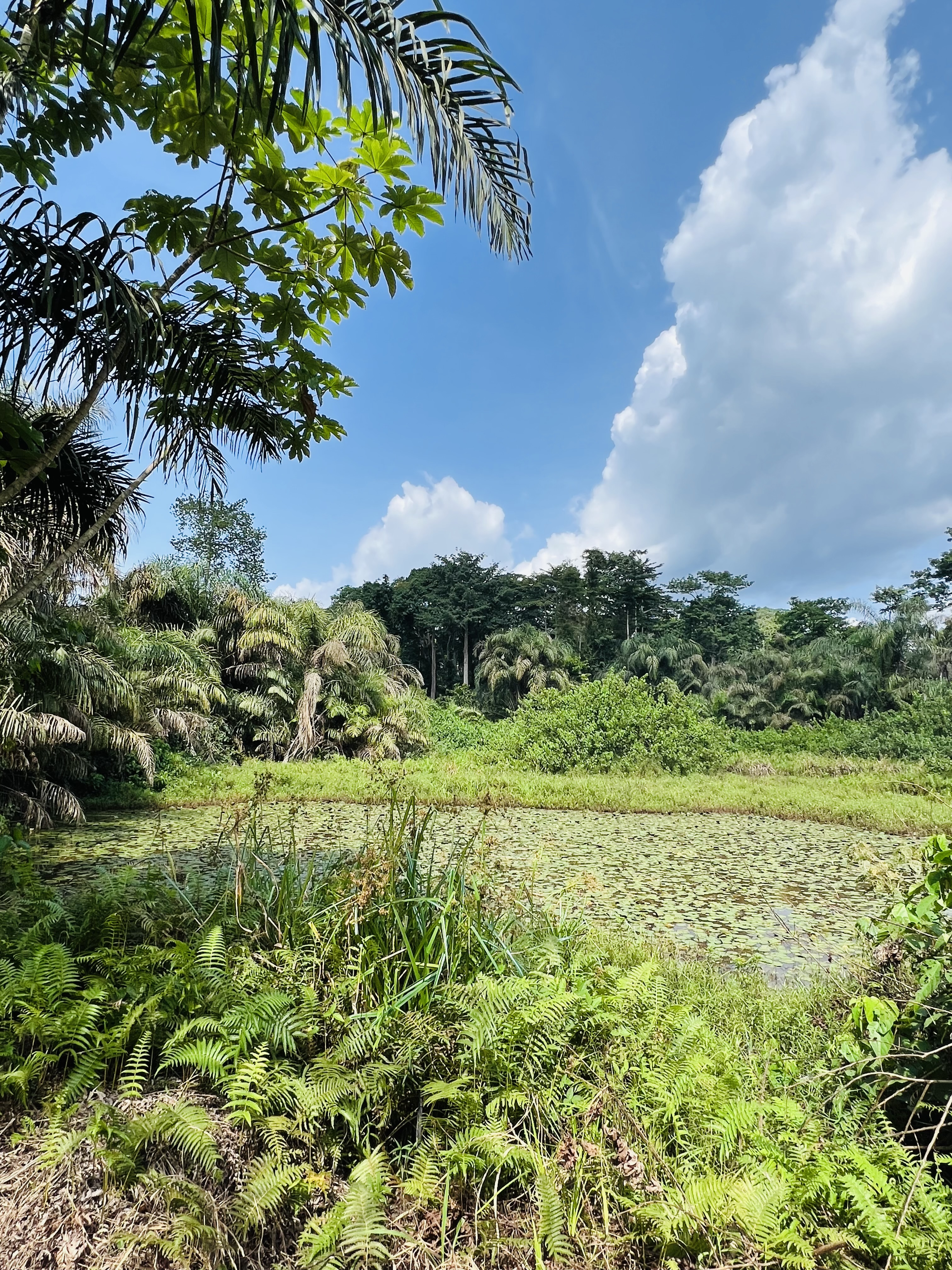

- Location within Ghana
- Location: Western North Region of Ghana
- Nearest city: Sekondi-Takoradi
- Coordinates: 6°5′N 3°6′W
- Area: 563 km^{2} (217 sq mi)
- Established: 1974

Bia National Park is a national park in the Bia West district in the Western North Region of Ghana. It is also a biosphere reserve with a 563 square kilometer resource reserve. It has some of Ghana's last remnants of relatively untouched forest complete with its full diversity of wildlife. Some of the tallest trees left in West Africa are found in this national park. It constitutes a twin conservation area called the Bia National Park and the Bia Resource Reserve.

== History ==
Bia was created in 1935 and named after the Bia River which drains the area. It became an official national park in 1974. Intensive farming destroyed much of the original vegetation in the park. However, since 1975, no human activities like farming or logging have taken place. In 1985 the park was named a biosphere reserve and a UNESCO world heritage site.

== Geography ==
Bia National Park is located near the Ivorian border, the Bia River, and its tributaries flow into the Ivorian drainage area. It is found in the transitional zone between moist-evergreen and moist semi-deciduous forest types. Access to the park from Kumasi is through Bibiani, Sefwi Wiawso to Sefwi Asempanaye or Goaso through Sankore to Sefwi Asempanaye. From Sunyani, it can be reached through Berekum, Wanfi, Adabokrom and Debiso. From Ivory Coast the park can be reached through Osei Kojokrom and Debiso.

=== Wildlife ===
There are about 62 species of mammals (including 10 primate species which are the Black-and-White colobus, the olive colobus, red colobus monkeys and chimpanzees) known to live in the park, and over 189 bird species, including the endangered white-breasted guinea fowl, black-collared lovebird, Cassin's hawk-eagle, honeyguide greenbul, black-headed oriole, brown and Puvel's illadopsis, Finsch's flycatcher-thrush, grey-headed negrofinch, western nicator, spotted greenbul, grey-headed bristlebill, fire-bellied woodpecker and melancholy woodpecker). The park has been designated an Important Bird Area (IBA) by BirdLife International because it supports significant populations of many bird species. The park is also the only known home of the newly discovered species of lizard, Agama africana. Ghana's major protected forest antelope communities also live in the park. The forest elephant and the bongo which is claimed to be highly threatened can be found there.

=== Climate ===
The area receives an average yearly rainfall of between 1500 mm and 1800 mm. Relative humidity levels can rise to about 90% at night and drop to around 75% in the afternoon. Average monthly temperatures typically vary from 24°C to 28°C.

== Activities ==
Walking trails and road to the Park reserve of the forest, where wild animals and birds can be spotted. Ecological studies and snail picking are also undertaken in the reserve. A cultural site called Apaso located in the park close to two small pools is claimed to be a sacred place for visitors to sacrifice and give gifts to the gods.

== Gallery ==
Images from Bia National Park
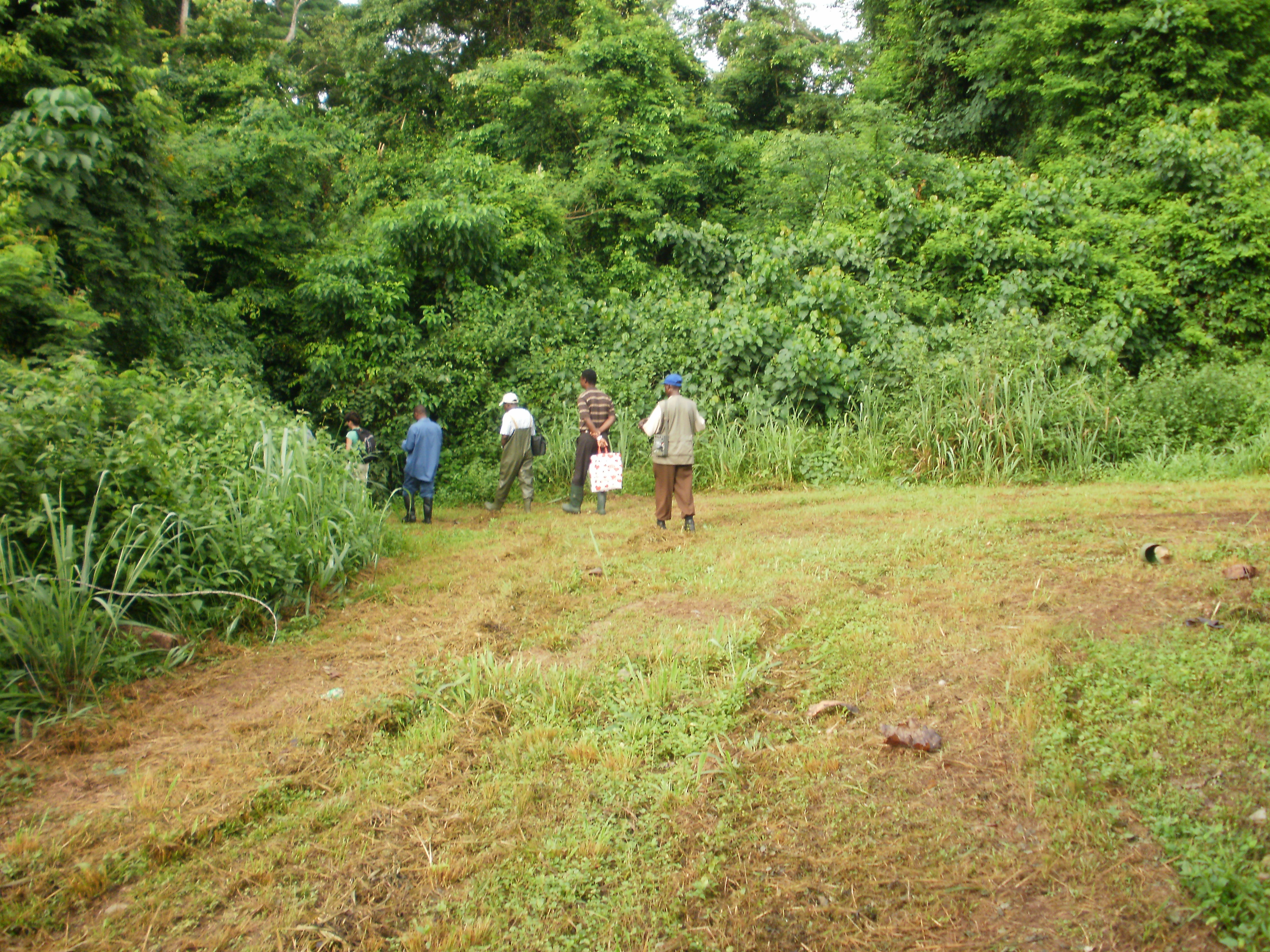
Entrance to Bia Forest reserve

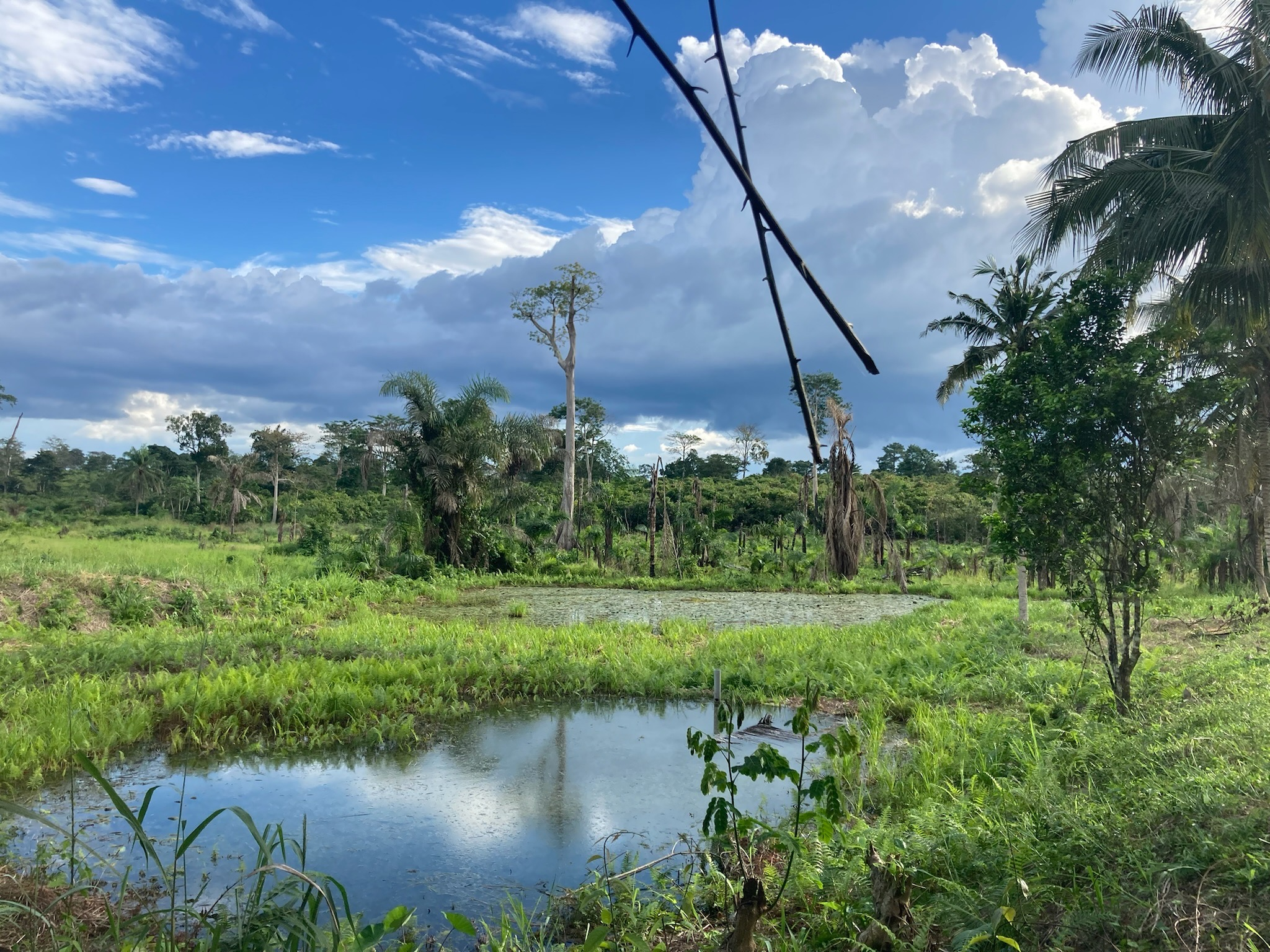
Bia National Park

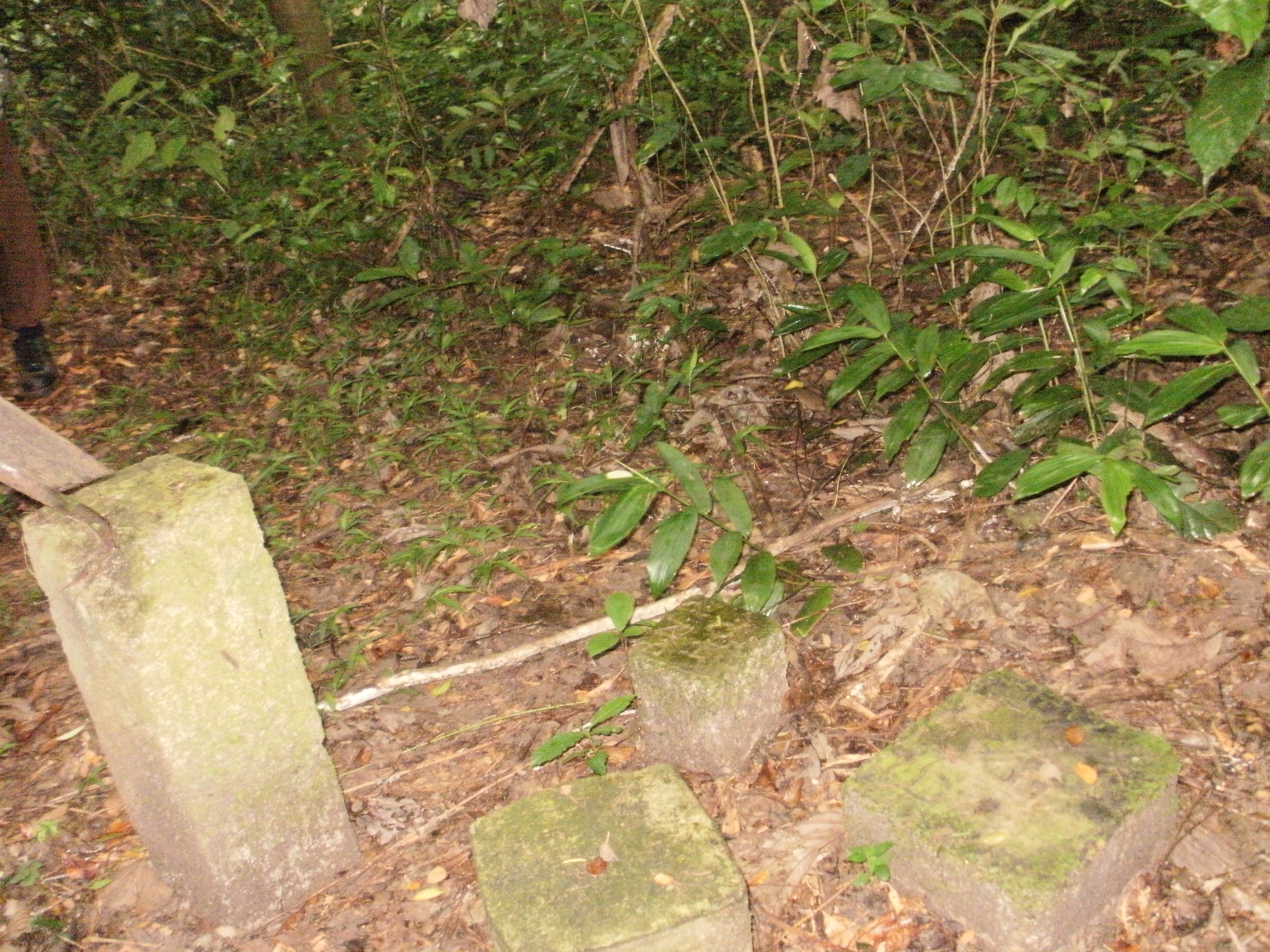
Boundary Pillars

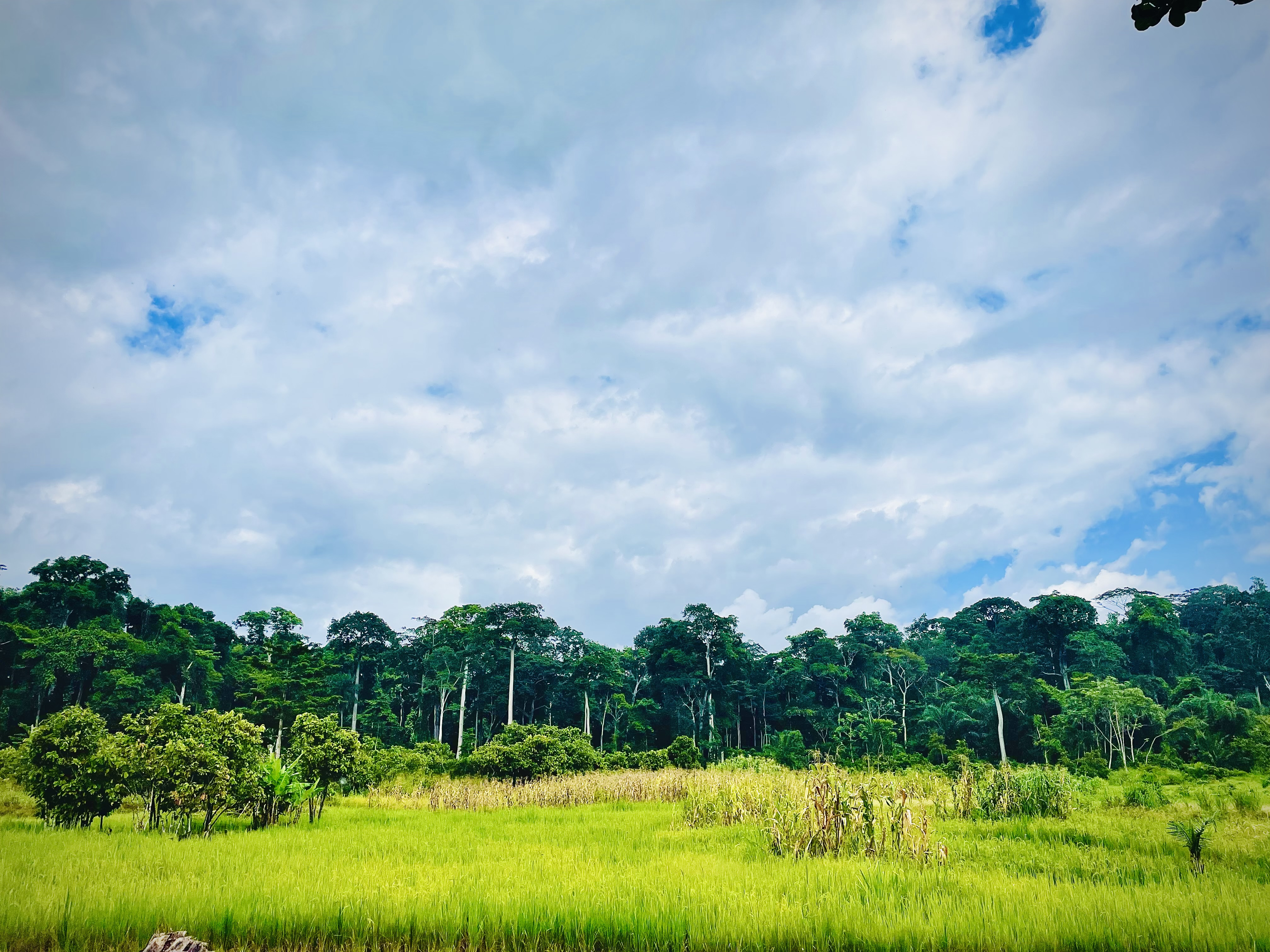
A rice farm at Bia National Park

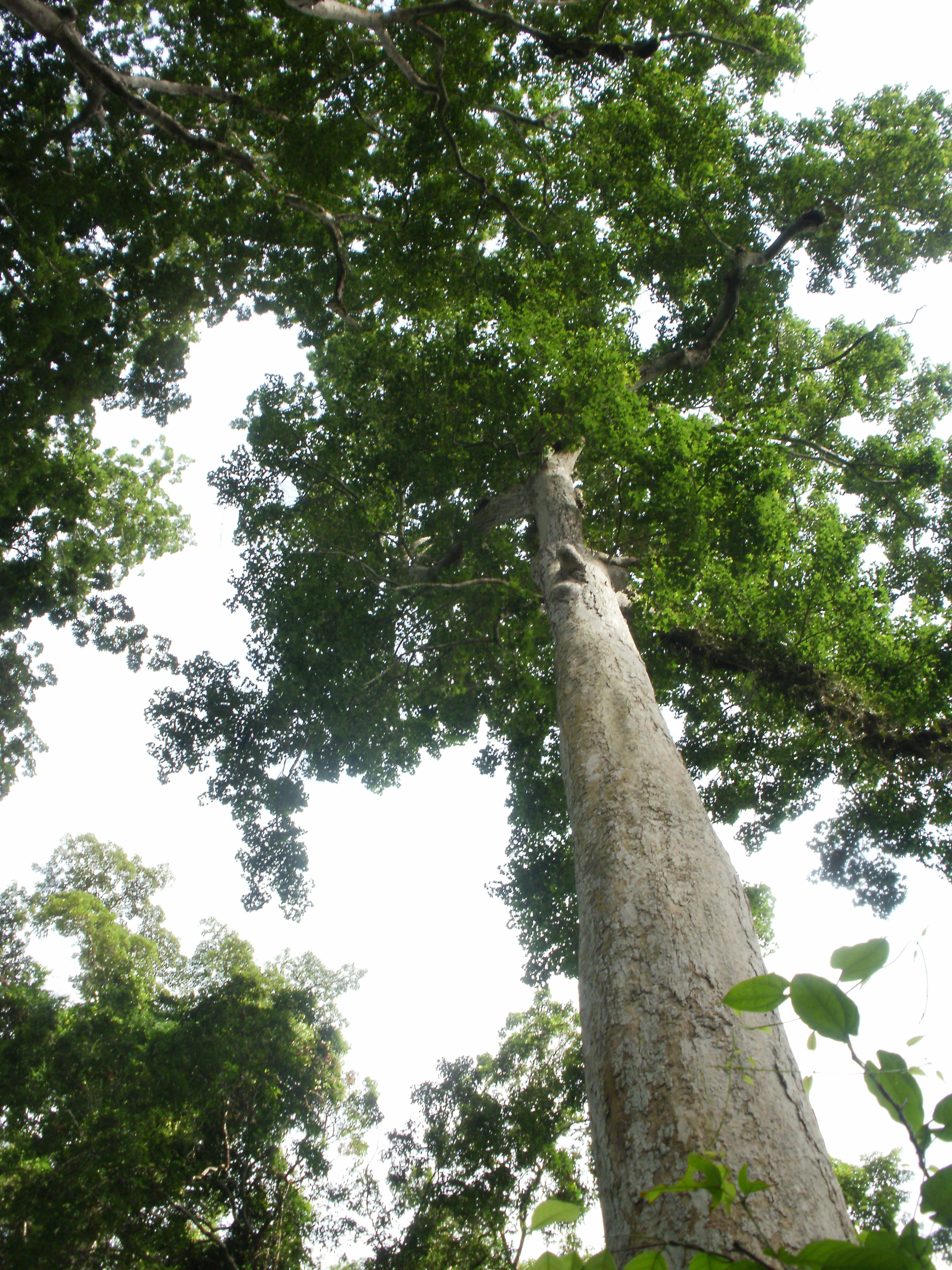
Trees in Bia Forest

== Bibliography ==
Notes

References

- Boyle, Timothy James Butler; Boontawee, B. (1995). Measuring and monitoring biodiversity in tropical and temperate forests: proceedings of a IUFRO symposium held at Chiang Mai, Thailand, August 27th — September 2nd, 1994 (1995 ed.). CIFOR. ISBN 979-8764-01-3. - Total pages: 395
- East, Rod;(IUCN/SSC Specialist Antelope Group) (1990). Antelopes: Global Survey and Regional Action Plans Part 3. West and Central Africa (1990 ed.). IUCN. ISBN 2-8317-0016-7. - Total pages: 171
