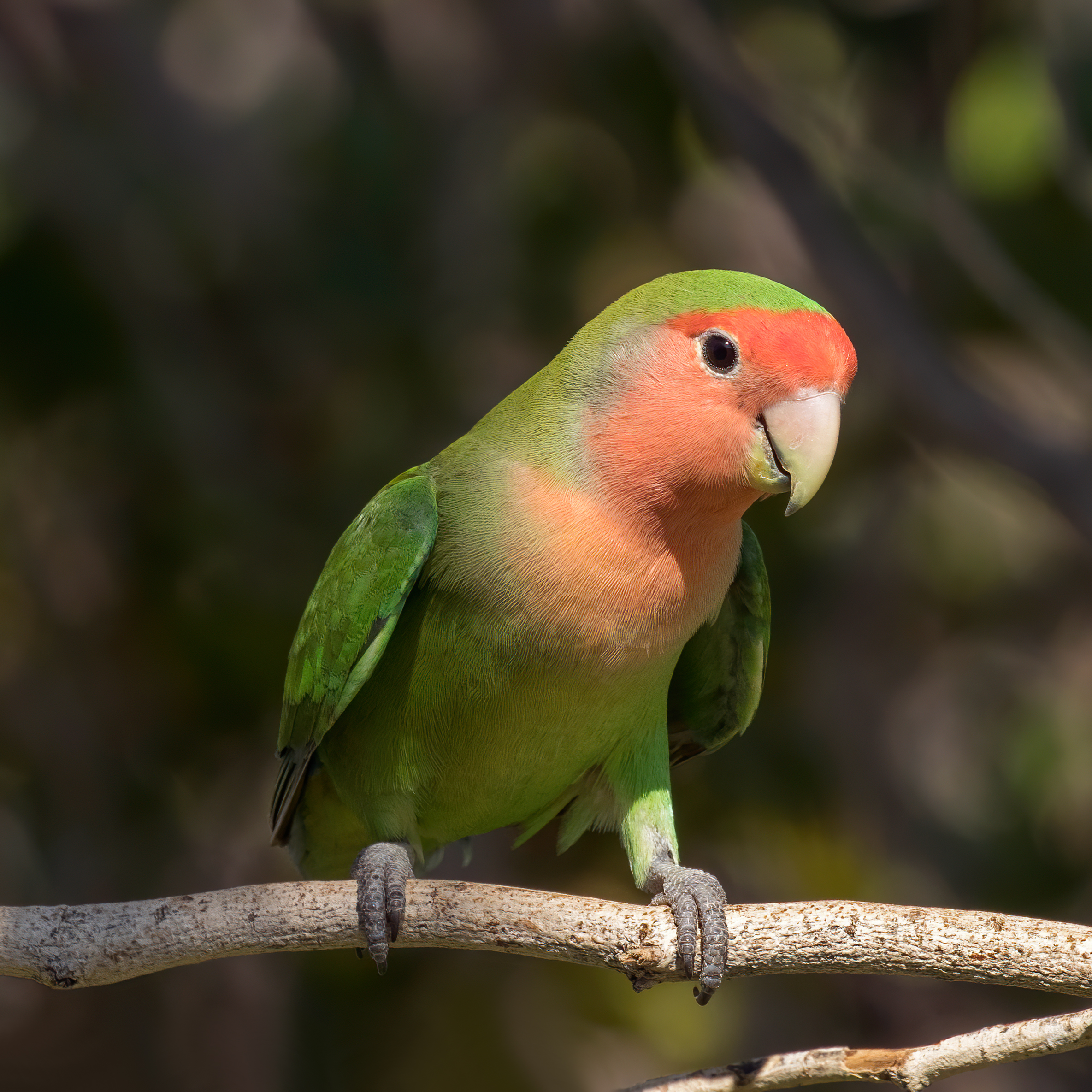
- A rosy-faced lovebird in Namibia

Scientific classification
- Kingdom: Animalia
- Phylum: Chordata
- Class: Aves
- Order: Psittaciformes
- Family: Psittaculidae
- Subfamily: Agapornithinae
- Genus: Agapornis; Selby, 1836

Type species
- Psittacus swindernianus (black-collared lovebird) Kuhl, 1820

Species
- Nine - see text

= Lovebird =

Genus of parrots

Lovebird is the common name for the genus Agapornis, a small group of parrots in the Old World parrot family Psittaculidae. Of the nine extant species in the genus, all are native to the African continent, with the grey-headed lovebird being native to the African island of Madagascar. Social and affectionate, the name comes from the parrots' strong, monogamous pair bonding and the long periods which paired birds spend sitting together. Lovebirds live in small flocks and eat fruit, vegetables, grasses, and seeds. Some species are kept as pets, and several coloured mutations have been selectively bred in aviculture. The average lifespan is 10 to 12 years.

== Description ==
Masked lovebirds calling
Recording of the blue masked lovebird variety.

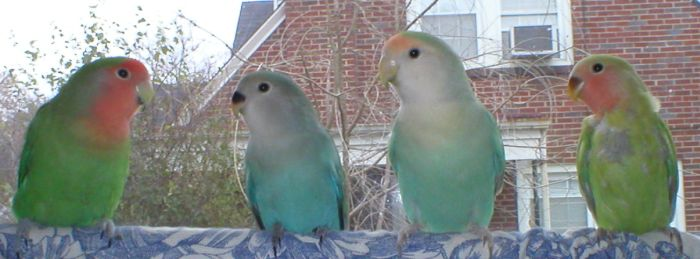
Green- and blue-series peach-faced lovebirds: two parents (left, center-right) with their two recently fledged chicks (center-left, right)

Lovebirds are 13–17 cm (5–7 in) in length, up to 24 cm in wingspan with 9 cm for a single wing and 40–60 g (1 1/2–2 oz) in weight. They are among the smallest parrots, characterised by a stocky build, a short blunt tail, and a relatively large, sharp beak. Wildtype lovebirds are mostly green with a variety of colours on their upper body, depending on the species. The Fischer's lovebird, black-cheeked lovebird, and the masked lovebird have a prominent white ring around their eyes. Many colour mutant varieties have been produced by selective breeding of the species that are popular in aviculture. As of 2019, there are 30 known plumage colour variations among lovebirds, which are caused by pigments called psittacofulvins.

== Taxonomy ==
The genus Agapornis was described by the English naturalist Prideaux John Selby in 1836. The name combines the Ancient Greek αγάπη agape meaning "love" and όρνις ornis meaning "bird". The type species is the black-collared lovebird (Agapornis swindernianus), which was originally placed into the genus Psittacus within a section called Psittacula by naturalist Heinrich Kuhl. Selby contended that this placement rather than a separate genus was "artificial" and done "without regard to the structure, habits, or distribution of the species."

The genus contains nine species of which five are monotypic and four are divided into subspecies. They are native to mainland Africa and the island of Madagascar. In the wild, the different species are separated geographically.

Traditionally, lovebirds are divided into three groups:

- the sexually dimorphic species: Madagascar, Abyssinian, and red-headed lovebird
- the intermediate species: peach-faced lovebird
- the white-eye-ringed species: masked, Fischer's, Lilian's, and black-cheeked lovebirds

However, this division is not fully supported by phylogenetic studies, as the species of the dimorphic group are not grouped together in a single clade.

== Species ==
Species and subspecies:

Genus Agapornis – Selby, 1836 – nine species
| Common name | Scientific name and subspecies | Range | Size and ecology | IUCN status and estimated population |
|---|---|---|---|---|
| Rosy-faced lovebird or peach-faced lovebird | Agapornis roseicollis (Vieillot, 1818) Two subspecies: Agapornis roseicollis catumbella, B.P. Hall, 1952; Agapornis roseicollis roseicollis, (Vieillot 1818) | Southwest Africa | Size: 17–18 cm (6.5–7 in) long. Green and pink. Has blue rump feathers. Habitat: South Africa, Angola, Namibia Diet: herbivores, granivores | LC |
| Yellow-collared lovebird or masked lovebird | Agapornis personatus Reichenow, 1887 | Northeast Tanzania | Size: 14 cm (5.5 in) long. Yellow and green. Has blue tail feathers. Habitat: Tanzania Diet: herbivores, granivores | LC |
| Fischer's lovebird | Agapornis fischeri Reichenow, 1887 | South and southeast of Lake Victoria in northern Tanzania | Size: 14 cm (5.5 in) long. Mostly green, orange upper body and head, blue lower back and rump, red beak, white eyerings. Habitat: Tanzania Diet: herbivores, granivores, frugivores | NT |
| Lilian's lovebird or Nyasa lovebird | Agapornis lilianae (Shelley, 1894) | Malawi | Size: 13 cm (5 in) long. Mostly green including green back and green rump, orange head, red beak, white eyerings. Habitat: Malawi, Mozambique, Tanzania, Zambia, Zimbabwe Diet: herbivores, granivores, frugivores | NT |
| Black-cheeked lovebird | Agapornis nigrigenis W.L. Sclater, 1906 | Zambia | Size: 14 cm (5.5 in) long. Mostly green, brownish-black cheeks and throat, reddish-brown forehead and forecrown, orange upper chest, red beak, white eyerings. Habitat: Zambia Diet: herbivores, granivores | VU |
| Grey-headed lovebird or Madagascar lovebird | Agapornis canus (Gmelin, 1788) Two subspecies: Agapornis canus ablectaneus, Bangs, 1918; Agapornis canus canus, (Gmelin, 1788) | Madagascar | Size: 13 cm (5 in) long. Mostly green with darker green on back, pale grey beak. Sexual dimorphism: male has a grey upper body, neck and head. Habitat: Madagascar Diet: | LC |
| Black-winged lovebird or Abyssinian lovebird | Agapornis taranta (Stanley, 1814) | Southern Eritrea to southwestern Ethiopia | Size: 16.5 cm (6.5 in) long. Mostly green, red beak, some black wing feathers. Sexual dimorphism: only the male has red on forehead and crown, female's plumage is all green. Habitat: Eritrea, Ethiopia Diet: herbivores, granivores, frugivores | LC |
| Red-headed lovebird or red-faced lovebird | Agapornis pullarius (Linnaeus, 1758) Two subspecies: Agapornis pullarius pullarius, (Linnaeus, 1758); Agapornis pullarius ugandae, Neumann, 1908 | Large part of central Africa | Size: 15 cm (6 in) long. Mostly green with red on upper neck and face. Sexual dimorphism: the male has more extensive and a darker red on face and head, and the male has a darker red beak than the female. Habitat: Equatorial Guinea, Angola, Benin, Burundi, Cameroon, Central African Republic, Chad, Congo, DR Congo, Cote d'Ivoire, Ethiopia, Gabon, Ghana, Guinea, Kenya, Mali, Niger, Nigeria, Rwanda, Sierra Leone, South Sudan, Sudan, Tanzania, Togo, Uganda Diet: | LC |
| Black-collared lovebird or Swindern's lovebird | Agapornis swindernianus (Kuhl, 1820) Three subspecies: Agapornis swindernianus emini, Neumann, 1908; Agapornis swindernianus swindernianus, (Kuhl, 1820); Agapornis swindernianus zenkeri, Reichenow, 1895 | Equatorial Africa | Size: 13.5 cm (5 in) long. Mostly green, brown collar which has a black upper margin at the back of the neck, dark grey/black beak. Habitat: Equatorial Guinea, Cameroon, Central African Republic, Congo, DR Congo, Cote d'Ivoire, Gabon, Ghana, Liberia, Uganda Diet: herbivores, frugivores | LC |
| Long-legged lovebird | †Agapornis longipes Pavia, 2024 | Cradle of Humankind | Size: Habitat: Diet: | |

== Nesting ==
Depending on the species of lovebird, the female will carry nesting material into the nest in various ways. The peach-faced lovebird, for example, tucks nesting material in the feathers of its rump.

== Feral populations ==
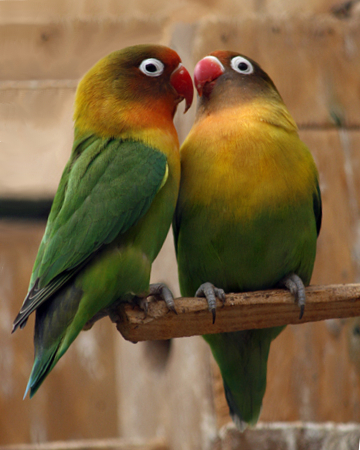
Hybrids (Fischer's lovebird × masked lovebird) in Nairobi, Kenya.

Feral populations of Fischer's lovebirds and masked lovebirds live in cities of East Africa. There are interspecific hybrids that exist between these two species. The hybrid has a reddish-brown head and orange on upper chest, but otherwise resembles the masked lovebird.

There are two feral colonies present in the Pretoria region (Silver Lakes, Faerie Glen and Centurion) in South Africa. They probably originated from birds that escaped from aviaries. They consist mostly of masked, black cheeked, Fischer and hybrid birds and vary in colours. White (not albino) and yellow as well as blue occur in many cases. The white ringed eyes are very prominent.

There is a notable feral colony in Arizona, consisting of mostly Rosy-faced lovebirds. They originated from birds that escaped the pet trade, and were first seen in the state during the 1980s. The first breeding pair in Arizona was discovered in 1998.

== Diet and health ==
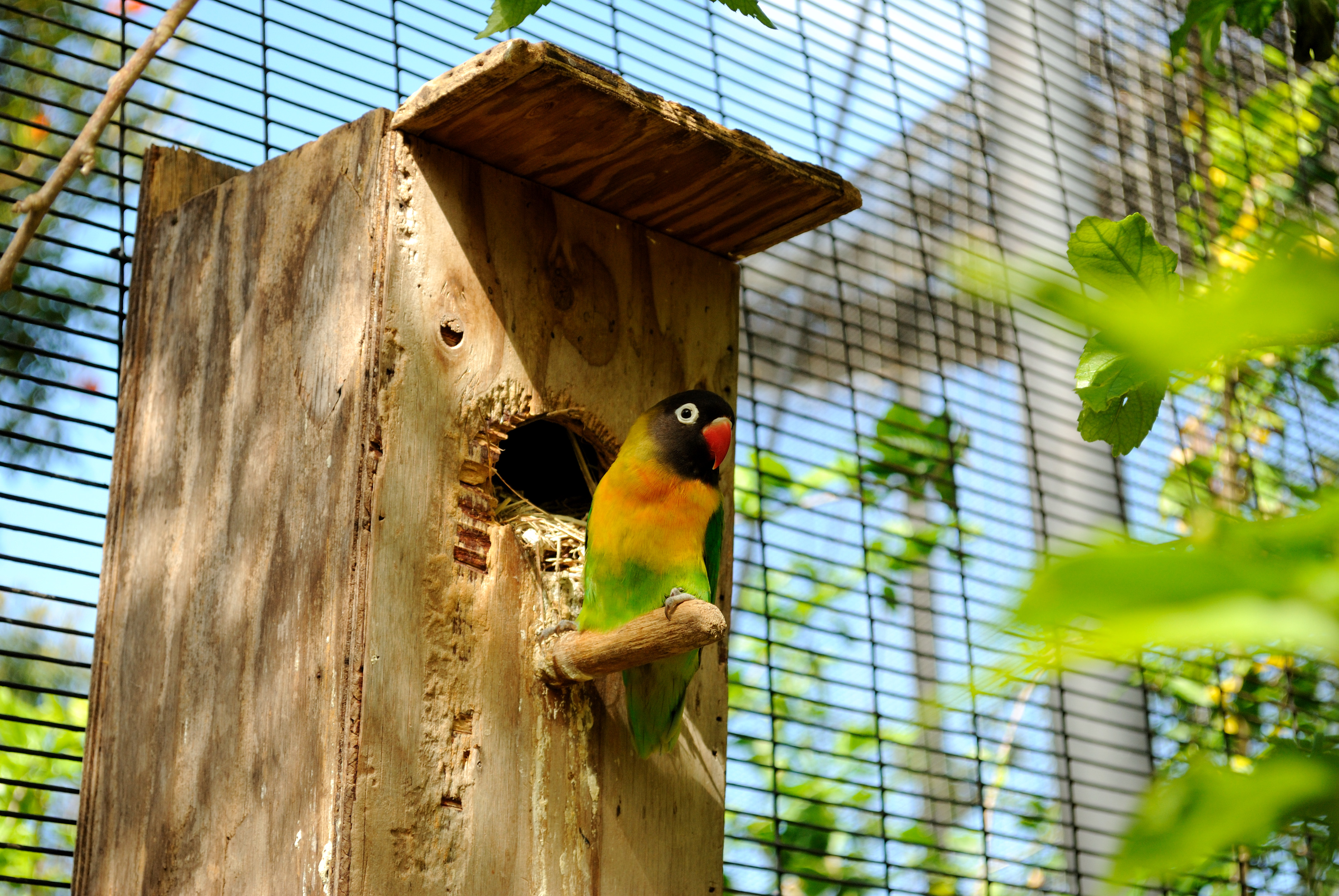
A yellow-collared lovebird perching by the entrance to a nest box in a large aviary at the Honolulu Zoo, Hawaii, USA

Parrots are generally vegetarian species. Lovebirds forage for their food. In the wild, their diet mainly consists of seeds, grains, and leaves from trees, shrubs, and tall grass.

Masked lovebirds calling
Recording of the blue masked lovebird variety.

Wild lovebirds may harbor diseases such as avian polyomavirus.
