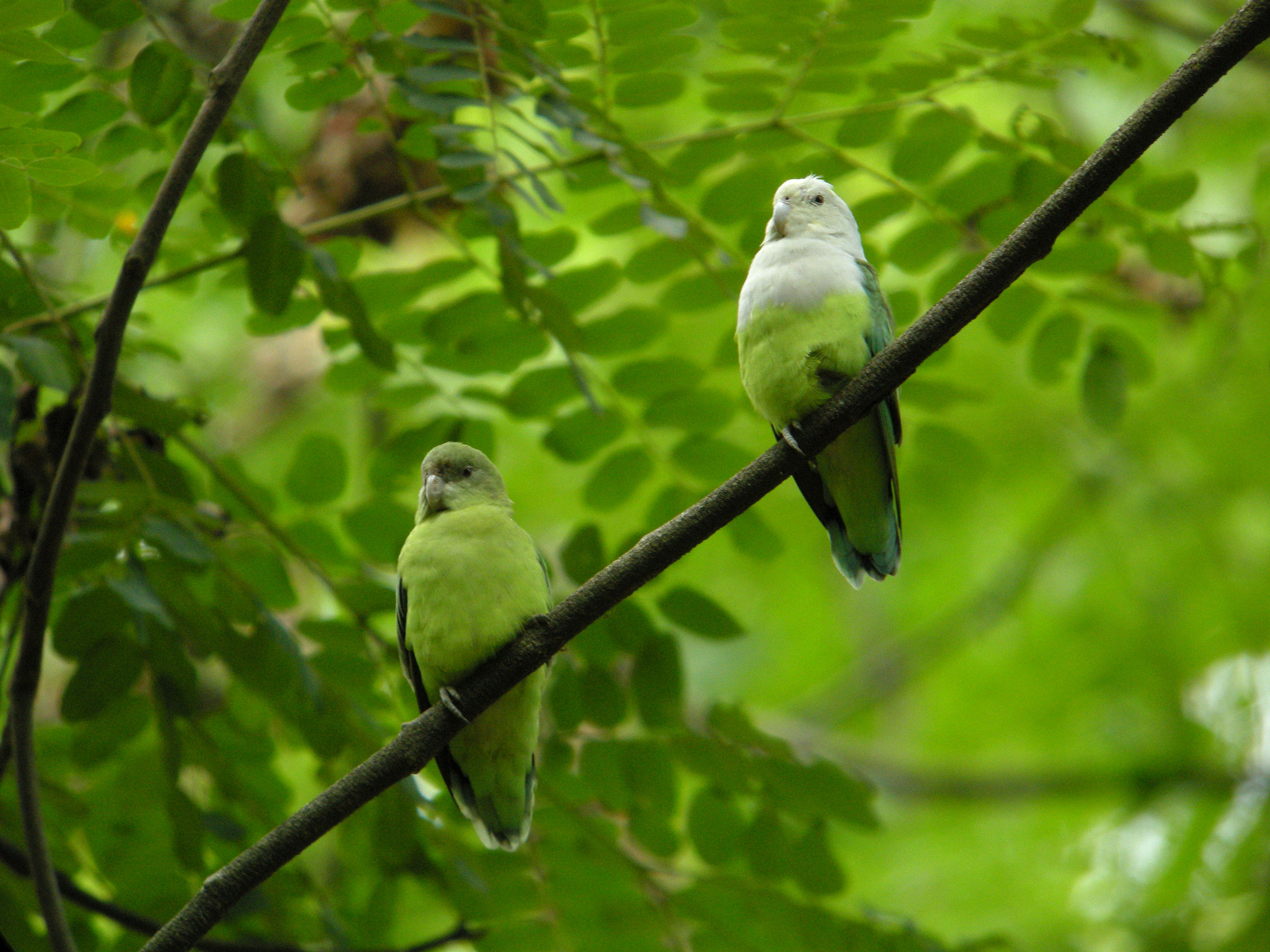
- A pair in Madagascar

Conservation status
- Least Concern (IUCN 3.1)
- CITES Appendix II

Scientific classification
- Kingdom: Animalia
- Phylum: Chordata
- Class: Aves
- Order: Psittaciformes
- Family: Psittaculidae
- Genus: Agapornis
- Species: A. canus

Binomial name
- Agapornis canus (Gmelin, JF, 1788)

= Grey-headed lovebird =

Species of bird

The gray-headed lovebird or Madagascar lovebird (Agapornis canus) is a small species of parrot of the lovebird genus. It is a mainly green parrot. The species is sexually dimorphic and only the adult male has grey on its upper body. They are native on the island of Madagascar and are the only lovebird species which are not native on the African continent. They are the smallest of the lovebird species. It is rarely seen in aviculture and it is difficult to breed in captivity.

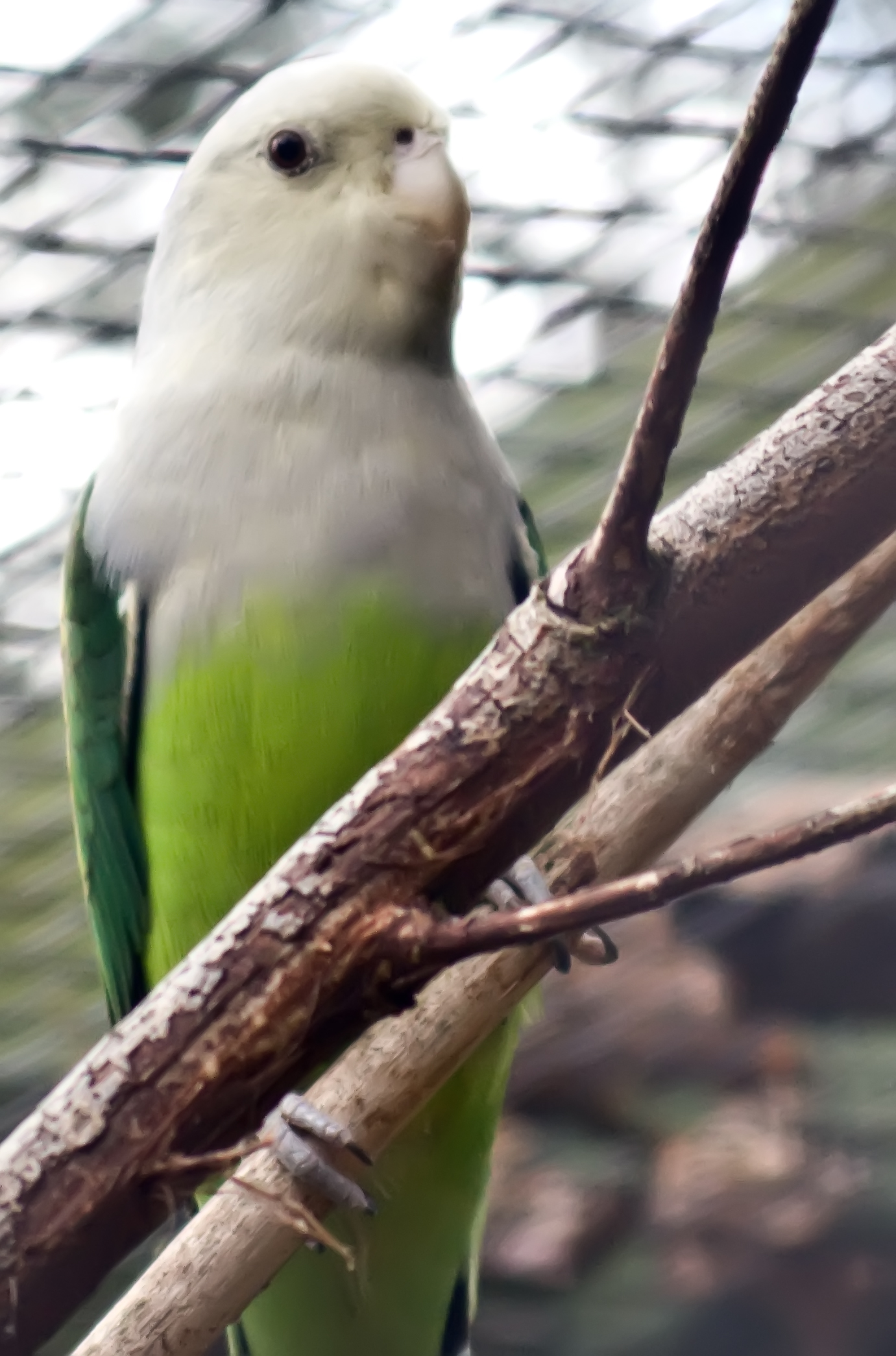
Male at Beale Park, England

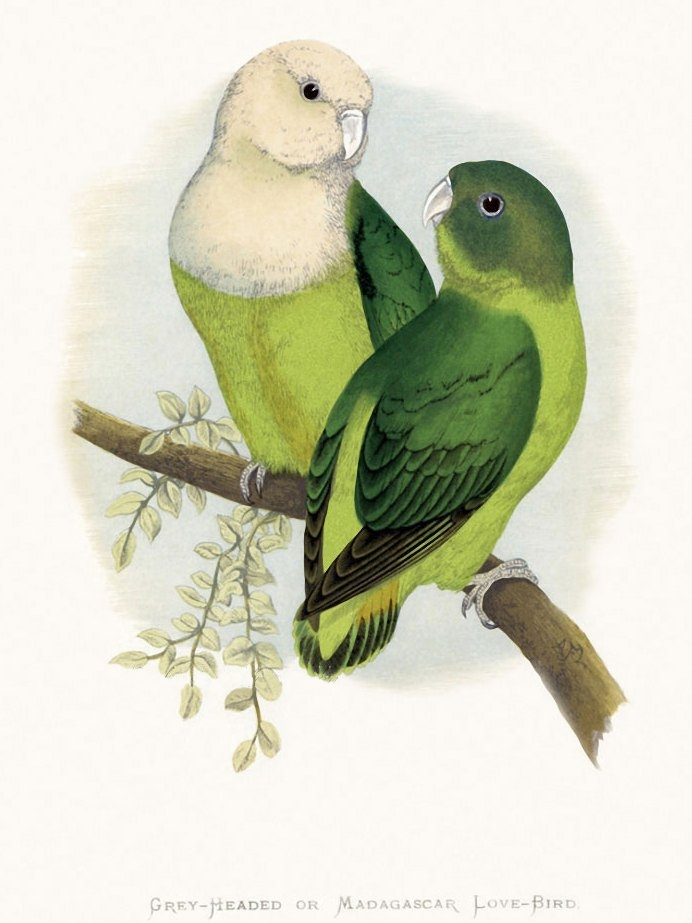
Illustration of a pair

== Taxonomy ==
In 1760 the French zoologist Mathurin Jacques Brisson included a description and an illustration of the grey-headed lovebird in his Ornithologie based on a specimen collected in Madagascar. He used the French name La petite perruche de Madagascar and the Latin Psittacula Madagascariensis. Although Brisson coined Latin names, these do not conform to the binomial system and are not recognised by the International Commission on Zoological Nomenclature. The lovebird was subsequently described by the French polymath Georges-Louis Leclerc, Comte de Buffon in 1779 and the English ornithologist John Latham in 1781, but neither author included a binomial name. When in 1788 the German naturalist Johann Friedrich Gmelin revised and expanded Carl Linnaeus's Systema Naturae, he included the grey-headed lovebird. He placed it with all the other parrots in the genus Psittacus, coined the binomial name Psittacus canus and cited the earlier publications. The grey-headed lovebird is now placed with seven other lovebirds in the genus Agapornis that was introduced by the English naturalist Prideaux John Selby in 1836. The genus name combines the Ancient Greek αγάπη agape meaning "love" and όρνις ornis meaning "bird". The specific epithet canus is the Latin word for "grey".

Two subspecies are recognised:

- A. c. canus (Gmelin, JF, 1788) – Madagascar (except the south)
- A. c. ablectaneus Bangs, 1918 – southern Madagascar

== Description ==
The grey-headed lovebird is one of the smallest species of the lovebird genus, being 13 cm (5 inches) long and weighing about 30–36 grams. Its beak and feet are pale grey. The species is sexually dimorphic: the adult female is entirely green, with a dark green back and wings, a bright green rump, and a paler green chest; the adult male are similarly colored, except that their entire head and upper chest are a pale grey.

== Behaviour ==
Grey-headed lovebirds are strong fliers, and when open, their wings seem larger in relation to their bodies than those of the peach-faced lovebird. They can develop good speed quite quickly and effortlessly, and turn smoothly, though they are not as nimble in the air as the peach-faced lovebirds.

== Aviculture ==
Grey-headed lovebirds were first imported for European aviculture in the second half of the nineteenth century. When imports were permitted and they were available to aviculture in large numbers, little effort was put into breeding. They prefer to breed in the autumn, and because they have poor tolerance for cold weather breeding in aviculture is generally unsuccessful. They tend to be nervous and easily frightened in an aviary.

It is quite rare in captivity, with only a very few breeders having successfully reproduced more than one or two generations. This, and the fact that even hand-fed birds remain too shy and nervous to make good pets, are clear reasons for any captive Madagascars to be given a chance to breed, rather than being kept as pets.

Grey-headed lovebirds prefer finch and canary seed over the sunflower/safflower mixes that most other lovebirds eat.
