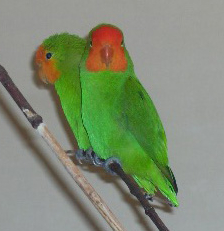
- Male (foreground) and female

Conservation status
- Least Concern (IUCN 3.1)
- CITES Appendix II (CITES)

Scientific classification
- Kingdom: Animalia
- Phylum: Chordata
- Class: Aves
- Order: Psittaciformes
- Family: Psittaculidae
- Genus: Agapornis
- Species: A. pullarius

Binomial name
- Agapornis pullarius (Linnaeus, 1758)

Synonyms
- Psittacus pullarius Linnaeus, 1758

= Red-headed lovebird =

Species of bird

3D scan of skeleton

The red-headed lovebird (Agapornis pullarius), also known as the red-faced lovebird, is a member of the genus Agapornis, a group commonly known as lovebirds. Like other lovebirds, it is native to Africa.

== Taxonomy ==
The red-headed lovebird was formally described in 1758 by the Swedish naturalist Carl Linnaeus in the tenth edition of his Systema Naturae. He placed it with all the other parrots in the genus Psittacus and coined the binomial name Psittacus pullarius. The type locality is Ghana. The red-headed lovebird is now one of nine species placed in the genus Agapornis that was introduced in 1836 by the English naturalist Prideaux John Selby. The genus name combines the Ancient Greek ἀγάπη agápē meaning "love" and ὄρνις órnis meaning "bird". The specific epithet pullārius is from Latin and means "of young birds" (pullus means "chick").

Two subspecies are recognised:

- A. p. pullarius (Linnaeus, 1758) – Guinea and Sierra Leone to Sudan, DR Congo and Angola
- A. p. ugandae Neumann, 1908 – west Ethiopia to east DR Congo and northwest Tanzania

== Description ==
The red-headed lovebird is a 15 cm (6 inches) long, mostly green parrot. It has a well demarcated red area on its head extending from the top of the beak, over the forehead to mid-crown, and extending to the left and right up to the eyelid margins. It has grey feet. The underside of the wings is a lighter green. The female has orange head colouring, which is less well demarcated than the male's red head. The adult male has a red beak while the female's is a paler red.

== Distribution and habitat ==
It has a patchy distribution across the African tropical rainforest.

== Breeding ==
It makes its nest in a termites nest usually in a tree or sometimes on the ground. To make a nest the female digs a tunnel up to a length of 30 cm (12 in) in the termites nest in a colony with other lovebirds.

== Aviculture ==
It is difficult to breed in captivity because it has to burrow to make its nest and the nest chamber needs to be heated to about 27 °C (81 °F); however, they can be induced to burrow into cork to build a nest. It is a very nervous species.
