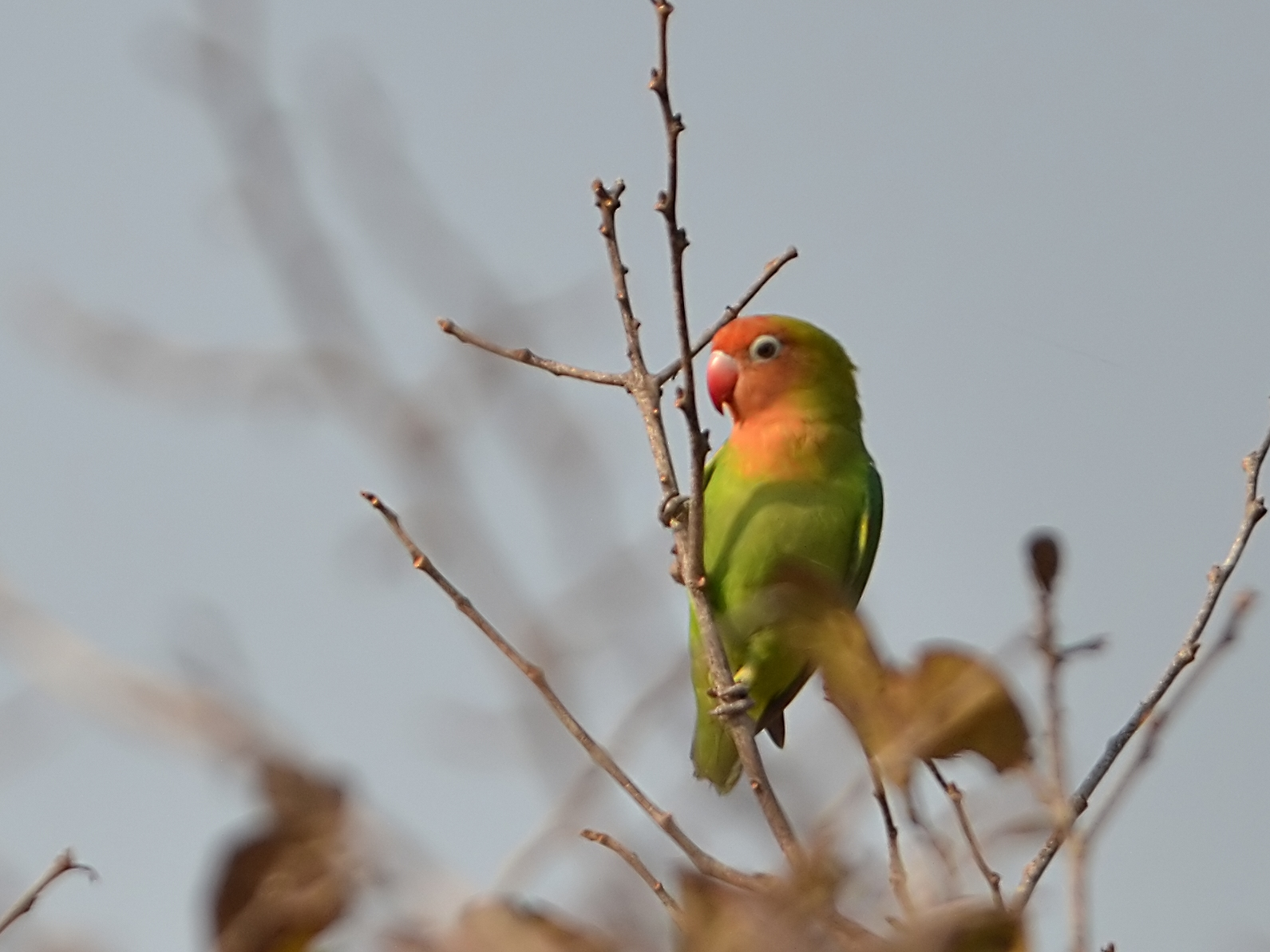

Conservation status
- Near Threatened (IUCN 3.1)
- CITES Appendix II (CITES)

Scientific classification
- Kingdom: Animalia
- Phylum: Chordata
- Class: Aves
- Order: Psittaciformes
- Family: Psittaculidae
- Genus: Agapornis
- Species: A. lilianae

Binomial name
- Agapornis lilianae Shelley, 1894
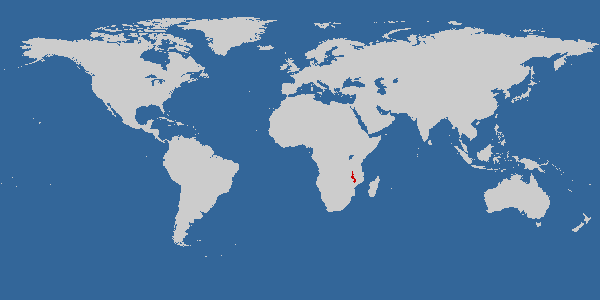
- Range in red.

= Lilian's lovebird =

Species of bird

Lilian's lovebird (Agapornis lilianae), also known as the Nyasa lovebird, is a small African parrot species of the lovebird genus. It is mainly green and has orange on its upper chest and head. It is 13 cm (5 inches) long and is the smallest parrot on mainland Africa. In captivity, it is uncommon and difficult to breed.

== Description ==
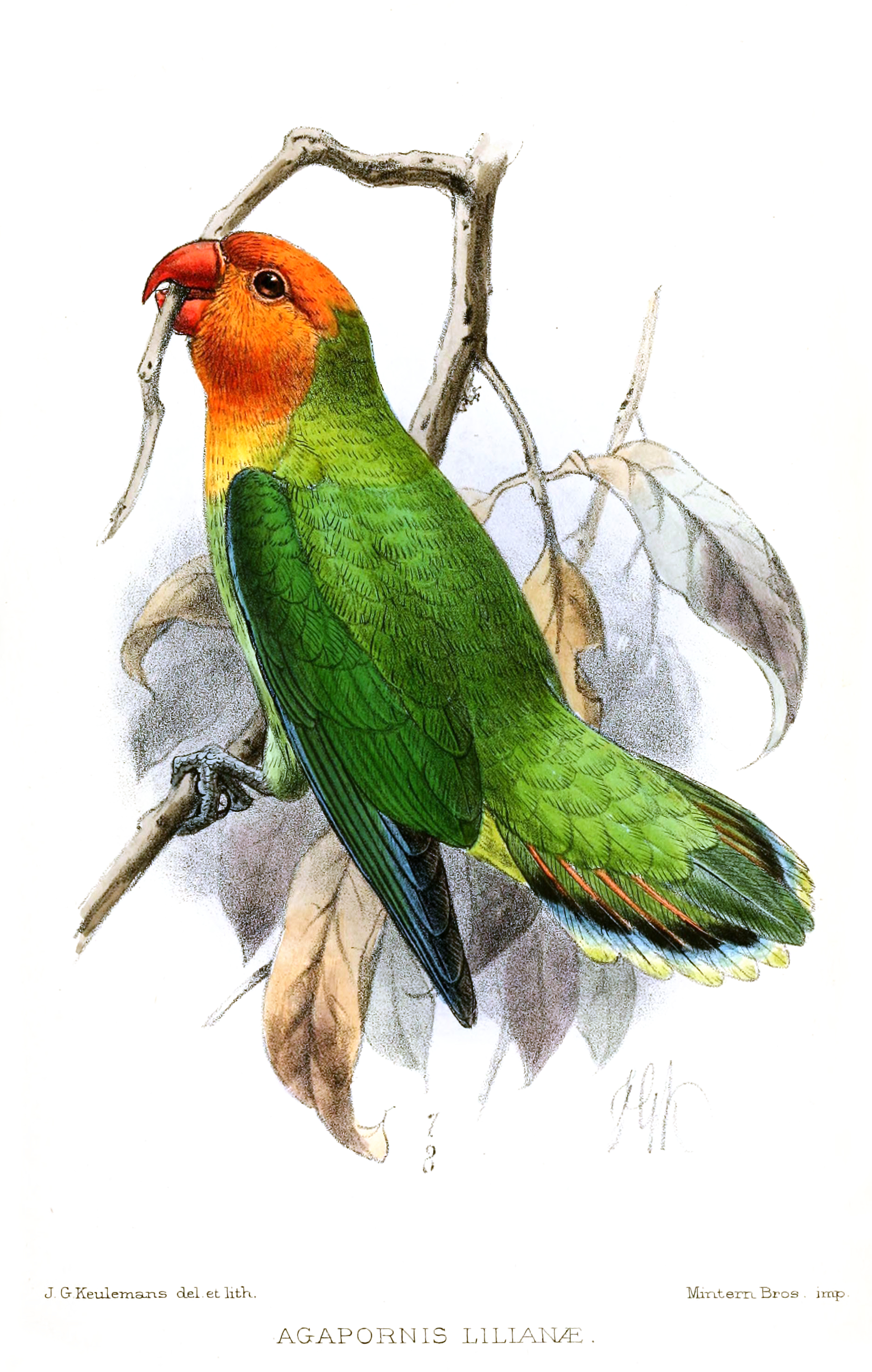

The Lilian's lovebird is 13 cm (5 inches) long and is mainly green with white eyerings. It has orange on its head, neck and upper chest and has a green rump. Male and female are identical in external appearance.

The Lilian's lovebird is often mistaken for the slightly larger Fischer's lovebird, which has an olive-green hood and a blue rump. It is also broadly similar to the rosy-faced lovebird, which has more clearly demarcated orange colouration, and lacks a white eyering.

=== Food and feeding ===
Lilian's lovebirds feed on grass seeds, millet, wild rice, flowers, and the seeds and fruit of other species.

=== Breeding ===
The breeding season for Lilian's lovebirds is from January to March and in June and July. They make a roofed nest in tree crevices. In captivity the clutch consists of three to eight white eggs, which are incubated for about 22 days, and the chicks leave the nest after about 44 days from hatching.

== Distribution and habitat ==
Lilian's lovebirds are endemic to Malawi, Mozambique, Tanzania, Zambia, and Zimbabwe. In 2004 its numbers in the wild were estimated to be less than 20,000 individuals. It currently inhabits Liwonde National Park (LNP) and a few cluster groups occur in the surrounding forests outside LNP. Its distribution is rapidly becoming restricted to LNP because their feeding and breeding habitats are being exploited over for agricultural purposes. The extent of habitat loss outside LNP has not been determined scientifically although remaining habitat outside the LNP are fragmented Miombo Forest Reserves.

== Threats ==
Liwonde National Park is located in the southern region of Malawi, which has the highest human population density in the country approximating 100-115 inhabitants per km^{2} (FAO, 1997). LNP is greatly impacted by population growth and agricultural activities than any other national park in the country. Recently, cases of Lilian's lovebird poisoning have intensified although it is not known why poachers are poisoning the birds. Lilian's lovebird researchers assume poachers mean to poison larger mammals and lovebirds fall victims.

== Lifespan and health issues ==
The lifespan for Lilian's lovebirds is 10–12 years. The major health concern for these species is loneliness. These birds mate for life.

== Similarities ==
Mitochondrial gene for Lilian's lovebird aligns with rosy-faced lovebirds.

== Aviculture ==
Lilian's lovebirds are a difficult species to rear in captivity. Many breeders worldwide struggle to breed the species.
