= Bronze fallow cockatiel =

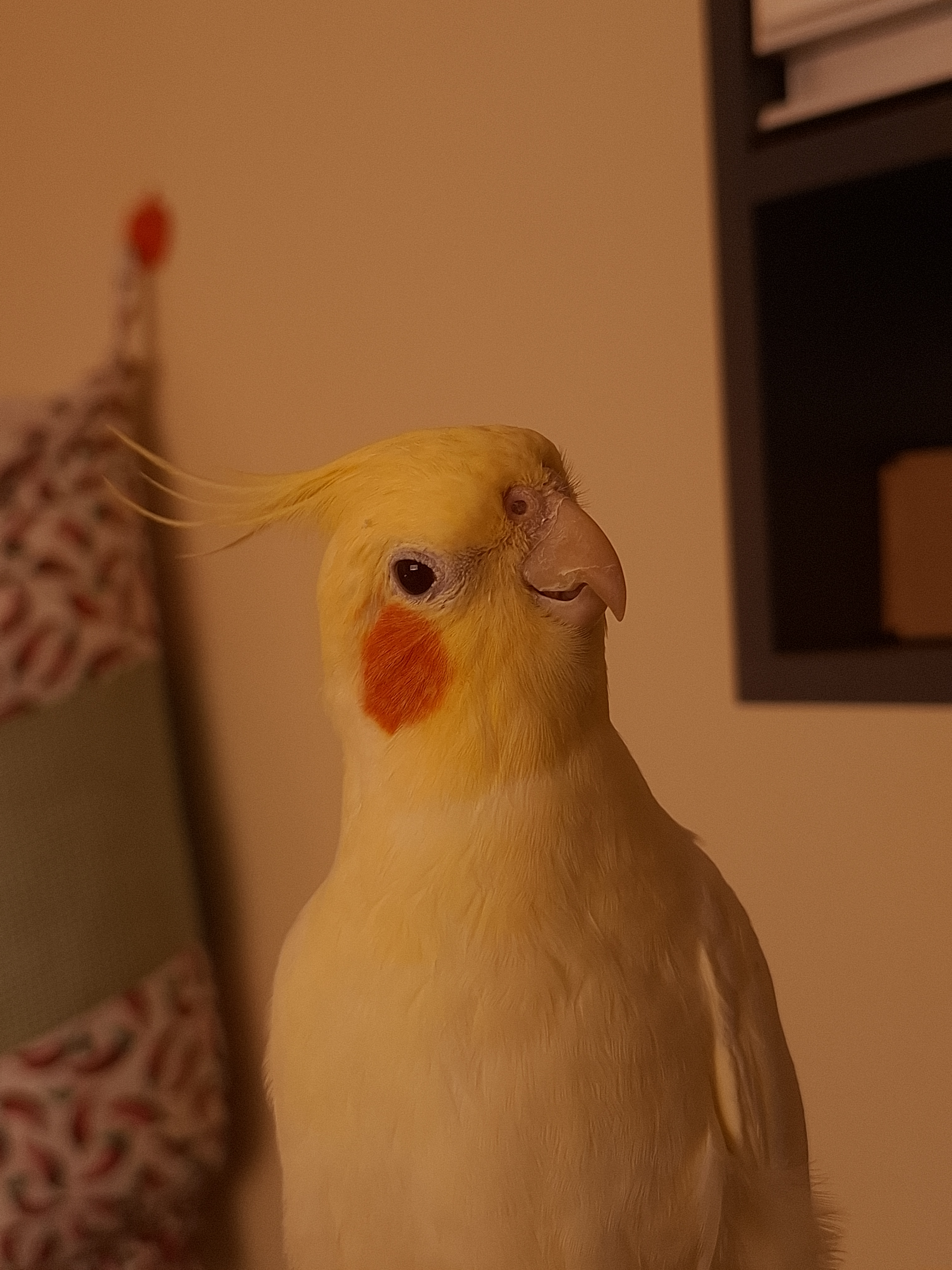
Domestic bronze fallow cockatiel.

The bronze fallow cockatiel is a kind of cockatiel that sports red eyes. It was first seen in the bird house belonging to Irma Vowels in Florida. It is also known as a fallow.

== Description ==
When a bronze fallow cockatiel is born, it has a pale pink eye. As they mature, the eye color slightly darkens, a bronze fallow cockatiel's eyes are lighter than a Lutino cockatiel, whose red eye is darker. A yellow wash may emerge across the body.

One feature is unlike other mutations. Male bronze fallow cockatiels differ from females. Females are usually softer while the males may have light color at a young age, but darken as they mature.

== Sound ==
Bronzefallow Cockatiel
All cockatiel colour genetic mutations have the same Tweet.

== See also ==
- Cockatiel
- Lutino cockatiel
- Pearl cockatiel
- Cockatiel color genetics
- Whiteface cockatiel
- Pied cockatiel
