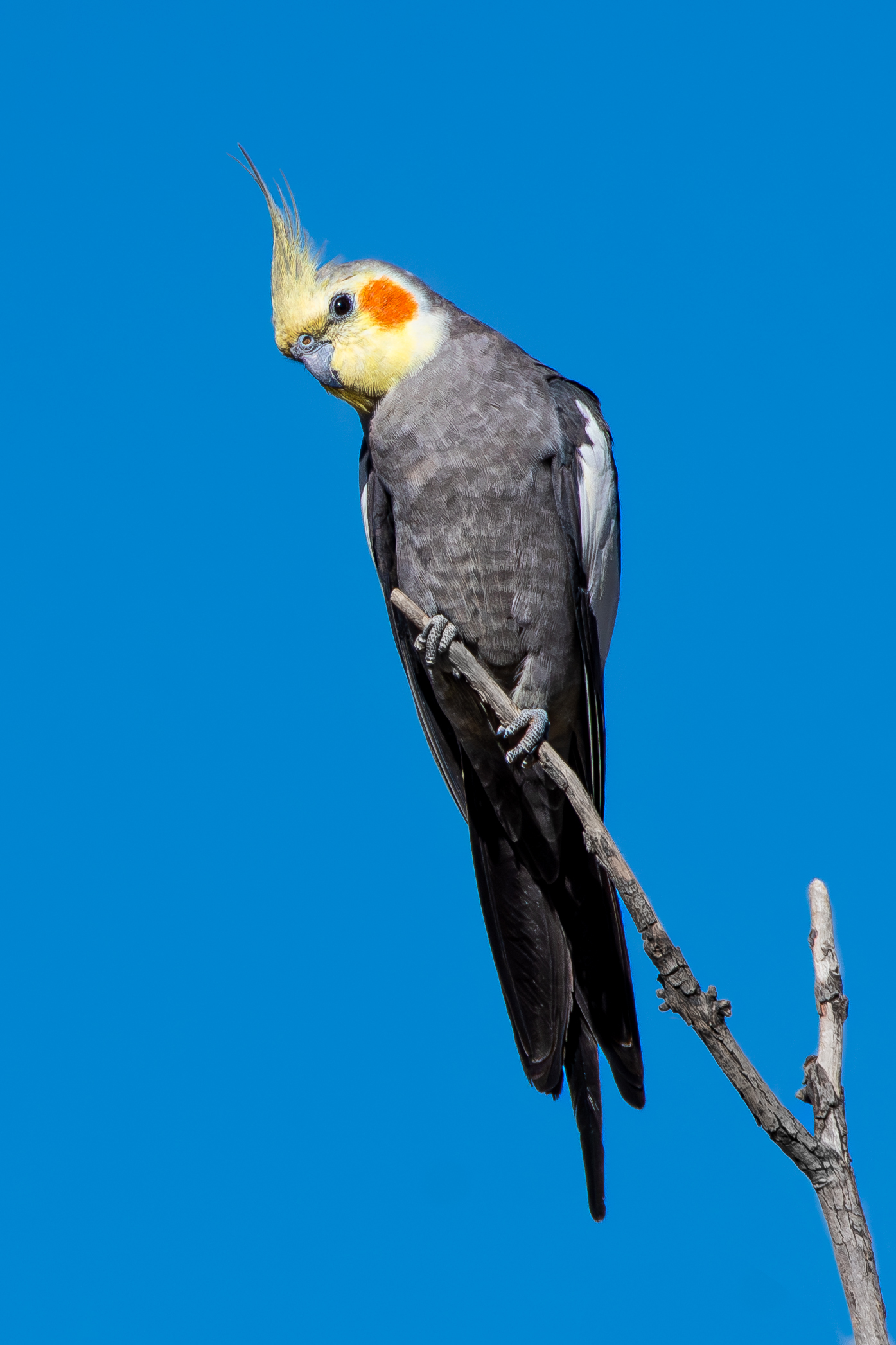
- A male cockatiel
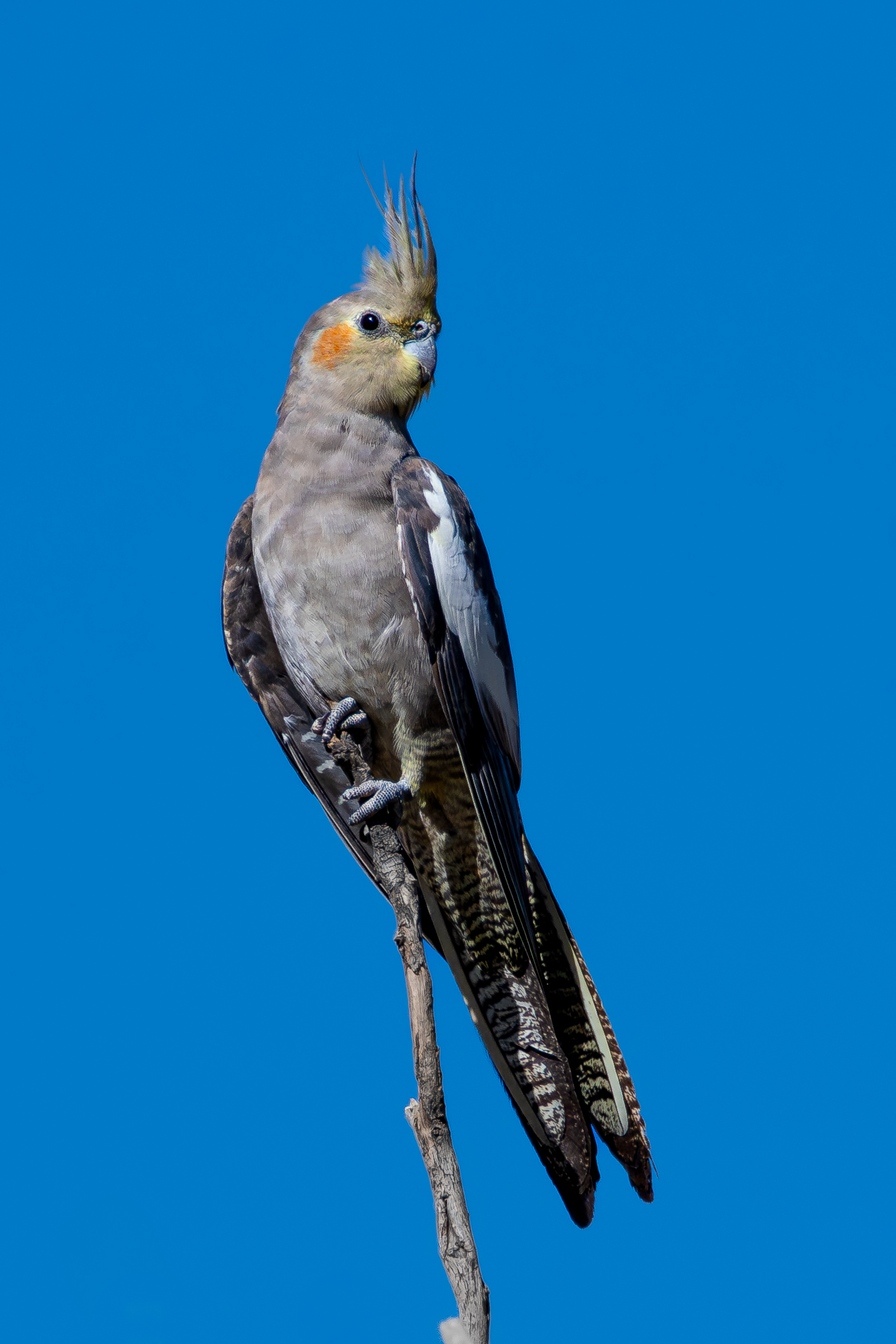
- A female cockatiel, or immature cockatiel

Conservation status
- Least Concern (IUCN 3.1)

Scientific classification
- Kingdom: Animalia
- Phylum: Chordata
- Class: Aves
- Order: Psittaciformes
- Family: Cacatuidae
- Subfamily: Nymphicinae
- Genus: Nymphicus; Wagler, 1832
- Species: N. hollandicus

Binomial name
- Nymphicus hollandicus (Kerr, 1792)
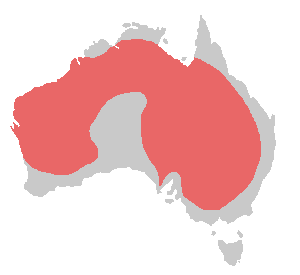
- Red: all-year resident

Synonyms
- Psittacus hollandicus Kerr, 1792; Leptolophus hollandicus Cockatiel calling Recording of a cockatiel

= Cockatiel =

Species of bird

The cockatiel (Nymphicus hollandicus), also known as the weero/weiro or quarrion, is a species of small- to medium-sized parrot belonging to the cockatoo family (Cacatuidae), of which it is the smallest member. Native to Australia, it is the sole member of the genus Nymphicus.

Cockatiels are widely recognized for their bright orange cheek patches, long tail feathers, and sociable, playful nature. Their strong affinity for human interaction has placed them among the most commonly kept companion parrots worldwide, being kept in an estimated 4.8 million US households as one of the top five most popular pet bird species. However, insufficient knowledge of their care contributes to one of the highest surrender rates among pet bird species.

Proper care requires regular social interaction with owners, as well as a suitable nutritionally appropriate diet, toy-based enrichment, annual veterinary check-ups and prompt attention when signs of illness or respiratory issues appear, perches of varying diameters, UV exposure, and about two hours of daily out-of-cage time. Due to many owners' unfamiliarity with these requirements, many cockatiels suffer chronic malnutrition and behavioral problems and are often relinquished to shelters within approximately 1.5 years of adoption.

The cockatiel is the only member of the genus Nymphicus. It was previously unclear whether the cockatiel is a crested parakeet or small cockatoo; however, more recent molecular studies have assigned it to its own subfamily, Nymphicinae. It is, therefore, now classified as the smallest subfamily of the Cacatuidae (cockatoo family). Cockatiels are native to Australia, favouring the Australian wetlands, scrublands, and bushlands. There are many different mutations of this bird.

== Taxonomy and etymology ==
Originally described by J. F. Gmelin in an edition of Systema naturae in 1788 as Psittacus novaehollandiae, and after by Scottish writer and naturalist Robert Kerr in 1792 as Psittacus hollandicus, and finally moved to its own genus, Nymphicus, by Wagler in 1832. Its genus name reflects the experience of one of the earliest groups of Europeans to see the birds in their native habitat; the travellers thought the birds were so beautiful that they named them after mythical nymphs. The specific name hollandicus refers to New Holland, a historical name for Australia.

Its biological relationships were for a long time uncertain; it is now placed in a monotypic subfamily Nymphicinae, but was sometimes in the past classified among the Platycercinae, the broad-tailed parrots. This issue was settled with molecular studies. A 1984 study of protein allozymes signalled its closer relationship to cockatoos than to other parrots, and mitochondrial 12S rRNA sequence data places it among the Calyptorhynchinae (dark cockatoos) subfamily. The unique, parakeet (meaning long-tailed parrot) morphological feature is a consequence of the decrease in size and accompanying change of ecological niche.

Sequence analysis of intron 7 of the nuclear β-fibrinogen gene, on the other hand, indicates that it may yet be distinct enough as to warrant recognition of the Nymphicinae rather than inclusion of the genus in the Calyptorhynchinae.

The cockatiel is now biologically classified as a genuine member of Cacatuidae on account of sharing all of the cockatoo family's biological features, namely, the erectile crest, a gallbladder, powder down, suppressed cloudy-layer (which precludes the display of blue and green structural colours), and facial feathers covering the sides of the beak, all of which are rarely found outside the family Cacatuidae. This biological relation to other cockatoos is further supported by the existence of at least one documented case of a successful hybrid between a cockatiel and a galah. These hybrids, are often referred to as galatiels.

== Distribution and habitat ==
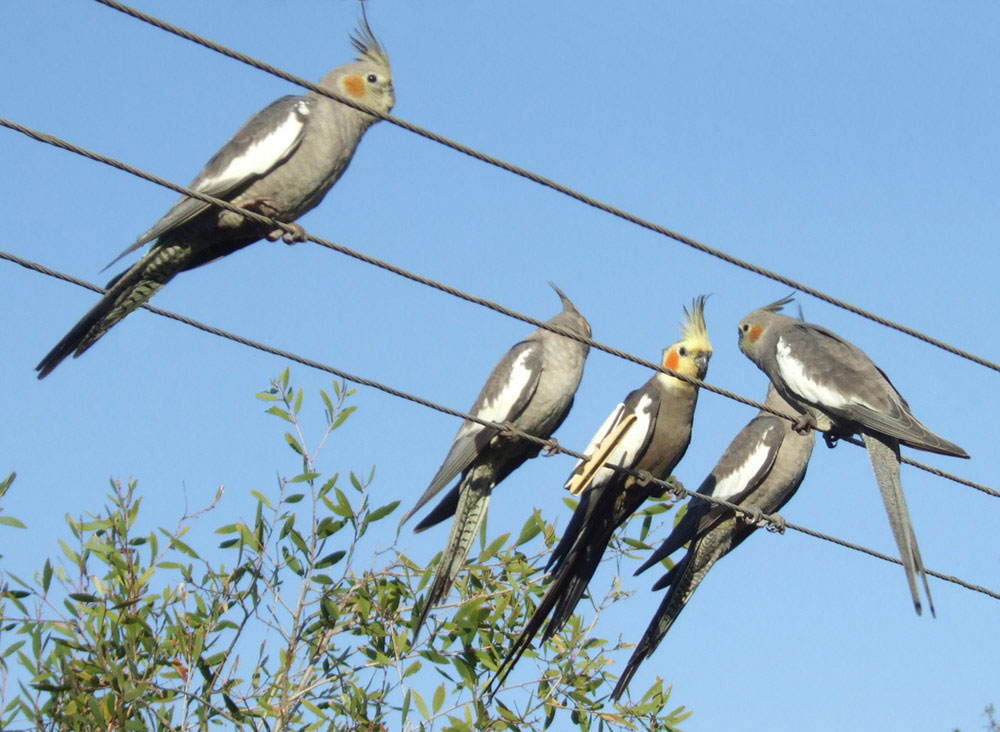
Wild cockatiels, Australia

Cockatiels are native to Australia, where they are found largely in arid or semi-arid country but always close to water. Largely nomadic, the species will move to where food and water is available. They are typically seen in pairs or small flocks. Sometimes, hundreds will flock around a single body of water. Wild cockatiels typically eat seeds, particularly Acacia, wheat, sunflower and Sorghum. To many farmers' dismay, they often eat cultivated crops. Cockatiels may be observed in and around western New South Wales and Queensland, Alice Springs, the Kimberley region and the northwestern corner of Western Australia. They are absent from the most fertile southwest and southeast corners of the country, the deepest Western Australian deserts, and Cape York Peninsula.

== Description ==
=== Appearance ===
The cockatiel's distinctive crest expresses the animal's emotional state. The crest is dramatically vertical when the cockatiel is startled or excited, gently oblique in its neutral or relaxed state, and flattened close to the head when the animal is angry or defensive. The crest is also held flat but protrudes outward in the back when the cockatiel is trying to appear alluring or flirtatious. When the cockatiel is tired, the crest is seen positioned halfway upwards, with the tip of the crest usually curling upward. In contrast to most cockatoos, the cockatiel has long tail feathers roughly making up half of its total length. At 30 to 33 cm (12 to 13 in), the cockatiel is the smallest of the cockatoos, which are generally larger at between 30 and 60 cm (12 and 24 in).

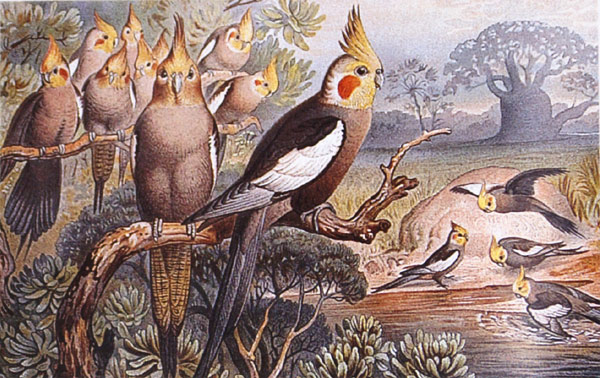
1927 Brehms Tierleben painting

The "normal grey" or "wild-type" cockatiel's plumage is primarily grey with prominent white flashes on the outer edges of each wing. The face of the male is yellow or white, while the face of the female is primarily grey or light grey, and both sexes feature a round orange area on both ears, often referred to as "cheddar cheeks". This orange colouration is generally vibrant in adult males, and often quite muted in females. Visual sexing is often possible with this variant of the bird.

=== Sexual dimorphism ===
Most wild cockatiel chicks and juveniles look female, and are virtually indistinguishable from the time of hatching until their first moulting. They display horizontal yellow stripes or bars on the ventral surface of their tail feathers, yellow spots on the ventral surface of the primary flight feathers of their wings, a grey coloured crest and face, and a dull orange patch on each of their cheeks. However some modern-day mutations are sex linked and the male and female chicks are easily distinguishable as soon as their feathers come in.

Adult cockatiels with common coloring (grey body with yellow head) are sexually dimorphic, though to a lesser degree than many other avian species. This is only evident after the first moulting, typically occurring about six to nine months after hatching: the male loses the white or yellow barring and spots on the underside of his tail feathers and wings. The grey feathers on his cheeks and crest are replaced by bright yellow feathers, while the orange cheek patch becomes brighter and more distinct. The face and crest of the female will typically remain mostly grey with a yellowish tint, and a less vibrant orange cheek patch. Additionally, the female commonly retains the horizontal barring on the underside of her tail feathers.

The colour in cockatiels is derived from two pigments: melanin (which provides the grey colour in the feathers, eyes, beak, and feet), and psittacofulvins (which provide the yellow colour on the face and tail and the orange colour of the cheek patch). The grey colour of the melanin overrides the yellow and orange of the psittacofulvins when both are present.

The melanin content decreases in the face of the males as they mature, allowing the yellow and orange psittacofulvins to be more visible, while an increase in melanin content in the tail causes the disappearance of the horizontal yellow tail bars.

In addition to these visible characteristics, the vocalisation of adult males is typically louder and more complex than that of females. But like most things this is not a hard and fast rule.

=== Dander ===
Cockatiels, like other cockatoos, often shed a white, fine powder that is often referred to as bird dander. This dust is mostly composed of broken down feather sheaths, skin cells and various secretions from the preen gland. When frequently inhaled, it can cause various health problems, notably, hay fever, bird fancier's lung and allergic reactions. When keeping cockatiels in a living area, like a living room or bedroom, it is advised to use an air filter and frequently wipe or vacuum the dust in the area.

=== Colour mutations ===
Worldwide there are currently 22 cockatiel colour mutations established in aviculture, of which eight are exclusive to Australia. Mutations in captivity have emerged in various colours, some quite different from those observed in nature. Wild cockatiels are grey with visible differences between males and females. Male grey cockatiels typically have yellow heads while the females have a grey head. Juveniles tend to look like females with pinker beaks. The pied mutation first appeared in California in 1949. This mutation is a blotch of colour on an otherwise solid-coloured bird. For example, this may appear as a grey blotch on a yellow cockatiel.

Flock of lutino cockatiels in an aviary

Lutino colouration was first seen in 1958. These birds lack the grey of their wild counterparts and are white to soft yellow. This is a popular colour; due to inbreeding, these cockatiels often have a small bald patch behind their crests. The cinnamon mutation, first seen in the 1950s, is very similar in appearance to the grey; however, these birds have a warmer, browner colouring. Pearling was first seen in 1967. This is seen as a feather of one colour with a different coloured edge, such as grey feathers with yellow tips. This distinctive pattern is on a bird's wings or back. The albino colour mutation is a lack of pigment. These birds are white with red eyes. Fallow cockatiels first appeared sometime in the 1970s. This mutation shows as a bird with cinnamon colouring with yellow sections. Other mutations include emerald/olive, dominant and recessive silver, and mutations exclusive to Australia: Australian fallow, faded (west coast silver), dilute/pastel silver (east coast silver), silver spangle (edged dilute), platinum, suffused (Australian olive), and pewter. Other mutations, such as face altering mutations, include whiteface, pastelface, dominant yellow cheek, sex-linked yellow cheek, gold cheek, cream face, and the Australian yellow cheek.

Cockatiel colour mutations can become even more complex as one bird can have multiple colour mutations. For example, a yellow lutino cockatiel may have pearling – white spots on its back and wings. This is a double mutation. An example of a quadruple mutation would be cinnamon cockatiel with yellowface colouring with pearling and pied markings.

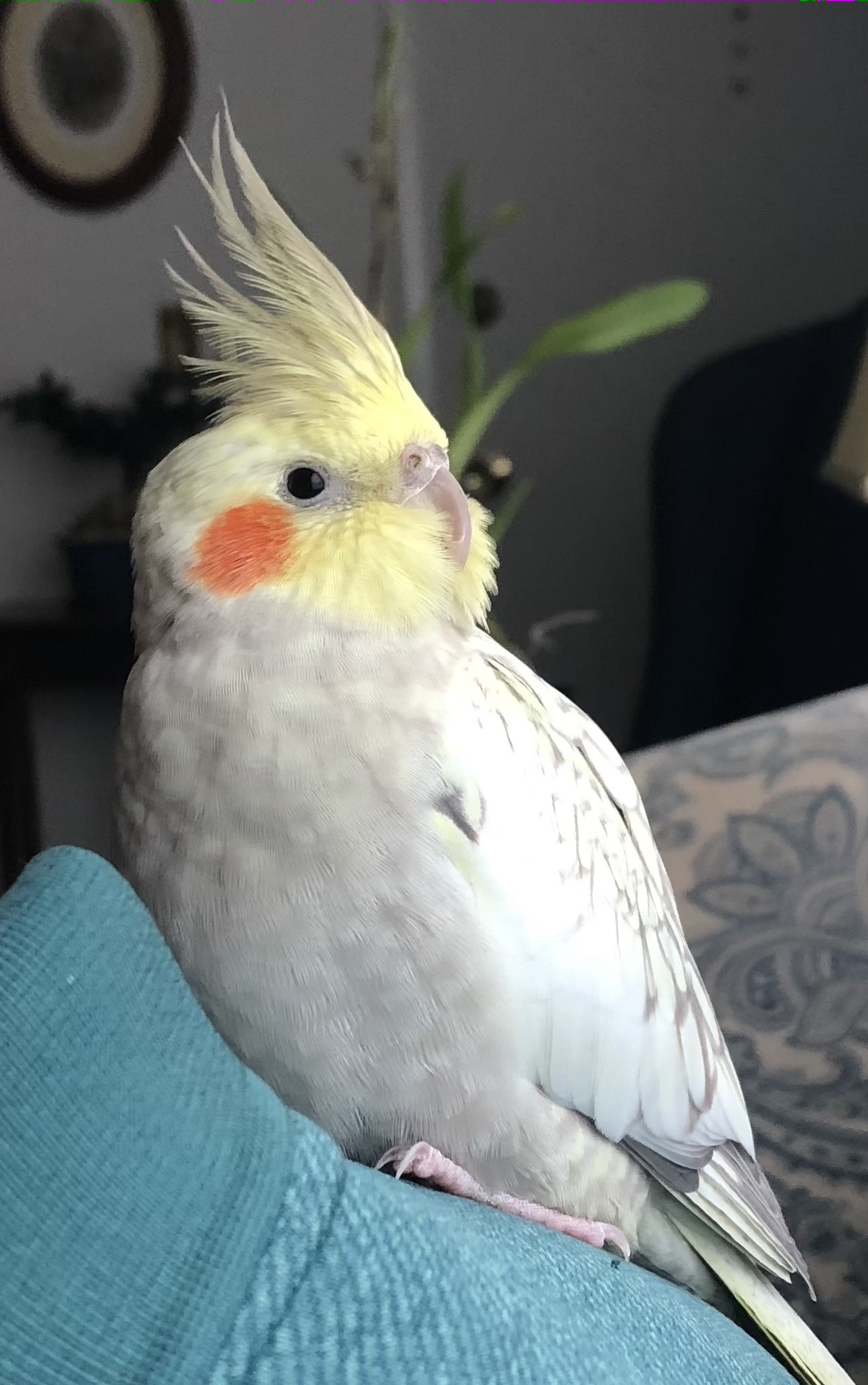
Female pearl cockatiel

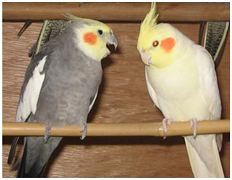
Two different-coloured male cockatiels

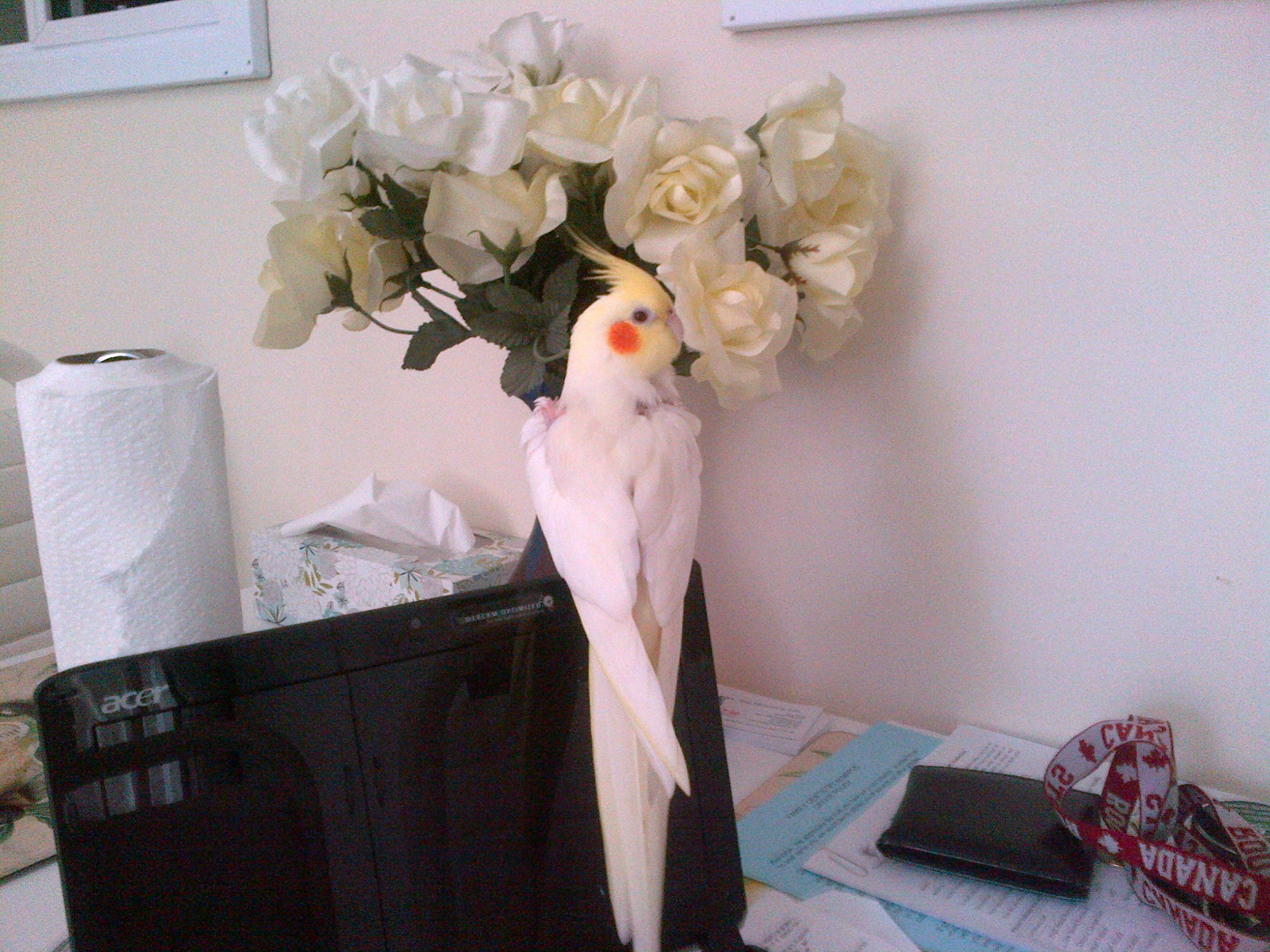
Female lutino cockatiel

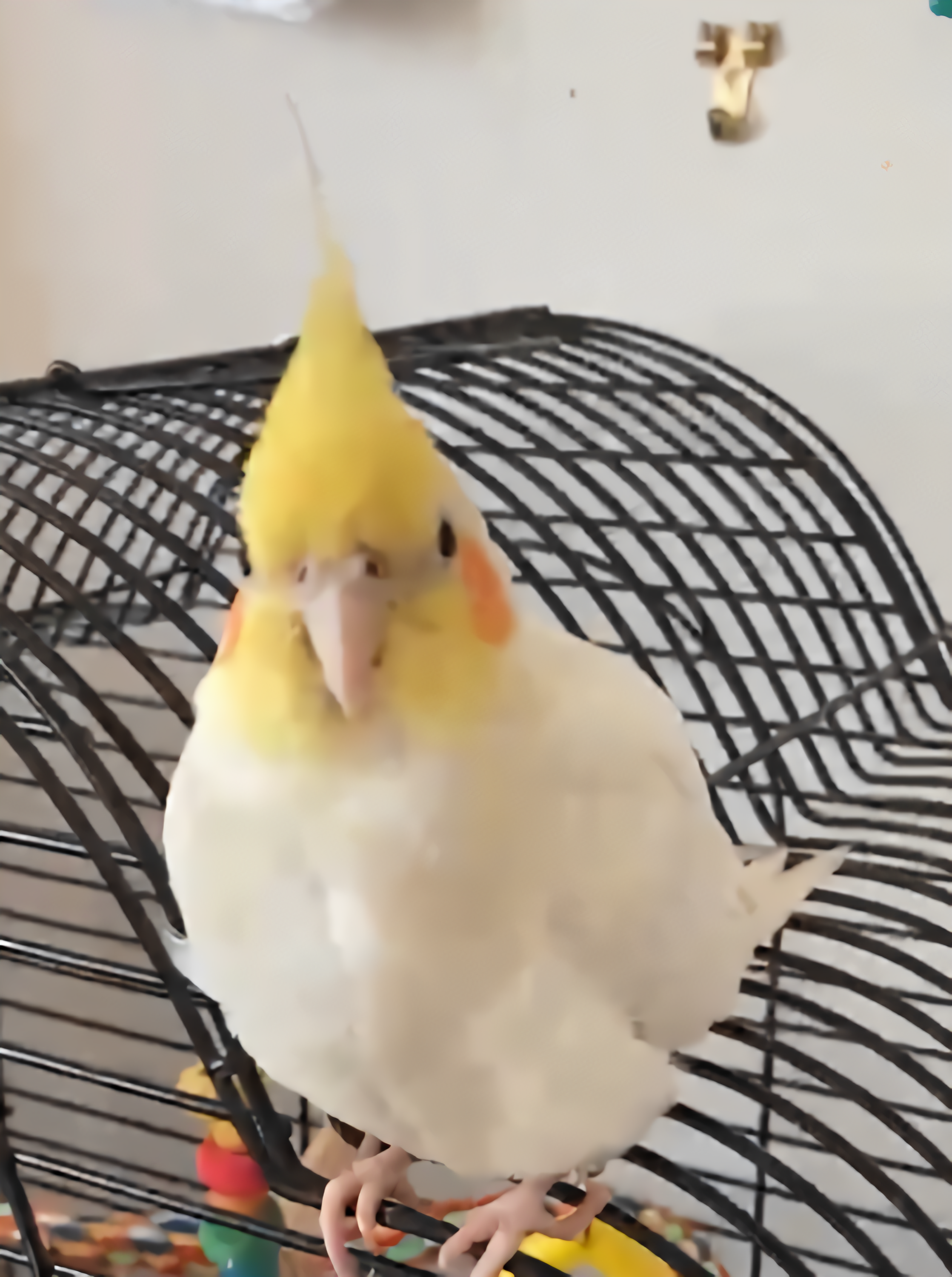
1.5 year old male lutino cockatiel

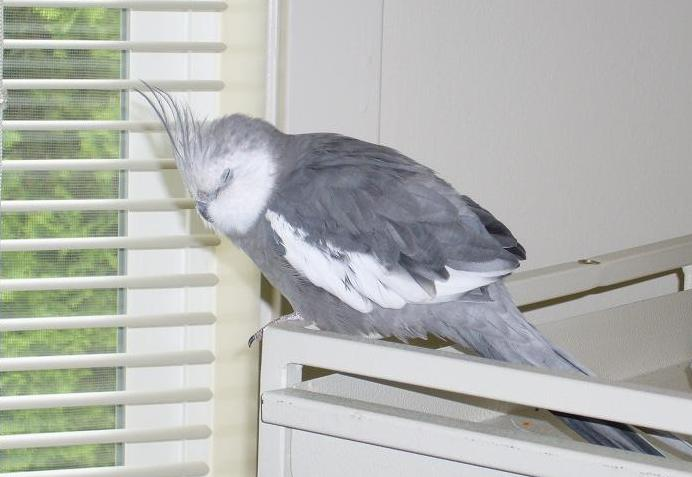
A male white-faced cockatiel resting

=== Breeding and life span ===
Breeding is triggered by seasonal rainfall. Cockatiels nest in tree hollows near a source of fresh water, often choosing eucalyptus/gum trees. The hen lays 4-7 eggs, one every other day, which she incubates for 17–23 days. The chicks fledge after 5 weeks. Cockatiels are the only cockatoo species which may reproduce by the end of their first year. These birds breed easily in captivity when provided a nest box and increased hours of light, either artificial or natural.

The cockatiel's average life span is 12 to 15 years, though in captivity and under appropriate living conditions, a cockatiel could be expected to live from 16 to 25 years. The oldest living and confirmed specimen of cockatiel was reportedly 36 years old.

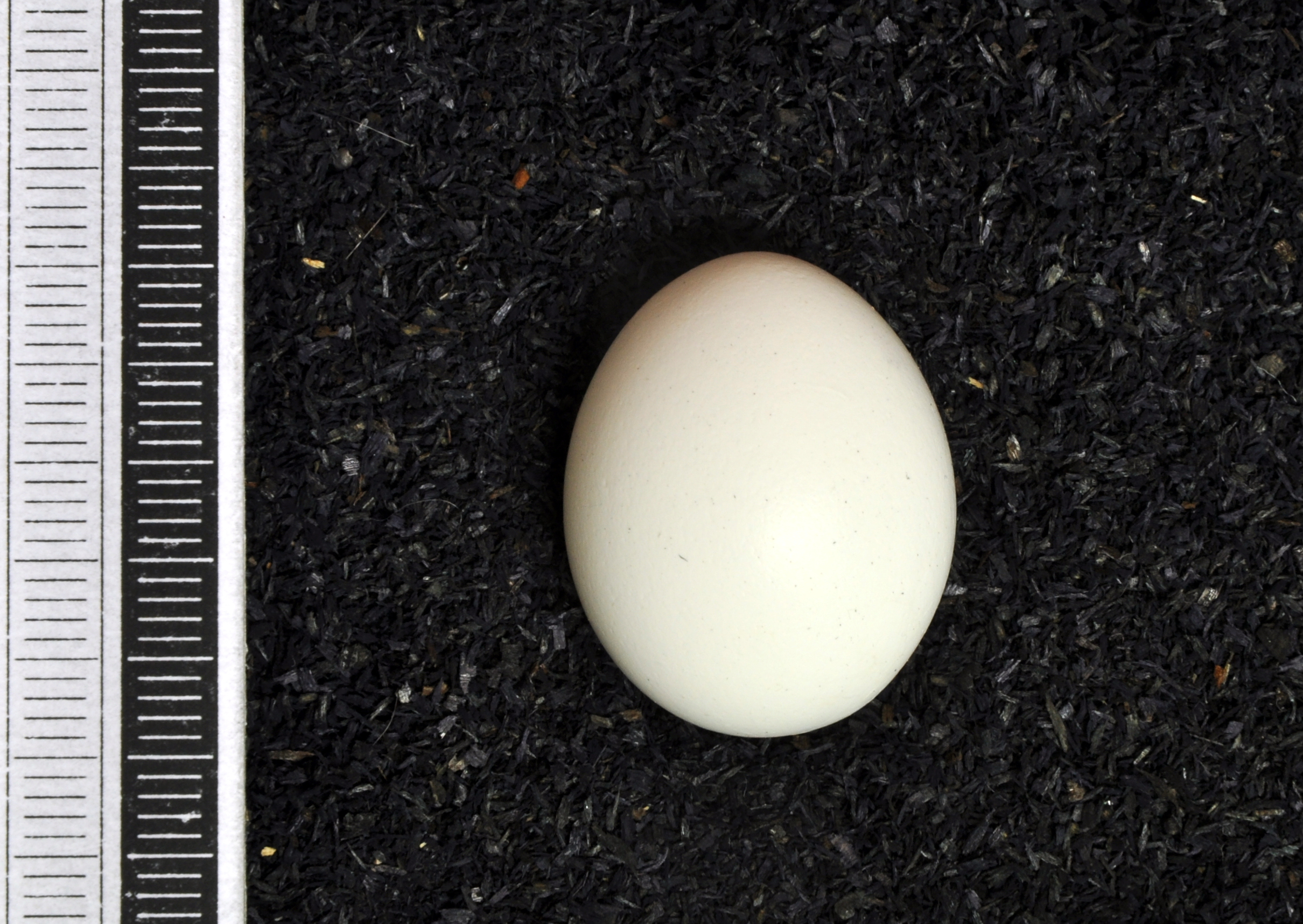
Egg, Collection Museum Wiesbaden

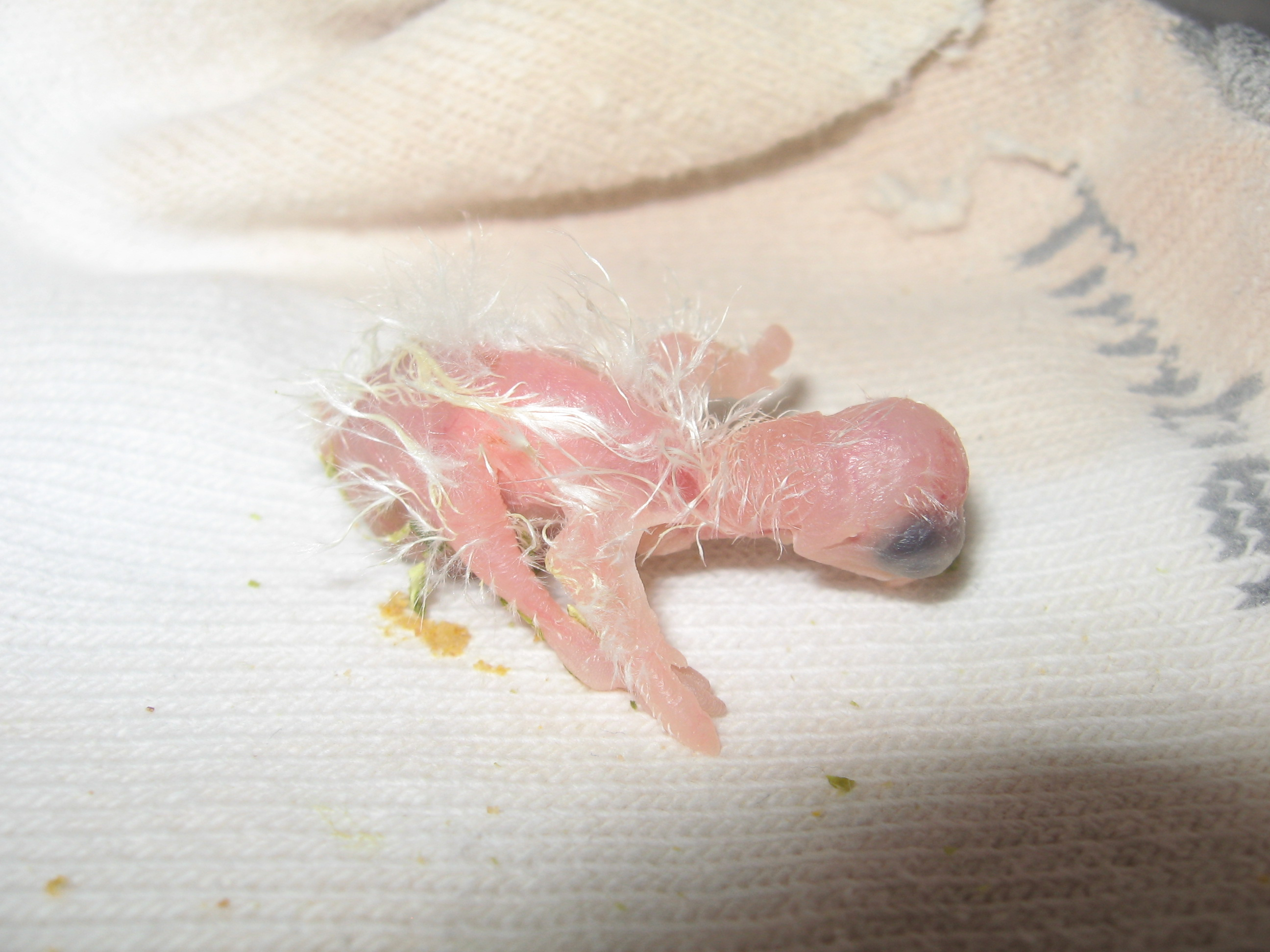
One-day-old cockatiel chick

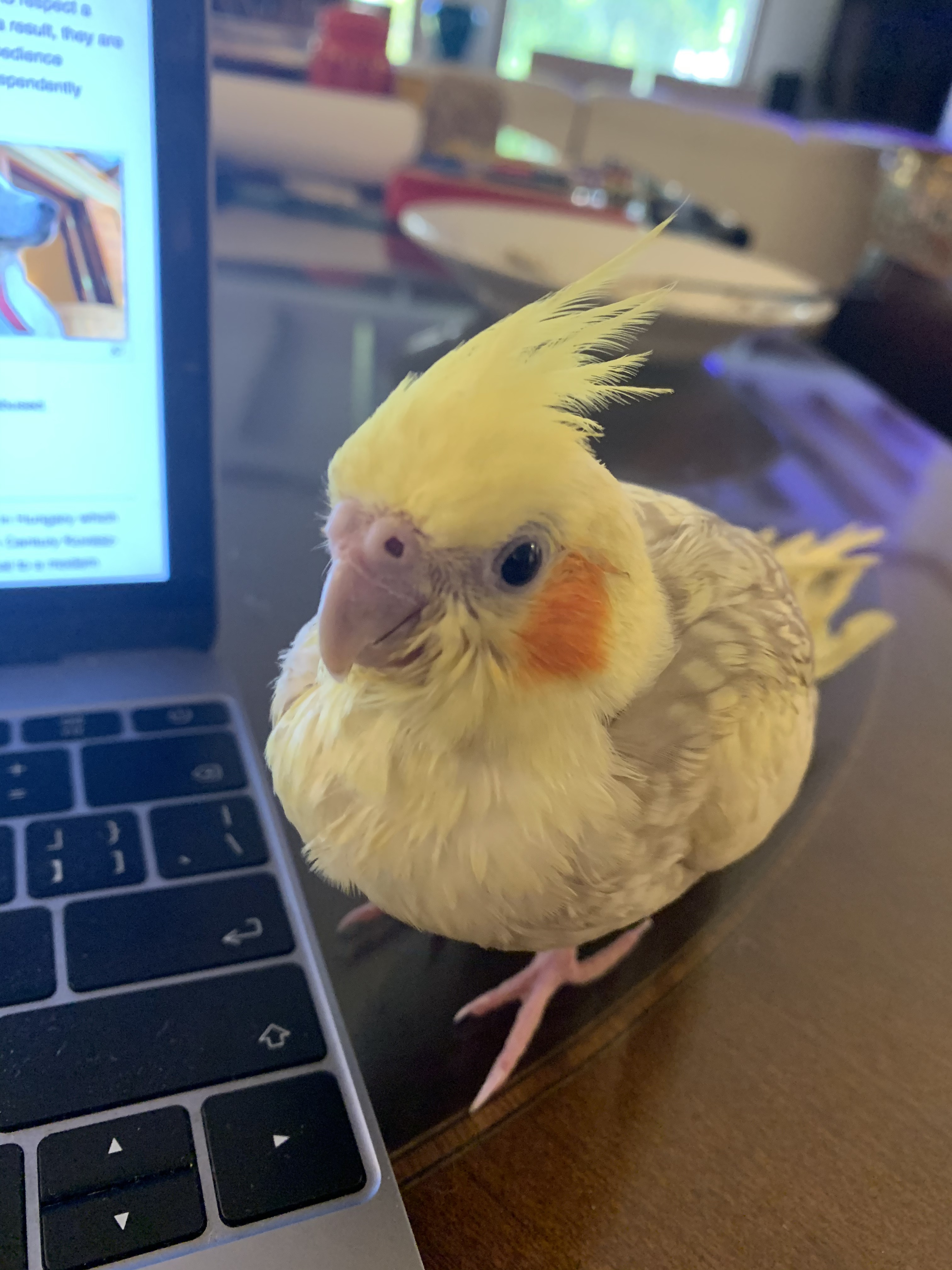
Young fledged cockatiel

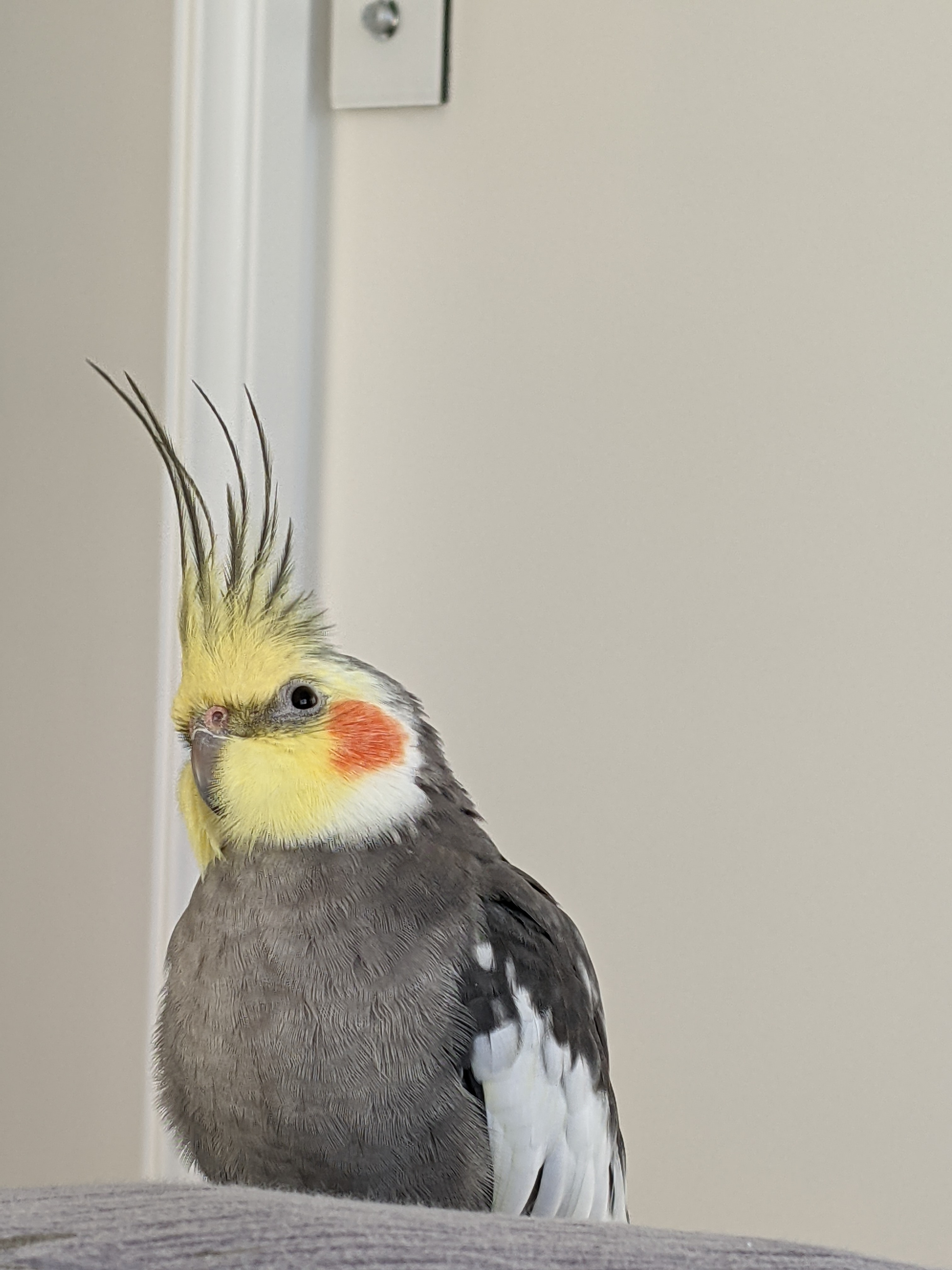
4.5-year-old male cockatiel

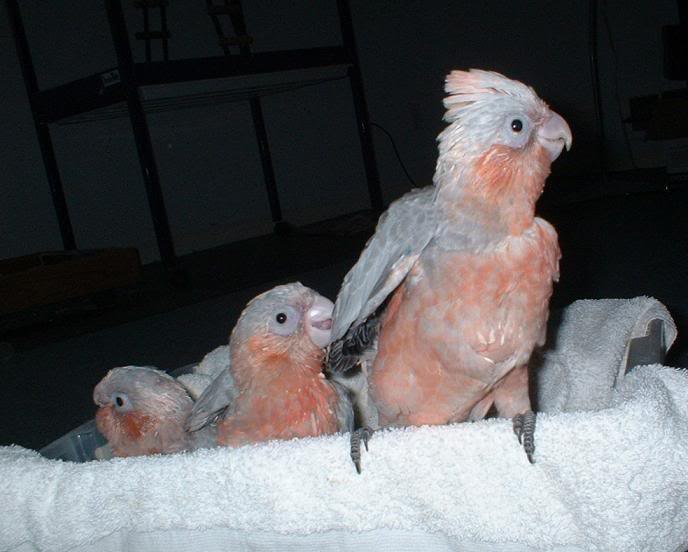
Three juvenile 'galatiels' (N. hollandicus x E. roseicapilla), a hybrid between a cockatiel and a galah

== Speech and vocalization ==
Cockatiels can be very vocal and learn many spoken words and phrases by mimicking. Usually, males are faster to learn speech, mimicking or singing; their calls are also more varied.

Cockatiels can also be taught to sing specific melodies, to the extent that some cockatiels have been demonstrated to synchronise their melodies with the songs of humans. Others have independently learned to mimic household sounds, including alarm clocks, phones, tunes or other birds from the outdoors.

== See also ==
- Normal grey cockatiel
- Cockatiel colour genetics
- Companion parrot
- Pied cockatiel
- Lutino cockatiel
- Budgerigar
- White-faced cockatiel
- Cockatoo
- Bronze Fallow Cockatiel
