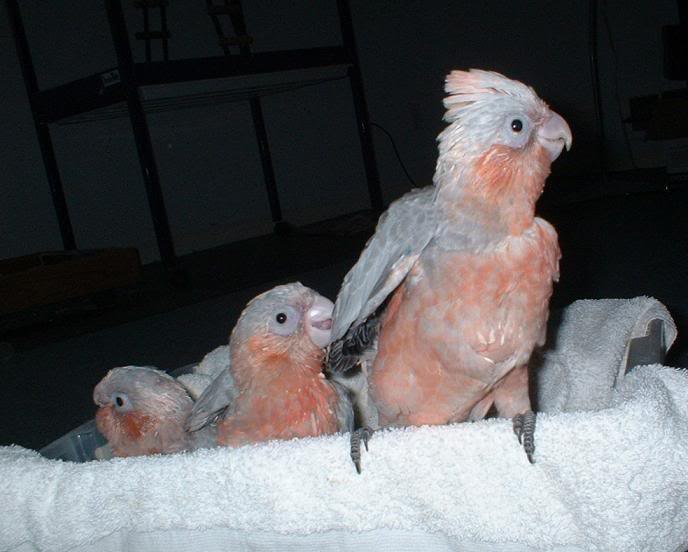
- Juvenile galatiels

Scientific classification
- Kingdom: Animalia
- Phylum: Chordata
- Class: Aves
- Order: Psittaciformes
- Family: Cacatuidae
- Hybrid: Nymphicus hollandicus × Eolophus roseicapilla

= Galatiel =

Hybrid of a galah and cockatiel

The galatiel or galahtiel is an extremely rare hybrid of a cockatiel and galah.

== Characteristics ==
Galatiels have been described as around 25 percent larger than a cockatiel. They are usually grey colored with pink or slightly orange accents and have a slightly shorter crest compared to a cockatiel. They suffer from various skeletal deformities and have been described as sterile.

== See also ==
- Cockatiel
- Galah
