= Normal grey cockatiel =

Wild type of cockatiel

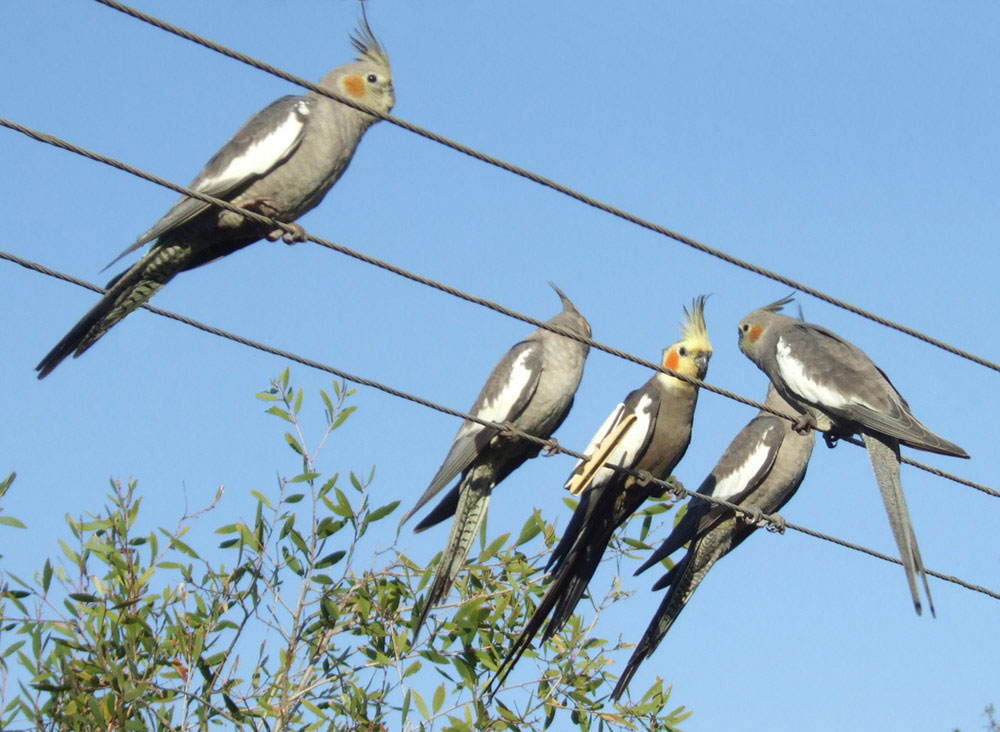
Wild cockatiels in Australia

The normal grey cockatiel, wild type cockatiel, wild cockatiel or grey cockatiel, or Common Cockatiel, is the origin cockatiel of all colour genetics mutations, with mostly grey feathers and orange cheek patches.

== Colour mutation ==
It all began with the normal grey cockatiel as the wild type colour, the mutations started with the captive home breeding, It took about 100 years for the first mutation to evolve, from the first captive breeding of cockatiels which was in France in the 1850s till 1951 which known the Pied cockatiel mutation as first mutation colour to be established in the United States. The Pied appeared exactly by the aviaries of "Mr. D. Putman" of San Diego, California, United States.

A mutation is defined as a spontaneous change in the genetic code. These changes have resulted in the different colors we now have today. All cockatiels, excluding the normal grey are mutations.

Cockatiel colour mutations have produced the Lutino cockatiel, which first appeared in 1958 (see cockatiel colour genetics).

The White-faced cockatiel first appeared in 1964.

Other varieties include Cinnamon cockatiel, the Pearled cockatiel which appeared in Germany in 1967 or 1968, and Pastelface cockatiel.

== Sound ==
All cockatiel colour genetic mutations produce the same call.

== See also ==
- Cockatoo
- Lutino rosy-faced lovebird mutation
- Cockatiel colour genetics
- Companion parrot
- Pied cockatiel
- Lutino cockatiel
- Budgerigar
- White-faced cockatiel
