= Pied cockatiel =

Variety of cockatiel

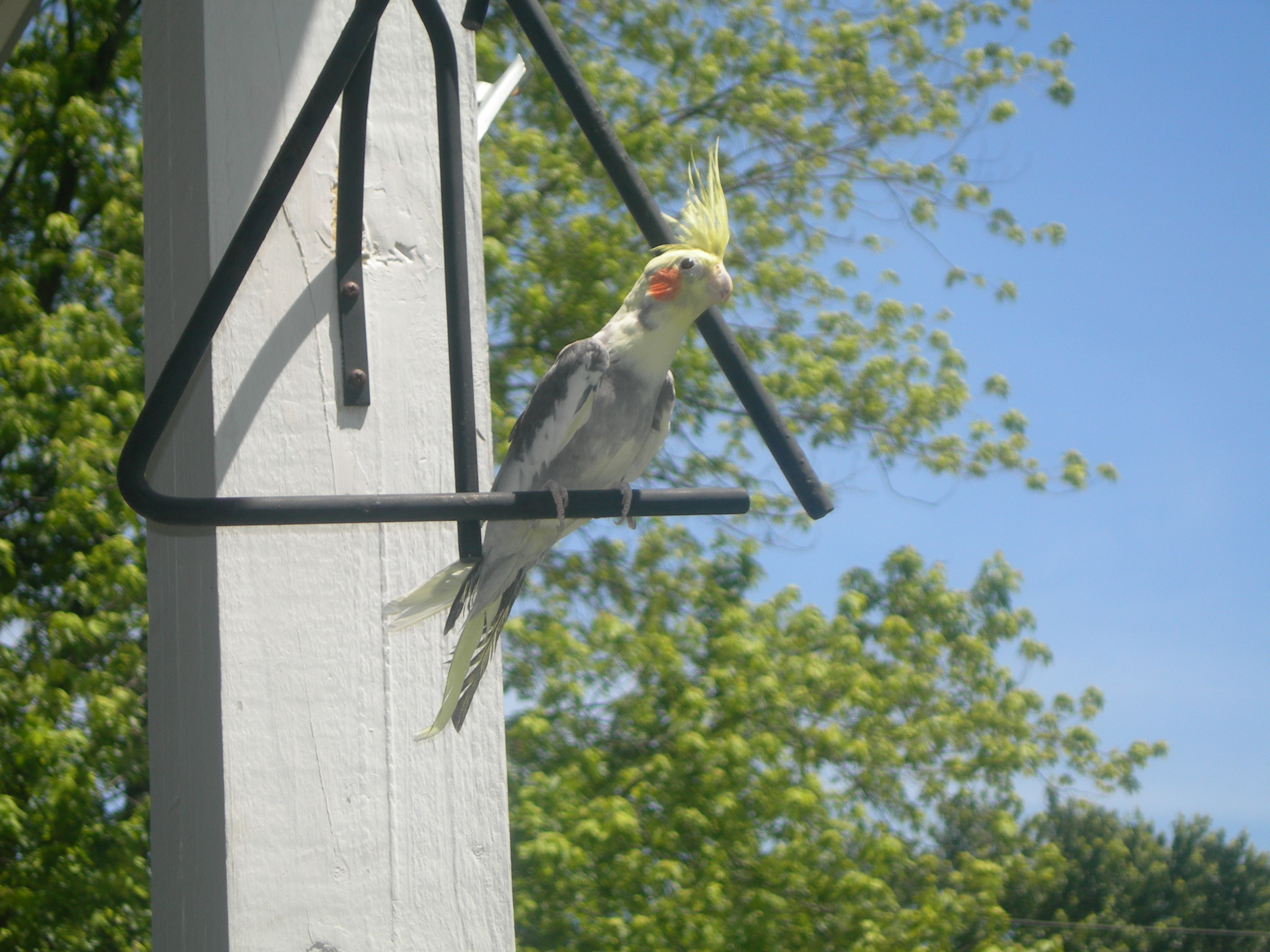

The Pied cockatiel is the first mutation of cockatiel colour genetics, with a mostly grey to light-yellow and white feathers and orange cheek patches.

Pied cockatiels have large, random blotches of colour on their bodies, after the "normal grey" or "wild type" of a cockatiel's plumage is primarily grey with prominent white flashes on the outer edges of each wing.

Bird breeders can breed for certain traits, and they have been breeding for different colour mutations in cockatiels since the 1940s.

The pied cockatiel mutation was the first cockatiel mutation colour to be established in United States in 1951. The Pied appeared exactly by the aviaries of "Mr. D. Putman" of San Diego, California, United States.

After this first genetic colour mutation the cockatiel bird Knew a series of mutations like Lutino cockatiel as second cockatiel colour genetics, first appeared in 1958, White-faced cockatiel (first appeared in 1964), Cinnamon cockatiel, and the Pearled cockatiel which appeared in Germany in 1967 or 1968 and Pastelface cockatiel.

== Heavy pied vs Light pied cockatiel ==
There are two kinds of pied cockatiel colour mutation in this mutation,"Heavy Pied cockatiels" and "Light Pied cockatiels". the difference between Heavy Pied cockatiel and Light Pied cockatiels, a Light Pied cockatiel should have 10% pied colour (any less and they could indeed be split pied) and a Heavy Pied cockatiel should have more than 75% pied colour. there are many variations of pieds from just a few pied flights and body feathers to a bird that is predominately yellow (or white) with just a few dark feathers, which is sometimes referred to as a "reverse" or "saddleback" pied.

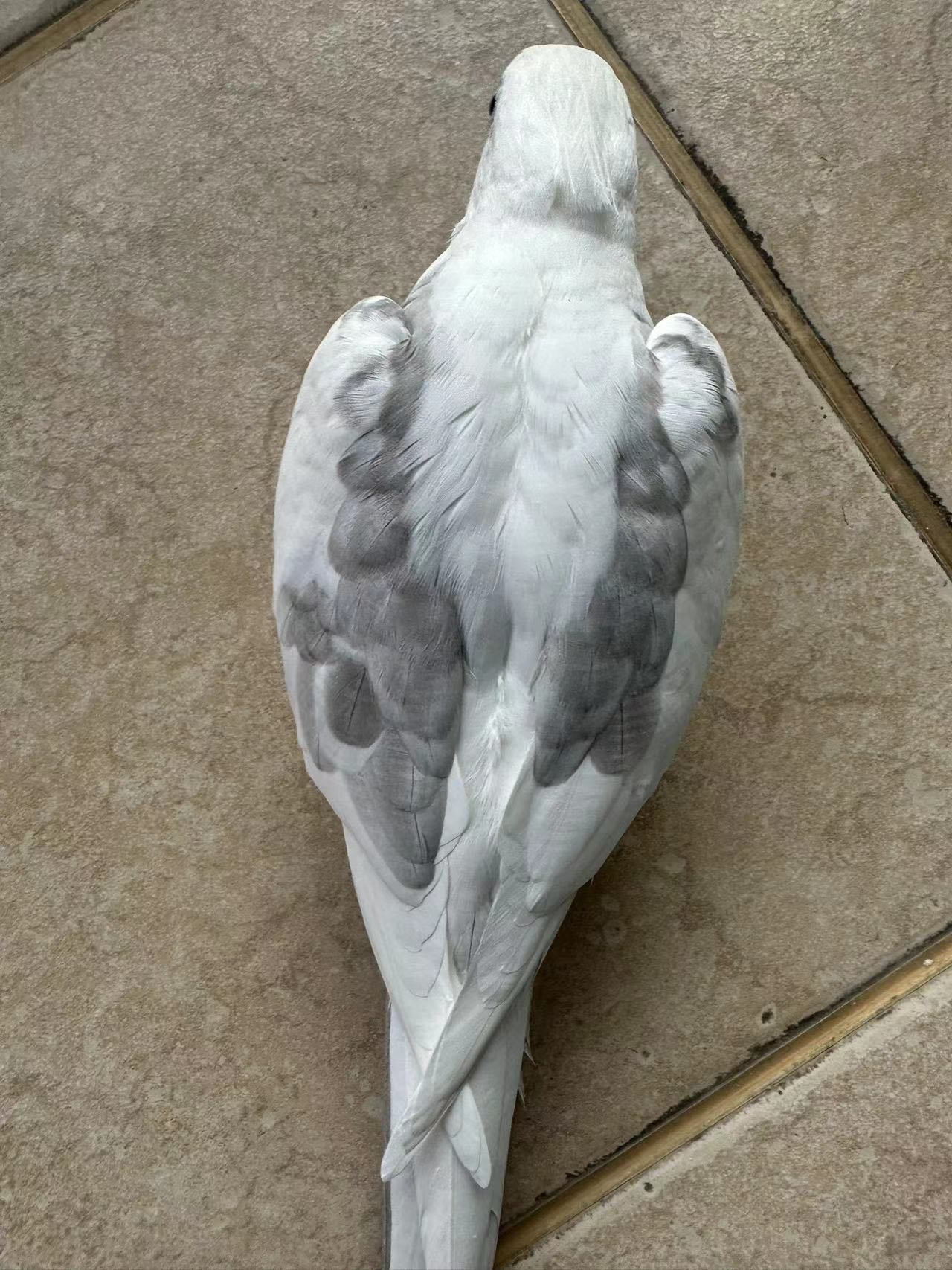
A whiteface heavy pied cockatiel's back.

if a pied has no dark feathers or 1-2 dark feathers on the face, chest or rump it is referred to as a "clear pied". Clear pieds can often be mistaken for a lutino, the difference between a clear pied and lutino is in their eyes. Lutino's eyes will reflect light back red in both the pupil and the iris, a clear pied will have black pupil and brown iris (if the bird is also cinnamon the pupil will be wine colour while the iris remains brown)

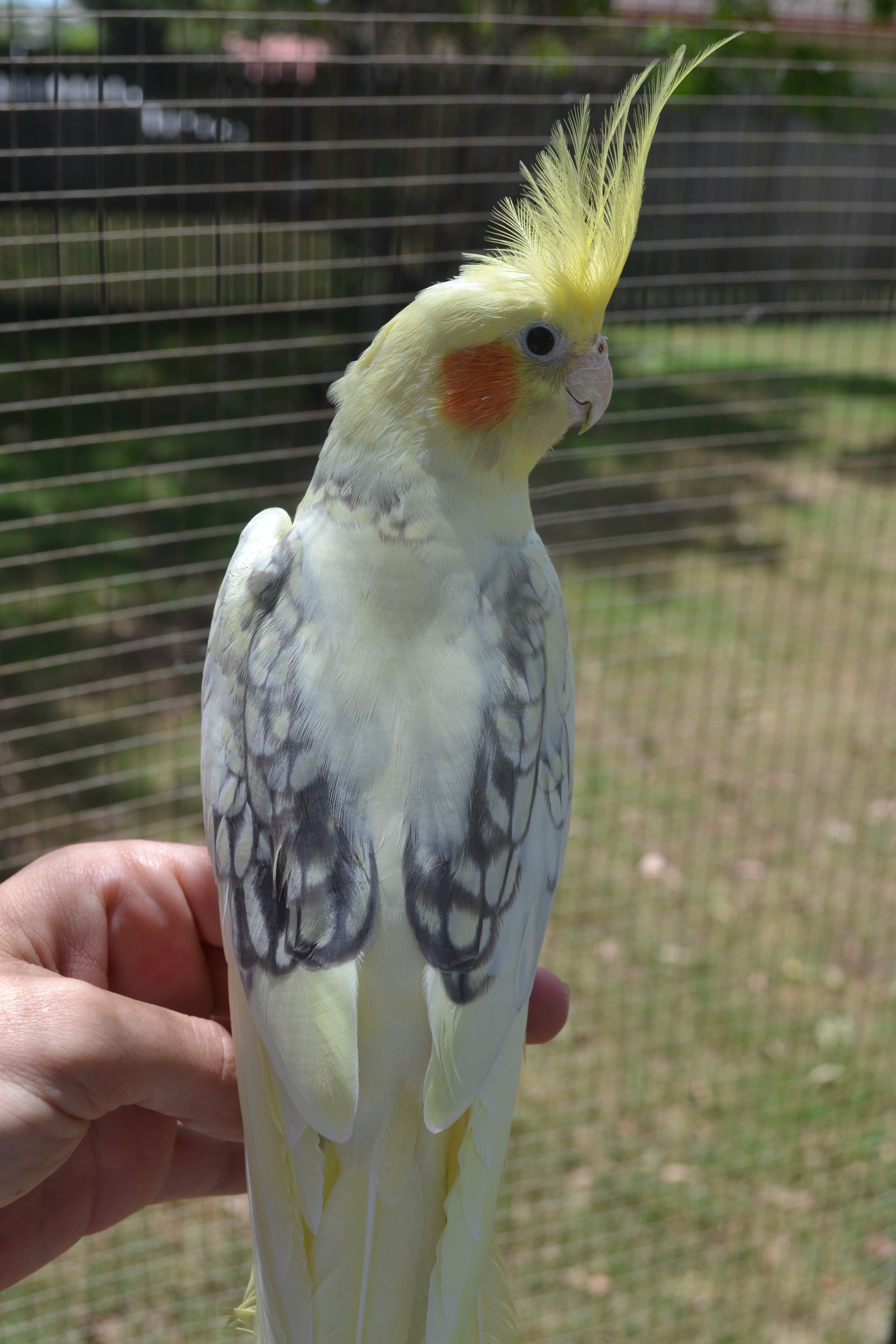
Pearl pied

== Size and weight ==
This bird gets up to 12 inches (30 cm) and weighs 3 to 4 ounces.

== Sound ==
All cockatiel colour genetic mutations have the same Tweet.

== See also ==
- Lutino cockatiel
- Cockatiel
- Cockatoo
- Companion parrot
- Lutino rosy-faced lovebird mutation
- Normal grey cockatiel
- White-faced cockatiel
