= Lutino cockatiel =

Variety of cockatiel

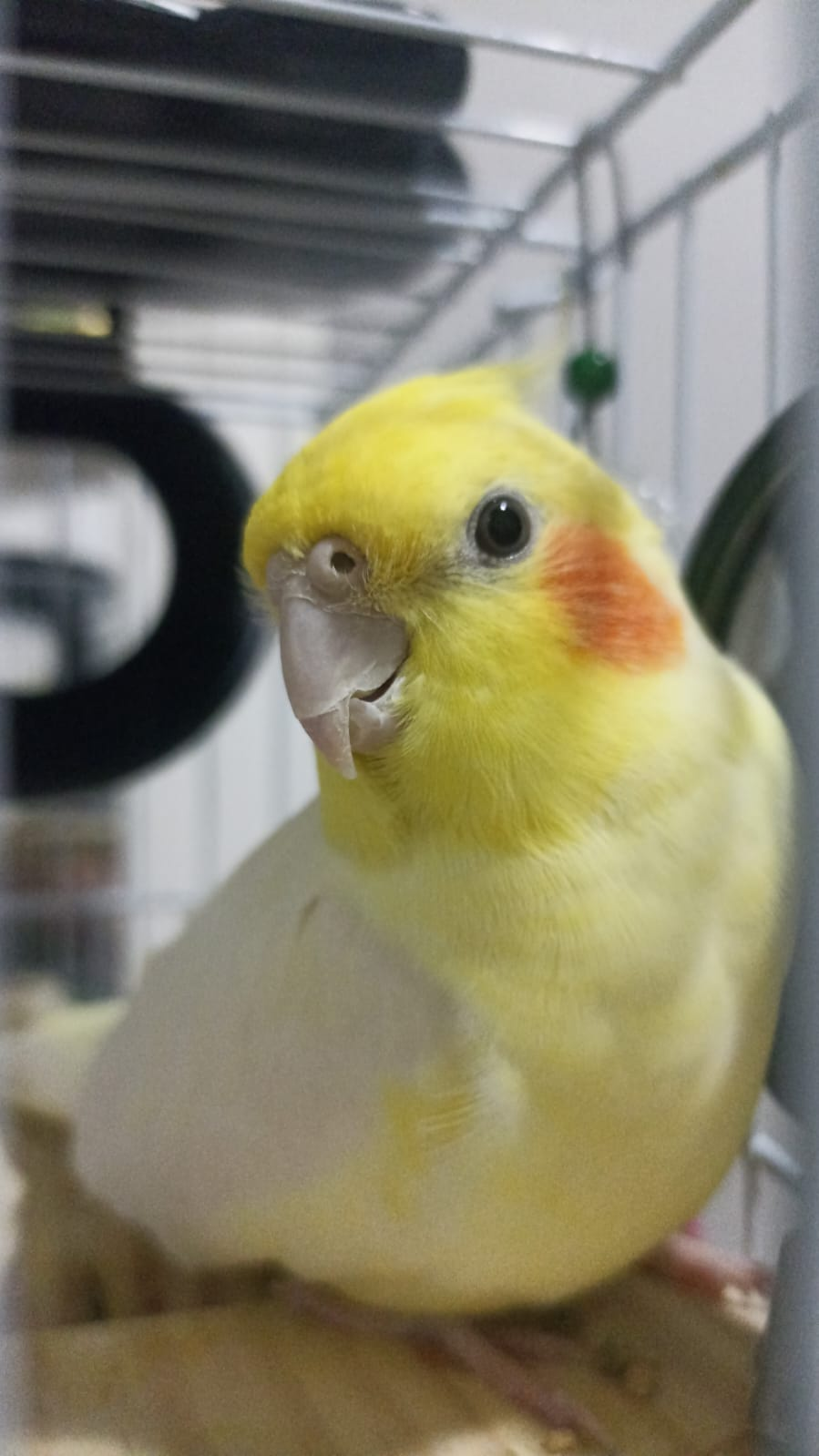
A female lutino cockatiel

The lutino cockatiel is one of the most popular mutations of cockatiel, with white to light-yellow feathers and orange/red cheek patches.

The "normal grey" or "wild type" of a cockatiel's plumage is primarily grey with prominent white flashes on the outer edges of each wing.

However, bird breeders can breed for certain traits, and they have been breeding for different color mutations in cockatiels since the 1940s.

The lutino cockatiel mutation was the second cockatiel mutation to be established in the United States, the first being the pied cockatiel mutation in 1951.

The lutino appeared in the aviaries of Cliff Barringer of Miami, Florida, United States, in 1958.

== Genetics ==
Cockatiels use the ZW sex-determination system. In a simplified form, lutino is determined by a single recessive Z-linked allele. Male lutinos are of genotype $Z^b/Z^b$, and female lutinos are of genotype $Z^b/W$. A lutino male crossed with a wild-type female would result in lutino females and wild-type heterozygous males, as shown in the Punnett square.

Punnett square
| | $Z^B$ | $W$ |
| $Z^b$ | $Z^B/Z^b$ | $Z^b/W$ |
| $Z^b$ | $Z^B/Z^b$ | $Z^b/W$ |

== Sound and appearance ==
All cockatiel colour genetic mutations have the same calls. The male lutino cockatiels can talk, sing, and dance (shakes head, makes the wings heart-shaped, etc.) to attract female cockatiels. Lutino cockatiels appear as full body in color yellow with two orange circular spots around the ear and cheek area.

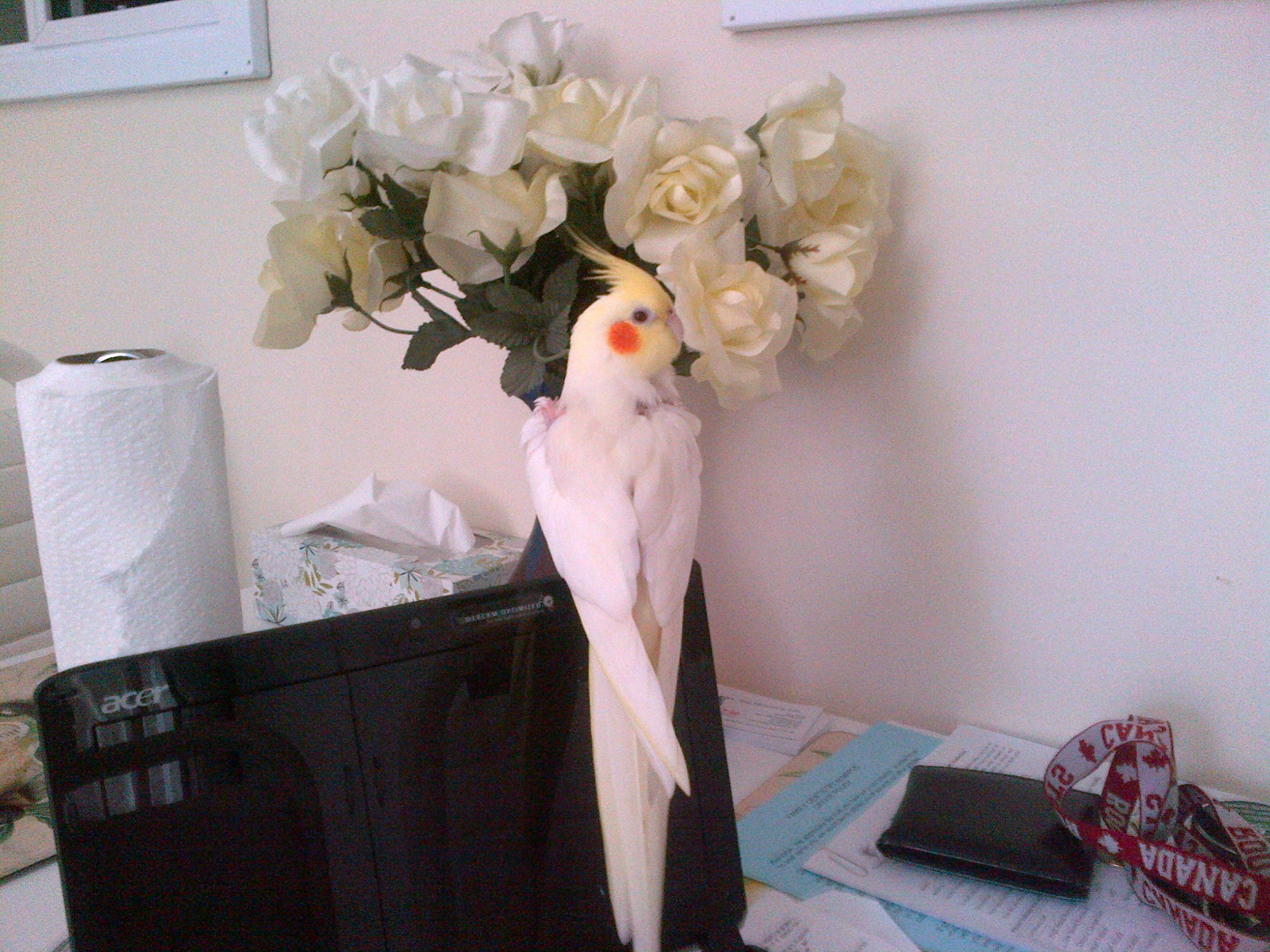
Female lutino cockatiel

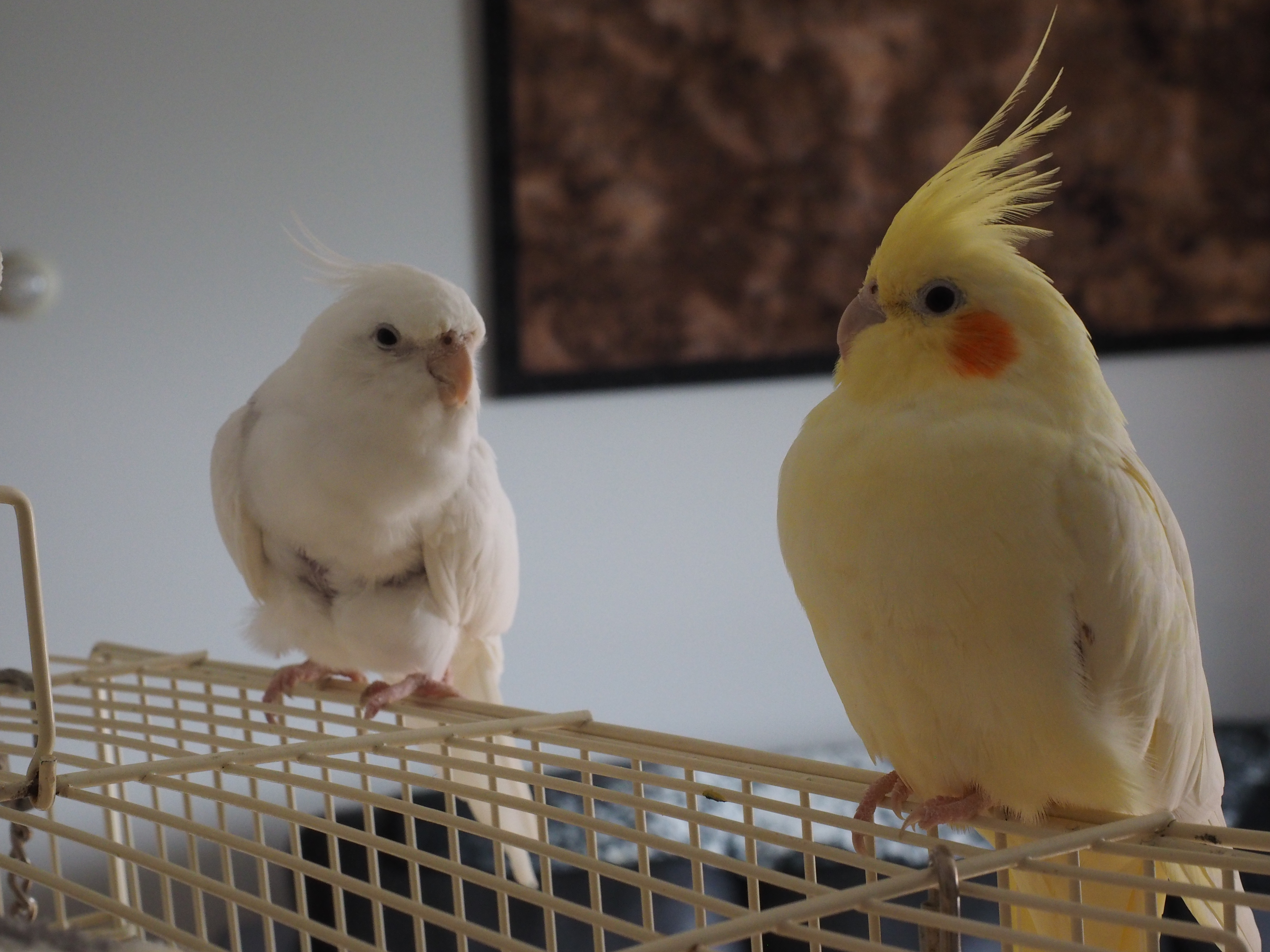
Lutino cockatiel (on right)

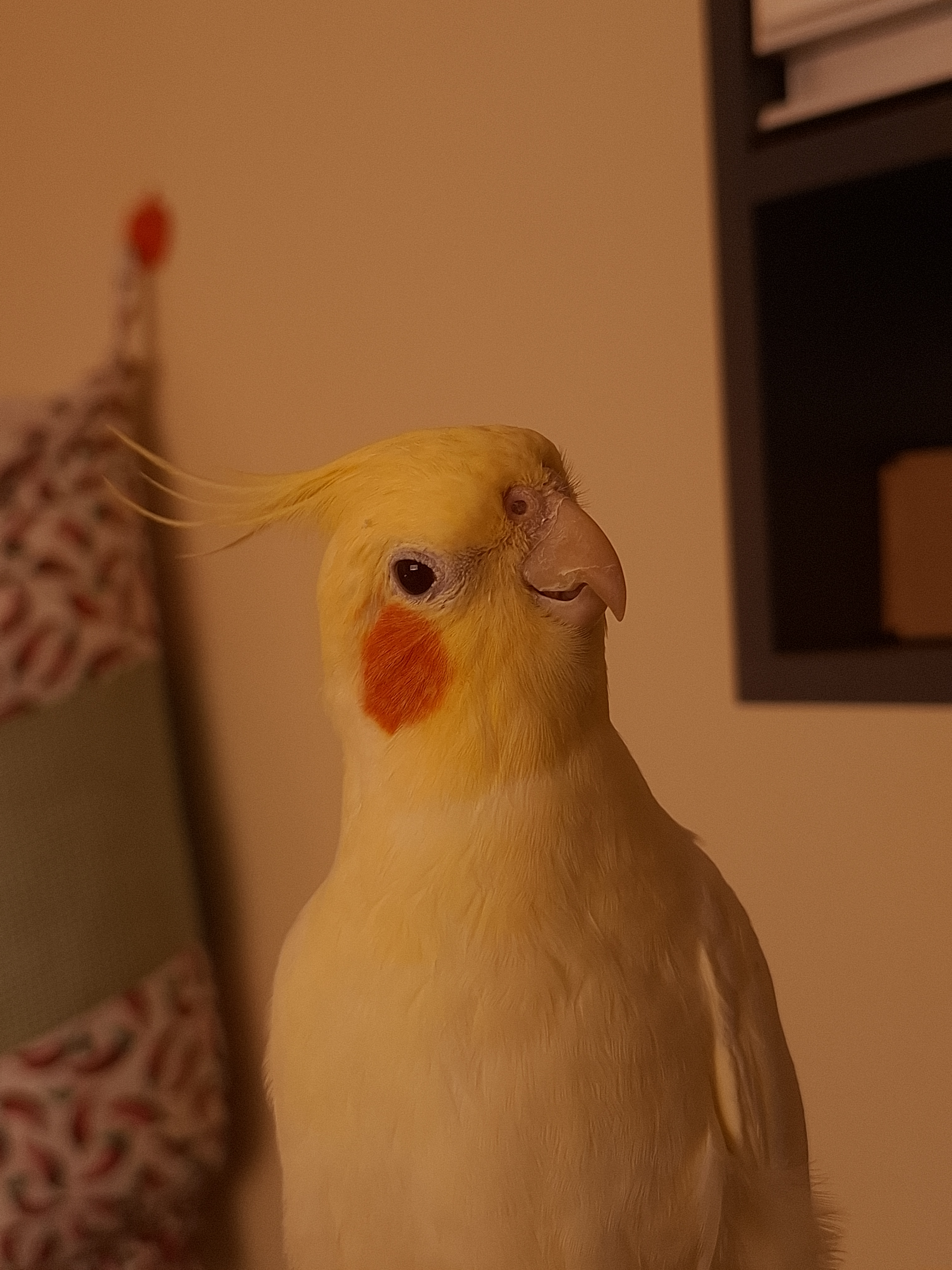
Lutino Cockatiel front view

== Relation with "albino" cockatiel ==
The "albino" cockatiel also known as the whiteface lutino, is not the result of albinism. It is a breed that combines two genes of whiteface and lutino. The "Whiteface gene" removes all the yellow and orange that would be present in a Lutino, and the "Lutino gene" removes all the black and grey. So it has all white plumage, red eyes and pink feet. It is quite rare because of its all white plumage. The male and female of albino cannot be distinguished from their appearance, but need to be distinguished from their behavior or call.

== Lutino-pearl cockatiel ==
The lutino-pearl cockatiel is a composite product of the lutino cockatiel and the pearl cockatiel. It has the appearance of a lutino cockatiel with yellow spots on its body.

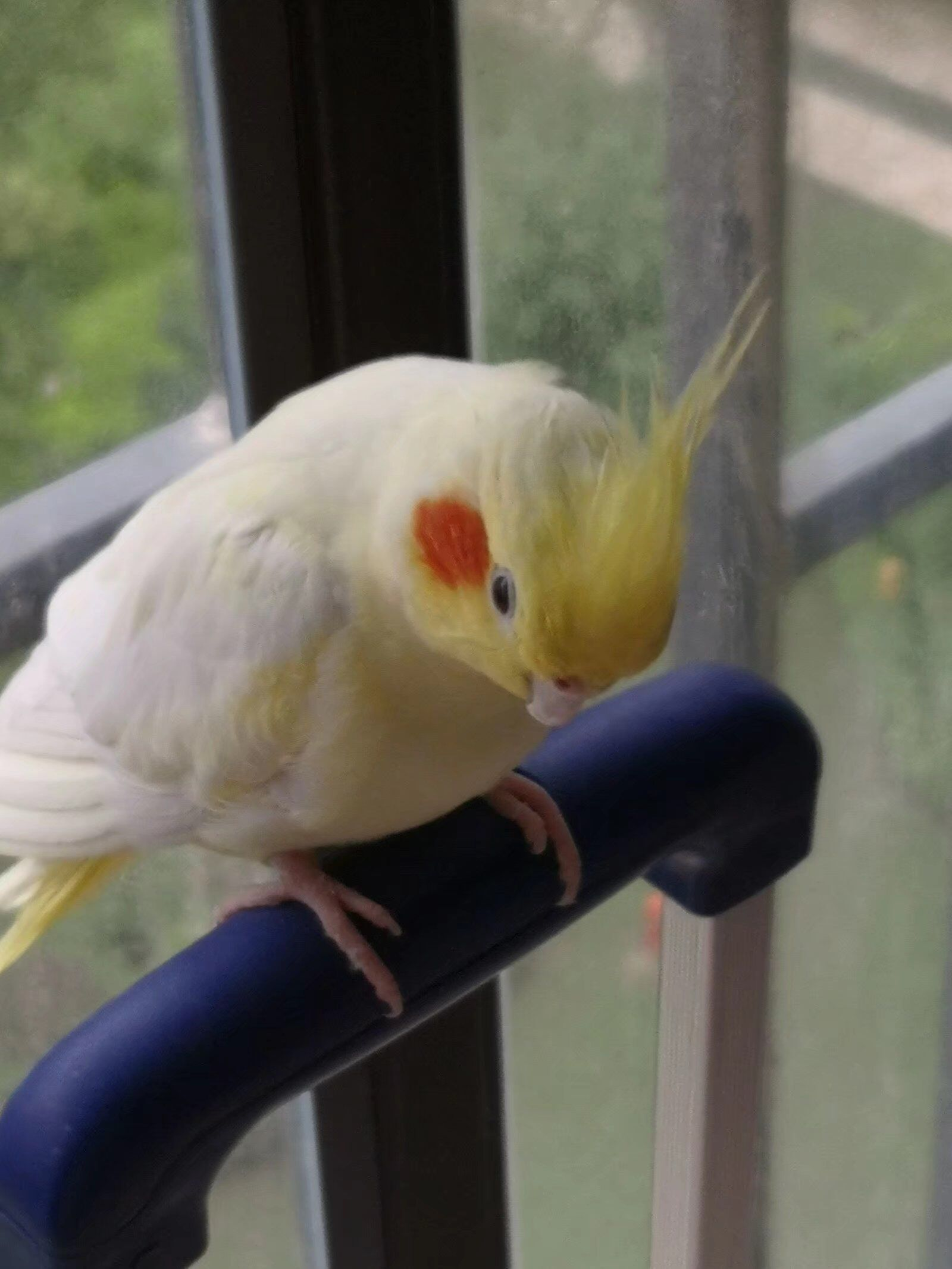
A female lutino-pearl cockatiel

== See also ==
- Lutino rosy-faced lovebird mutation
- Cockatiel
- Cockatoo
- Companion parrot
- Pied cockatiel
