= White-faced cockatiel =

One of the cockatiel colour genetic mutations with a mostly white or grayish face

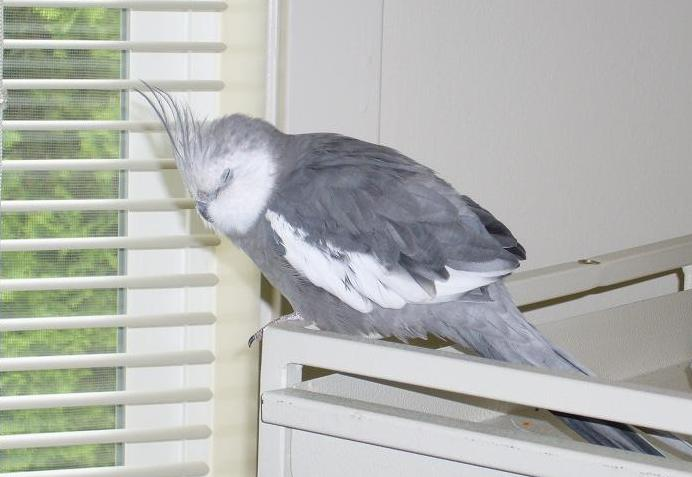
A male white-faced cockatiel sleeping

The white-faced cockatiel is one of the cockatiel colour genetic mutations, with a mostly white or grayish face. They stand out because they have no orange cheek patches or yellow coloring at all. This is the seventh established mutation which appeared for the first time with domesticated cockatiels in 1964 in Holland.

== Size and weight ==
These cockatiels can grow up to 12 inches (30 cm) and weigh 3 to 4 ounces.

== Sexual differences ==
For white-faced cockatiels, the males will have a whiter head and the females will have more of a grayish head. The females will also have the barred markings underneath their tail feathers while the males will have none.

== White-faced cockatiel in different colour mutations ==
- White-faced grey cockatiel:
- White-faced pearl cockatiel:
- White-faced pied cockatiel:
- White-faced pearl pied cockatiel:
- White-faced cinnamon cockatiel:
- White-faced cinnamon pearl cockatiel:
- White-faced cinnamon pied cockatiel:

=== The relation with "albino" cockatiel ===
The "albino cockatiel" is not a true albino, it is a combination of a "white-faced cockatiel" and a "Lutino cockatiel". The "Whiteface gene" removes all the yellow and orange that would be present in a Lutino. and the "Lutino gene" removes all the black and grey. The result is an all white cockatiel with red eyes. In some cases a whiteface lutino can be nest sexed via the parents mutations, in instances where the parents mutations are unknown they are impossible to sex visually, so you will need a DNA test to determine what sex your pet is.

== Sound ==
All cockatiel colour genetic mutations have the same tweet.

== See also ==
- Lutino rosy-faced lovebird mutation
- cockatiel
- cockatoo
- Companion parrot
- Pied cockatiel
- Lutino cockatiel
- Normal grey cockatiel
