= Cockatiel colour genetics =

Colour variation in cockatiels

The science of cockatiel colour genetics deals with the heredity of colour variation in the feathers of cockatiels, Nymphicus hollandicus. Colour mutations are a natural but very rare phenomenon that occur in either captivity or the wild. About fifteen primary colour mutations have been established in the species which enable the production of many different combinations. Note that this article is heavily based on the captive or companion cockatiel rather than the wild cockatiel species.

== Mutations (list) ==
- Anti-Dimorphic (ADM) Pied/Recessive Pied
- Ashenfallow, incorrectly known as either Recessive Silver and/or Silver Fallow in the past
- Bronzefallow/Brownfallow
- Cinnamon
- Dilute, incorrectly known as Pastel Silver in the past
- Dominant Silver/Ashen Dilute
- Edgedilute, incorrectly known as Spangled Silver in the past
- Faded
- Sex-linked Ino/Lutino/Albino
- Palefaced Ino/Creamino
- Non-sex-linked ino/Recessive Ino
- Opaline/Pearl
- Palefaced, often incorrectly known as Pastelfaced
- Pallid, often incorrectly known as Platinum
- White-faced
- Dominant Yellowcheeks
- Sex-linked Yellowcheeks
- Yellow-suffusion, incorrectly known as Emerald and/or Olive

Cockatiels started with a normal grey colour, and then mutations began popping up because of specific breeding. The first mutations that occurred were pieds, cinnamons, Lutinos and pearls. The next mutations to occur were white-faces, silvers and albinos. Recently, an orange-crested cock with orange cheek patches extending into the face and crest has occurred; this is a newly discovered mutation.

== Normal grey (non-mutated) ==
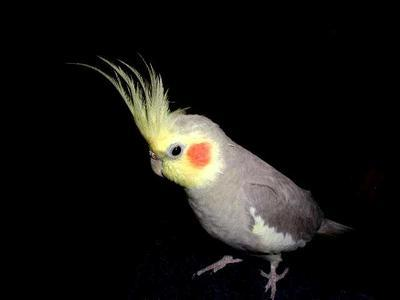
A perfect example of a normal grey cockatiel.

The normal grey or wild-type cockatiel is one whose colour genes have no mutations. A normal grey cockatiel's plumage is primarily grey with prominent white flashes on the outer edges of each wing. The face of the male is yellow or white, while the face of the female is primarily grey or light grey, and both genders feature a round orange area on both ear areas, often referred to as "cheek patches". This orange colouration is generally vibrant in adult males, and often quite muted in females and young cockatiels. Visual sexing is often possible with this variant of bird. A normal grey cockatiel with some white or yellow feathers on the back of their head is split to the recessive mutation Pied.

== White-faced ==
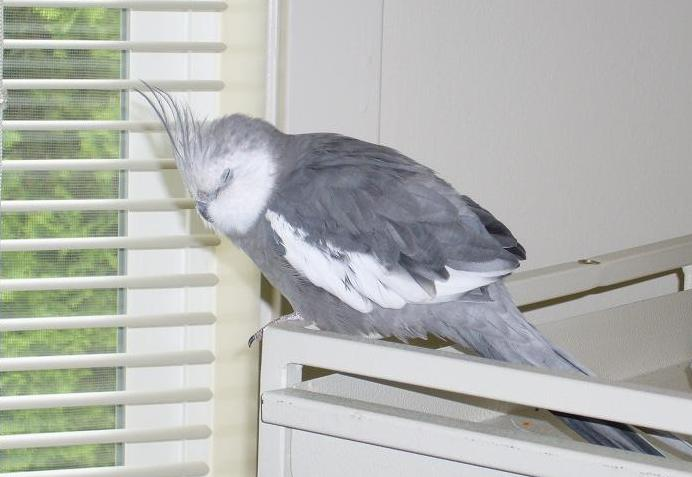
A white-faced cockatiel (sleeping)

White-faced cockatiels have their psittacofulvin (yellow and orange) pigments deactivated by the blue gene, resulting in cockatiels with absolutely no psittacofulvin pigments whatsoever. This is a result of the same genetic mutation as the genuine Blue genetic mutation in all typical parrot and parakeet species. Consequently, White-faced cockatiels are mainly grey with more or less white throughout their plumage. White-faced cocks display brilliant white faces while hens display basically grey faces with some white streaks. With the availability of the Whiteface mutation, the cockatiel's wide colour varieties are divided into 2 main classes (or series):

1. Yellow base: with psittacofulvin (yellow and orange) pigments.
2. White base: without psittacofulvin pigments

Some white-faced cockatiels have entirely white bodies and red eyes. Albino isn't entirely correct terminology, although they are sometimes referred to as such. Albino animals have the Blue genetic mutation, but cockatiels do not have the Blue gene. The more appropriate name for this mutation would be the White-faced Lutino.

== Lutino ==
The Lutino sex-linked recessive mutation is a perfect example of a type of cockatiel that are the hardest to sex visually. Lutinos lack eumelanin pigment (enabling black, brown, grey colours and tones) and are consequently yellow to yellowish-white with orange cheek-patches. Adult female Lutinos as well as immature Lutinos of both sexes display yellow bars, dots and/or stripes on the underside of their tail feathers. Mature males, however, can be sexed visually by their always displaying solid white coloured undersides of tail feathers.

Unfortunately, a good number of cockatiels of all Lutino mutations and varieties, such as Pale-faced Lutino and Opaline Lutino, are affected with a transmittable genetic flaw. This flaw enlarges the bald spot below the crest, due to irresponsible and excessive in-breeding and a general lack of effort, ethics, and responsibility in breeders to breed it out. Breeders who have been working on reducing the bald patch have been greatly successful in reducing its size.

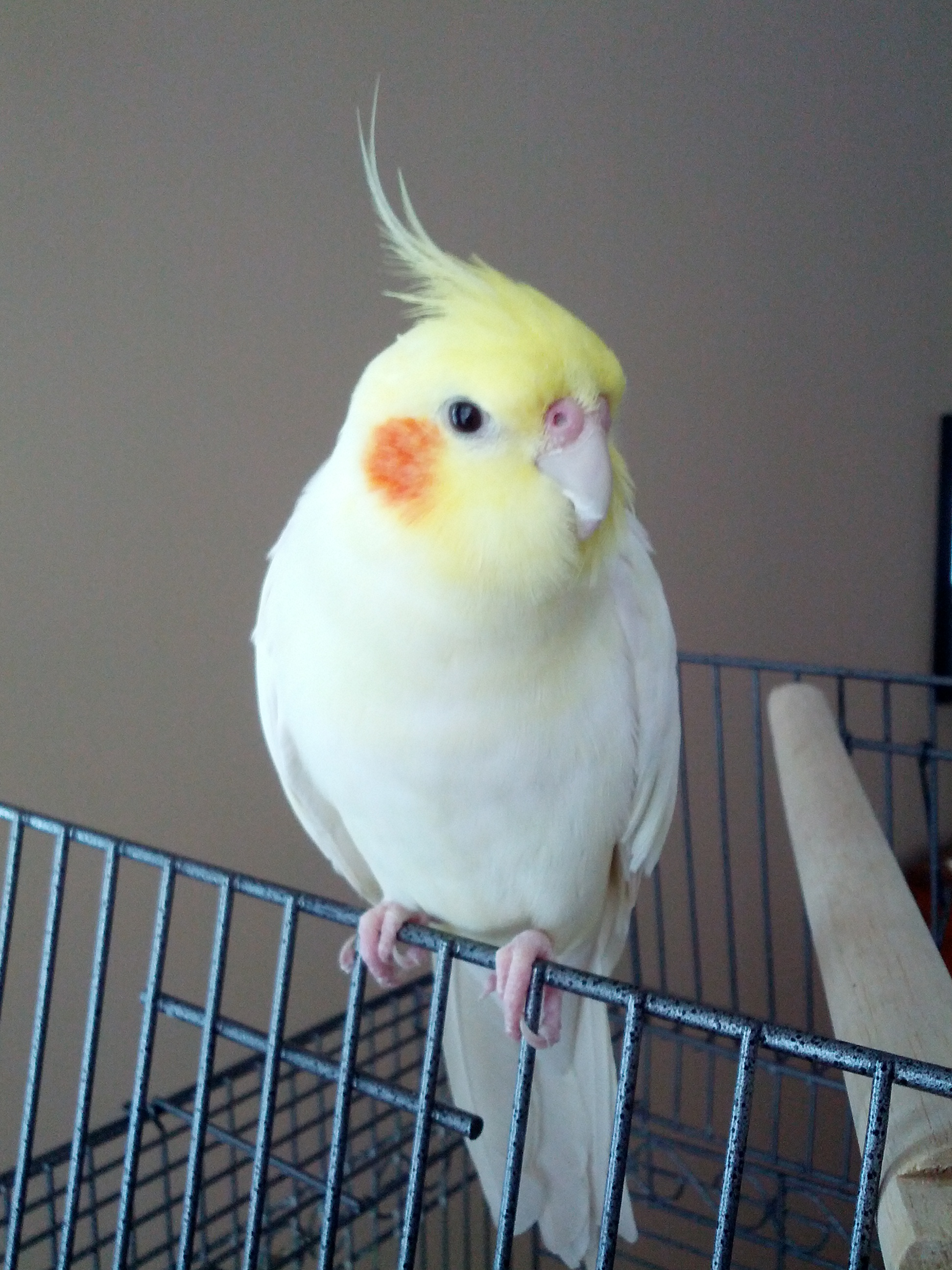
A pet lutino cockatiel. Note the lack of dark pigment, including in the beak, eyes, feathering, feet, skin and toenails.

== Pied ==
Pied cockatiel plumage patterns vary significantly between one individual to another, giving rise to cockatiel breeders and hobbyists' "Heavy Pied" and "Light Pied" distinctions. Unfortunately, the degree in piedness remains genetically unpredictable. However, breeding heavily pied specimens together generally produces a higher percentage of heavily pied offspring than breeding lesser pied specimens together. Ultimately, the "Pied" mutation causes the bird to lack a majority of the typical grey plumage on the breast, belly, and head. Thus "Pied" cockatiels are characterized by the degree of their yellow or yellow-white colouring in these areas. Last but not least, there are the exceptional Clear-pied individuals that are solid yellowish-white or solid white just like Lutino and/or albino but with normal blackish eyes and out of ADMpied (recessive pied) parentage.

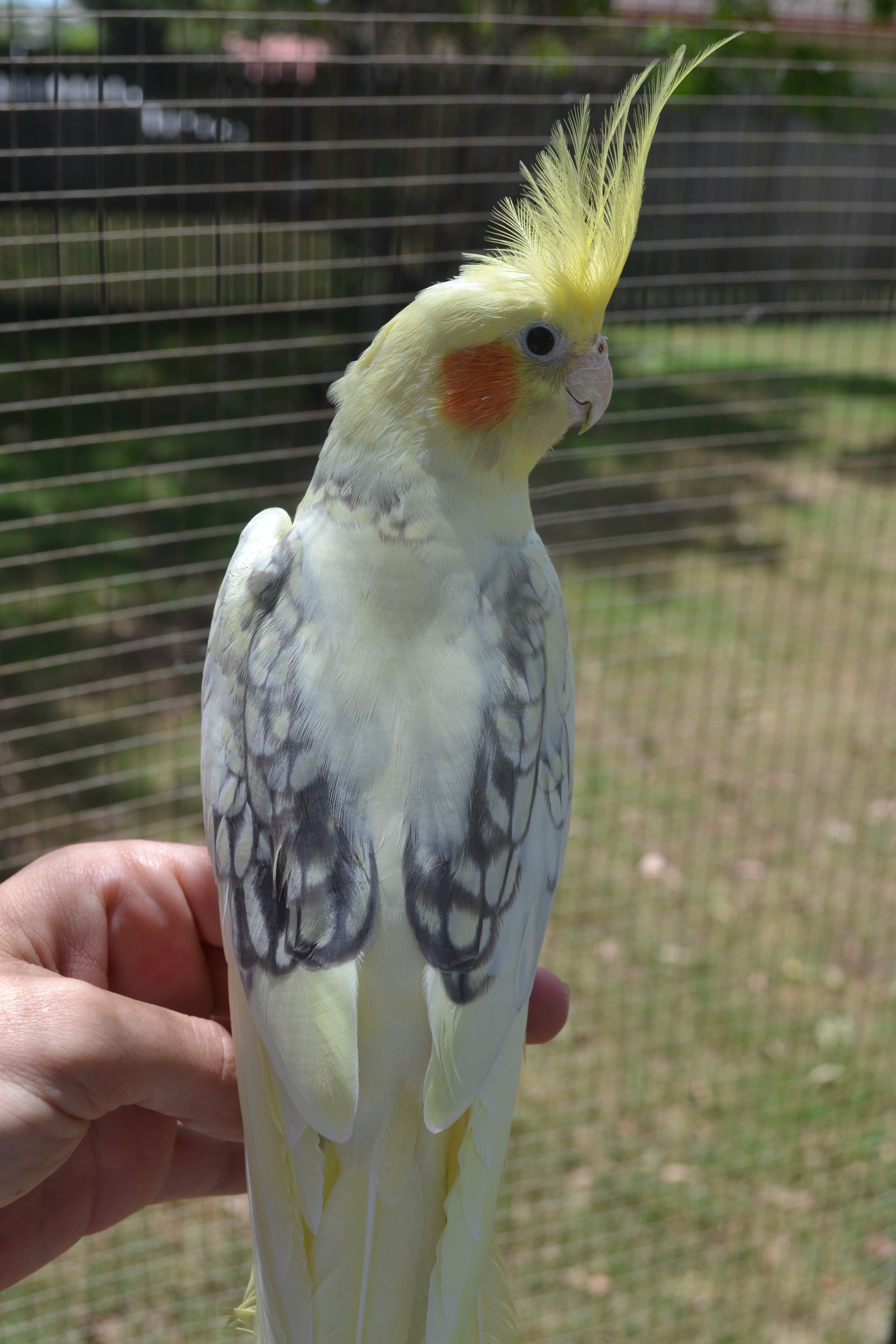
A pearl-pied cockatiel.

Throughout parrot species, the ADMpied gene negates the male's ability to display his species' dimorphic features. This leads to ADMpied cockatiels being notoriously difficult to sex visually but being excellent examples for studies in genetic traits. However, in monomorphic species (i.e. conures, lovebirds, macaws, rosellas, etc.) the anti-dimorphic feature cannot be expressed while piedness still is. Therefore, Pied specimens of these species are called either Recessive Pied and/or Harlequin in budgerigar.

== Cinnamons and pearls ==
Cinnamon and pearl mutations are sex-linked recessive. In Cinnamons, the eumelanin pigment are partially oxidized. Eumelanin granules are stopped at the brown stage of their development to end up in their natural black colour state. They have a speckled complexion, with white spots on their secondary feathers and deep brown on their primaries.

The pearl cockatiels' gene does not have any visual effect on the colour pigments in the bird but instead, it affects the distribution of the colours that are already present. It actually decreases the spread of the grey family of pigments (melanin) and increases the spread of the yellow pigments (psittacofulvin). Individual feathers over most of a Pearled bird will have more of the yellow family of pigments visible, giving them a scalloped pattern.

Males do not retain the pearled colouring, but lose it soon after their first molt. Though this pattern may not be visible, it is not essentially gone, but is just covered up by more grey pigment.

== Combined mutations ==
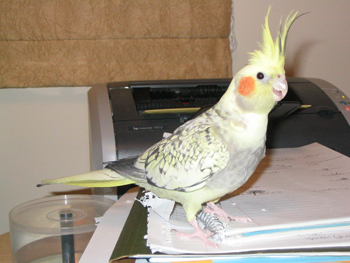
Cockatiel specimen combining the opaline and ADMpied mutations.

There are a tremendous number of colour varieties (combined mutations), including ADMpied Cinnamon, White-faced Lutino, Opaline Cinnamon, Creamino, White-faced Cinnamon, White-faced Opaline.

Mutations can appear both individually or in a wide variety of combinations such as albino, Pearled Lutino, White-faced Pied, and Opaline-Cinnamon. Still fairly hard to find is the rather new yellow-suffusion mutation. Cockatiels do not actually have green pigment in their plumage, thus yellow-suffusion specimens don't either. The yellow suffusion combined with underlying black (or pure brown in Cinnamon specimens) pigmentation produces an illusion of greenish tones giving rise to the genetically incorrect common names of Emerald for this trait.

== Other features ==
Many mutations retain the normal features (black eyes, grey beak, grey feet/skin, and black toenails) of wild-type (grey) cockatiels. However, Fallow and Lutino mutations have pink to red eyes, pink feet/skin, white-tipped clear (pink) toenails and pinkish-white beaks. Also, Cinnamon specimens look quite essentially alike wild-type (a.k.a. normal grey) specimens, with the exception of being pure-brown and hatching with wine-red eyes (which turn to brown between 5–15 days of age) and displaying dark brown eyes in adulthood.

Sex-linked mutations such as Cinnamon, Lutino, Opaline, Pallid and/or sex-linked Yellowcheeks have a higher ratio of female to male offspring due to the mode of inheritance.

== Sexing without sexual dimorphism ==
As mentioned above, some mutations don't allow sexing by their feather patterns. This is because some mutations don't vary between males and females. One method of sexing cockatiels involves checking their pelvic bones. This idea is similar to how human pelvic bones differ, where females have wider hips to allow for childbirth; female cockatiels can have wider and more flexible pelvic bones to account for egg laying. This method isn't always accurate when genes cause females to have a narrower pelvis.

Another way to sex cockatiels is by their behaviour. Males tend to be more vocal and also have an easier time mimicking noises. Males also sometimes "strut". This behaviour is categorized by sticking their chest out and parading around, sometimes pacing, typically accompanied by whistling. Females are usually quiet and they're more likely to hiss and bite.

== See also ==
- Companion parrot
