= Red-suffusion rosy-faced lovebird mutation =

The red-suffusion rose-faced lovebird (Agapornis roseicollis), also known as the red-pied lovebird, is not a true colour mutation of lovebird species. Many breeders believe it is due to a health issue, most likely dealing with the bird's liver. Some think the red-pied has some genetic relations with the Lutino rosy-faced lovebird mutation, as many cases of red spots appear in Lutino lovebirds. Although many breeders of parrots have claimed that this is a genetic mutation, no one has been able to successfully reproduce it through a series of generations.

== See also ==
- Rosy-faced lovebird
- Rosy-faced lovebird colour genetics
