= Lutino =

Lutino is a bird that exhibits a yellow pigmentation known as xanthochromism. It may refer to:

- Lutino budgies
- Lutino cockatiel mutation
- Lutino rosy-faced lovebird mutation
