= Rosy-faced lovebird colour genetics =

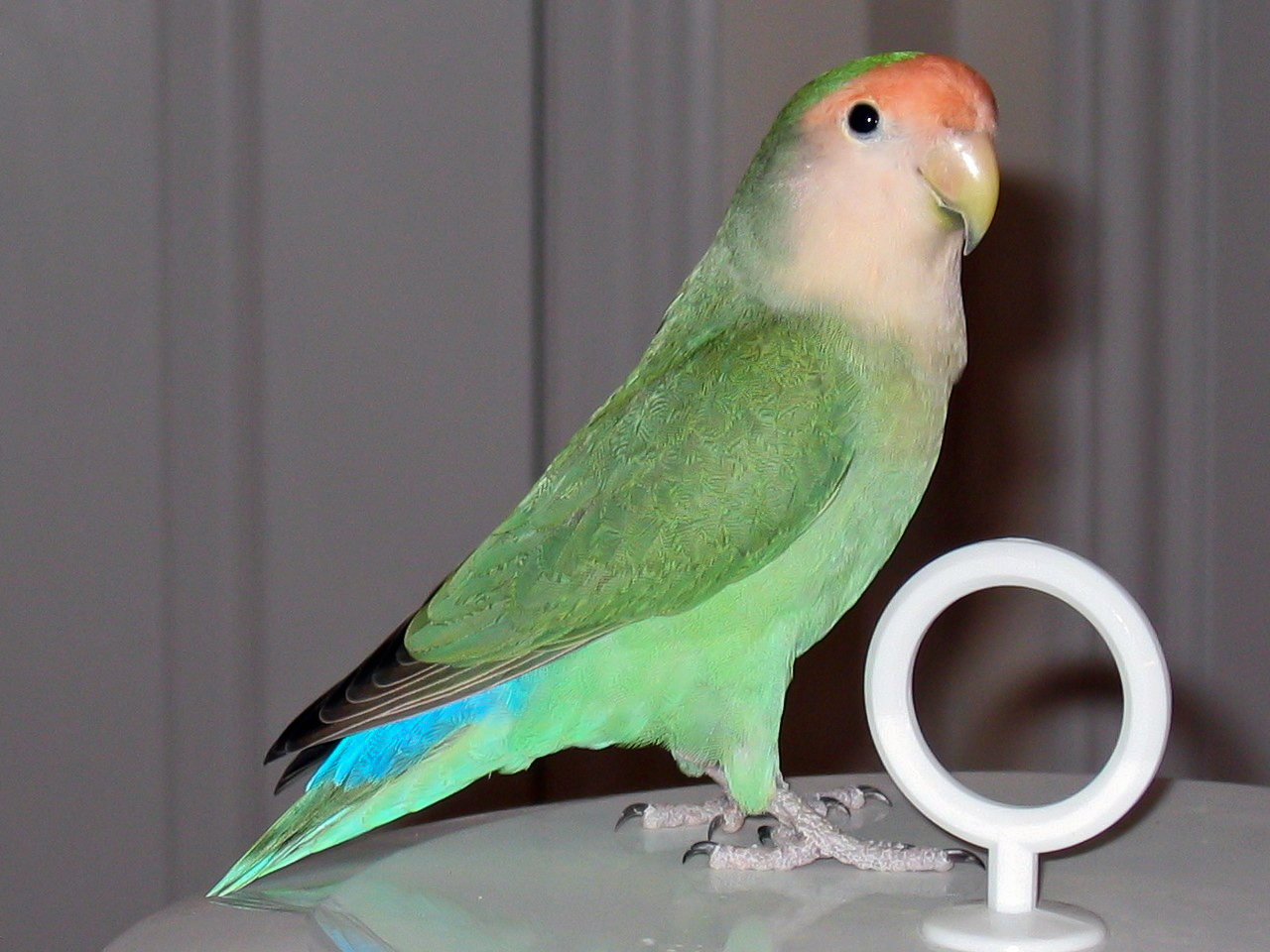
Seagreen (also known as AquaTurquoise in the European parlance)

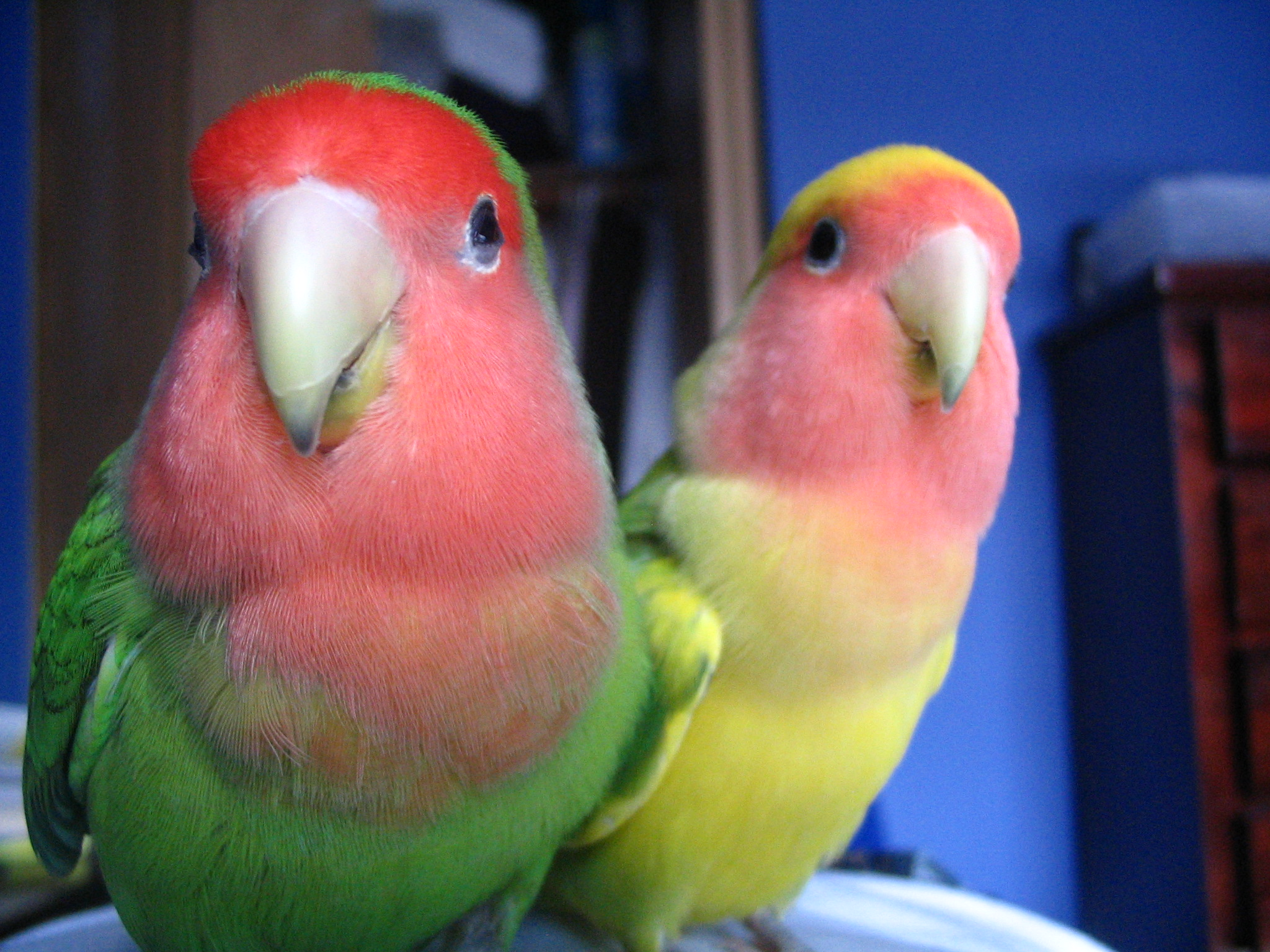
Wild Green and Pied Wild Green

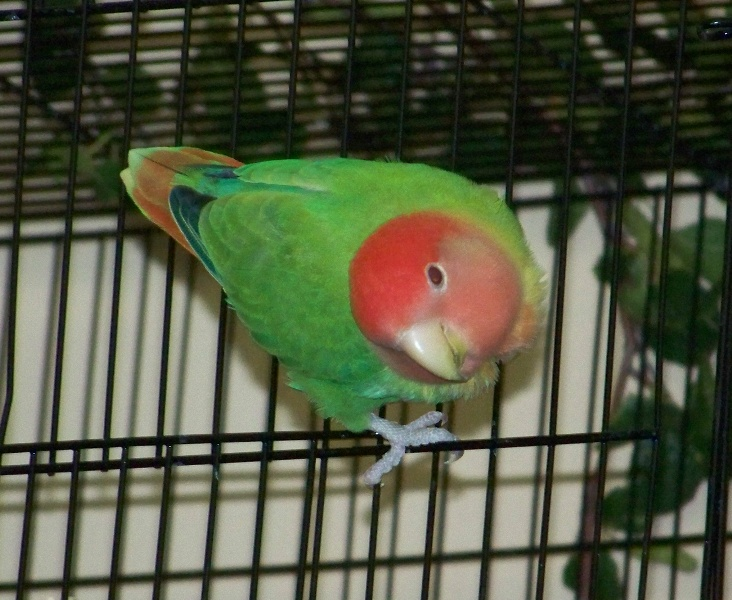
Wild Green Single Violet Opaline, an example of a sex-linked mutation. Notice the distinctive hood that extends over the back of the skull, rather than ending at the front of the skull like a normal rosy-faced headband.

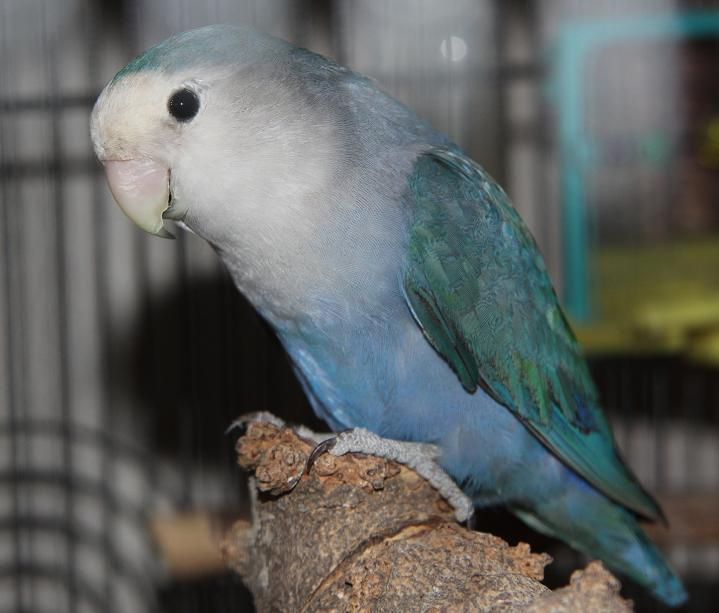
A Whitefaced Blue (Turquoise) female

The science of rosy-faced lovebird colour genetics deals with the heredity of colour variation in the feathers of the species known as Agapornis roseicollis, commonly known as the rosy-faced lovebird or peach-faced lovebird.

Rosy-faced lovebirds have the deepest range of mutations available of all the Agapornis species. Generally speaking, these mutations fall into the genetic categories of dominant, co-dominant, recessive, and X-linked recessive (also called "sex-linked recessive"). While this seems fairly straightforward, it can quickly become confusing when a single specimen has multiple examples of these mutational traits.

== Base color ==
All rosy-faced lovebirds, without exception, belong to one of two base colors: Green-series (also referred to as Wild Green), which is a dominant trait, and Blue-series, which is a recessive trait. Within the Blue-series base color, there are currently two recognized variants – Dutch Blue (also known as Aqua) and Whitefaced Blue (also known as Turquoise). These recessive Blue-series traits of Aqua and Turquoise are alleles, and when an Aqua allele and a Turquoise allele are matched in a rosy-faced lovebird, the resulting variant is referred to as a "Seagreen" (also known as "AquaTurquoise"). As the Blue-series alleles are recessive, a bird must receive one of the blue-series alleles from each parent in order for the blue-series trait to be seen visually. A bird that has only one recessive gene for a specific trait is said to be "split" for that trait. Thus, a bird who receives a green base-color gene from one parent and a blue-series gene from the other parent would be visually Wild Green, as Green is dominant, but "split" for the blue trait.

== Other mutations ==
Beyond the base coloring of a rosy-faced lovebird, there are mutations that exist independently of any other mutation. These mutations are of three distinct types: co-dominant (exemplified by the Orangefaced, Dark and Violet mutations), recessive (exemplified by the Edged Dilute mutation), and sex-linked (exemplified by Lutino, Pallid [also known as Australian Cinnamon], American Cinnamon, and Opaline mutations).

=== Co-dominant traits ===
With co-dominant traits, only one parent bird needs to provide the genetic information that makes up a chromosome pairing in order for the trait to be seen visually (referred to as a Single Factor for that trait) - although a passing of the genetic information from both parents will create a stronger and more easily seen example of the mutation, which is referred to as a "Double Factor" for Dark or Violet, and simply called "Orangefaced" for a double factor Orangefaced bird.

=== Recessive traits ===
With recessive traits, the particular mutation can be seen visually only if each parent passes a recessive gene for the particular trait. Thus, while one can visually distinguish a bird with only one co-dominant gene, such as a single factor Orange faced rosy-faced, a bird with only a single recessive gene, as in the Edged Dilute, will not be seen visually. As with the base-color recessive traits, a bird that has only one recessive gene from one parent's contributed genetic code is said to be "split" for that trait.

=== Sex-linked traits ===
Sex-linked traits are a little bit more complex because these recessive traits are carried on the genetic information which determines the gender of a bird. These genes are usually referred to in simplified terms as X and Y genes. In mammals, it is the male that determines the sex of their offspring, in that mammal males have one X gene and one Y gene on a chromosome pairing (XY) and can pass either to an offspring - while a mammal female can only pass an X, due to their chromosomal pairing of XX. However, in birds and reptiles, this pairing is just the opposite: thus, in Lovebirds, it is the female which has an XY pairing and thus determines the sex of an offspring, depending on whether the mother passes an X gene or a Y gene.

It is on the X gene that the genetic information for sex-linked recessive traits is passed. As a sex-linked trait is a recessive trait, each X in a chromosomal pairing must have the recessive trait encoded within it, or the trait will not show visually. However, a female bird only has one X gene, and that gene is paired not with another X, but rather with a Y. Because of this, if a female bird inherits an X from her father that has the sex-linked information attached to it, the female will be visual for the sex-linked recessive trait, because there is no second X to match up with the X passed from the father. This is only true of female birds; since male birds, by genetic definition, must have two X genes (XX), both X genes must have the same sex-linked recessive information in order to show that sex-linked recessive trait visually.
