= Lutino rosy-faced lovebird mutation =

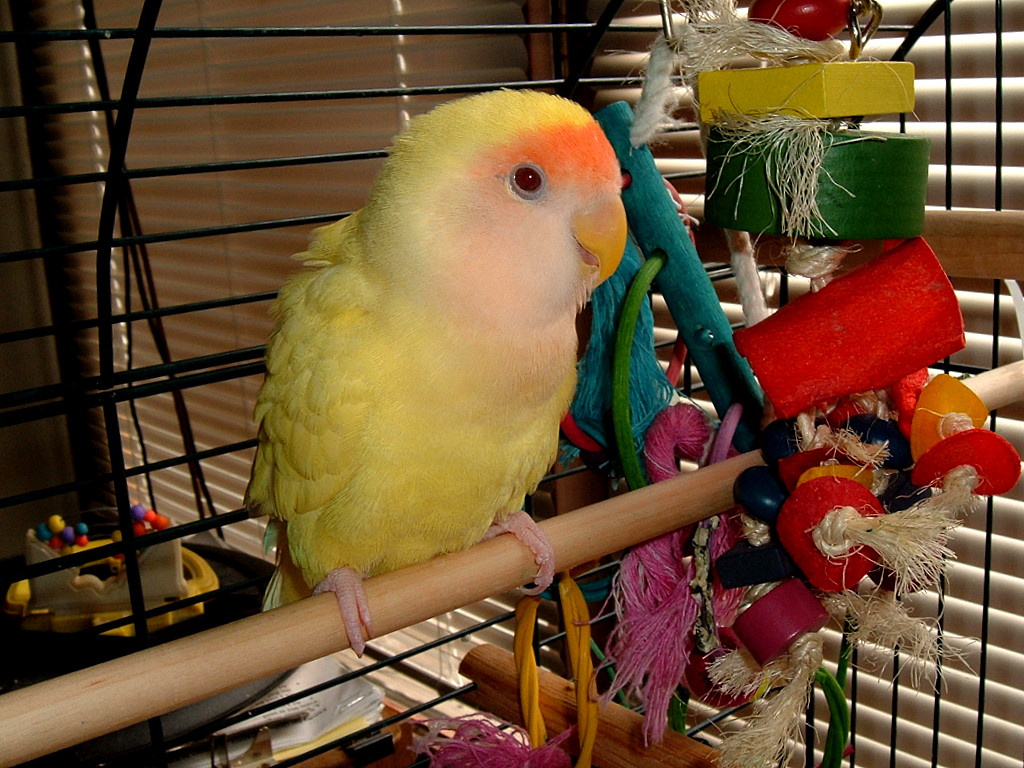
Lutino lovebird in cage

The lutino peach-faced love bird (Agapornis roseicollis) is one of the most popular mutations of rosy-faced lovebird. It is closely followed by the Dutch blue lovebird in popularity.

== See also ==
- Rosy-faced lovebird
- Rosy-faced lovebird colour genetics
- Lutino cockatiel mutation
