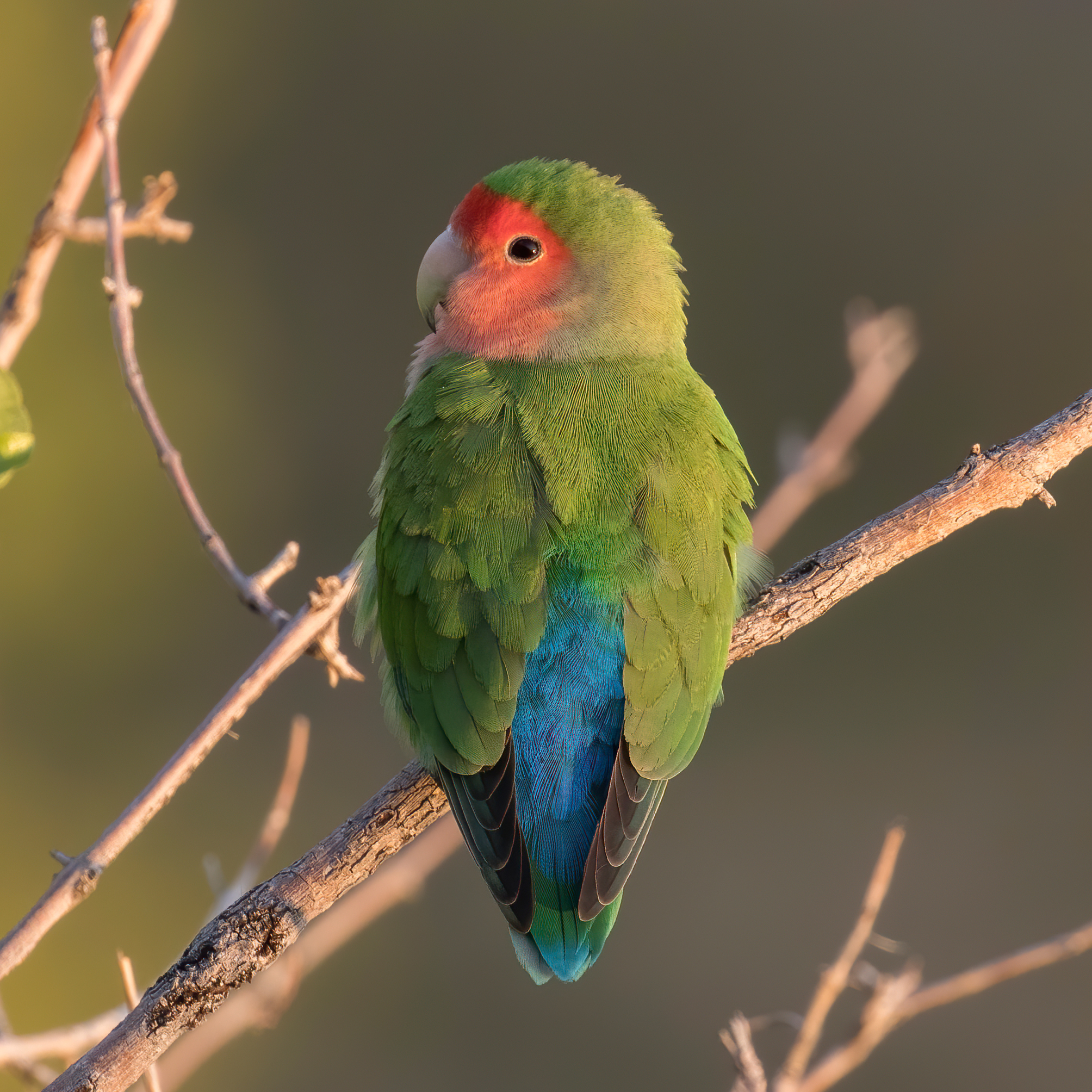
- in Erongo, Namibia

Conservation status
- Least Concern (IUCN 3.1)

Scientific classification
- Kingdom: Animalia
- Phylum: Chordata
- Class: Aves
- Order: Psittaciformes
- Family: Psittaculidae
- Genus: Agapornis
- Species: A. roseicollis

Binomial name
- Agapornis roseicollis (Vieillot, 1818)
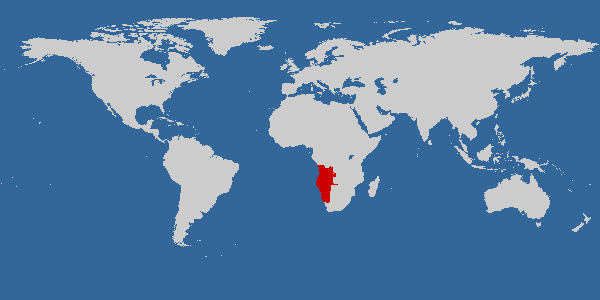
- Native ranges in the Namib Desert and arid areas of Namibia and Angola

= Rosy-faced lovebird =

Species of bird

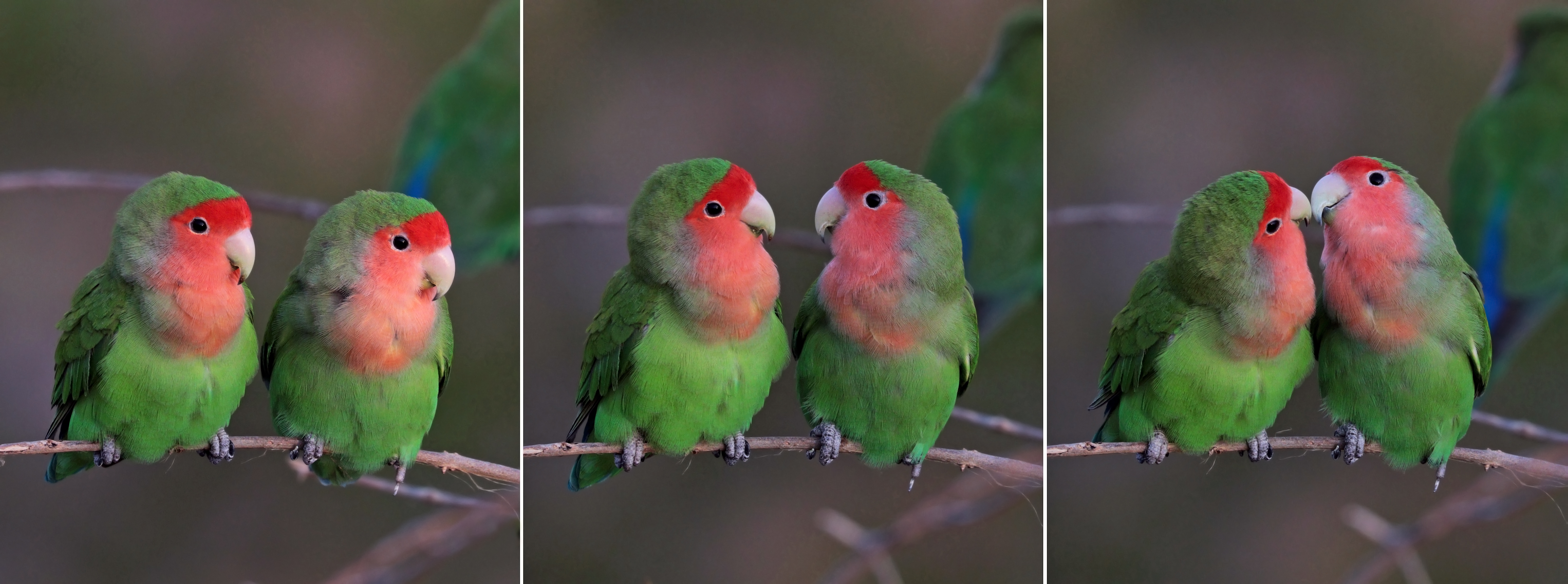
Courting pair, Namibia

The rosy-faced lovebird (Agapornis roseicollis), also known as the rosy-collared or peach-faced lovebird, is a species of lovebird native to the Namibian savanna woodlands. Loud and constant chirpers, these birds are very social animals and often congregate in small groups in the wild. They eat throughout the day and take frequent baths. Coloration can vary widely among populations. Plumage is identical in males and females. Lovebirds are renowned for their sleep position in which they sit side-by-side and turn their faces in towards each other. Also, females are well noted to tear raw materials into long strips, "twisty-tie" them onto their backs, and fly substantial distances back to make a nest. These birds are common in the pet industry.

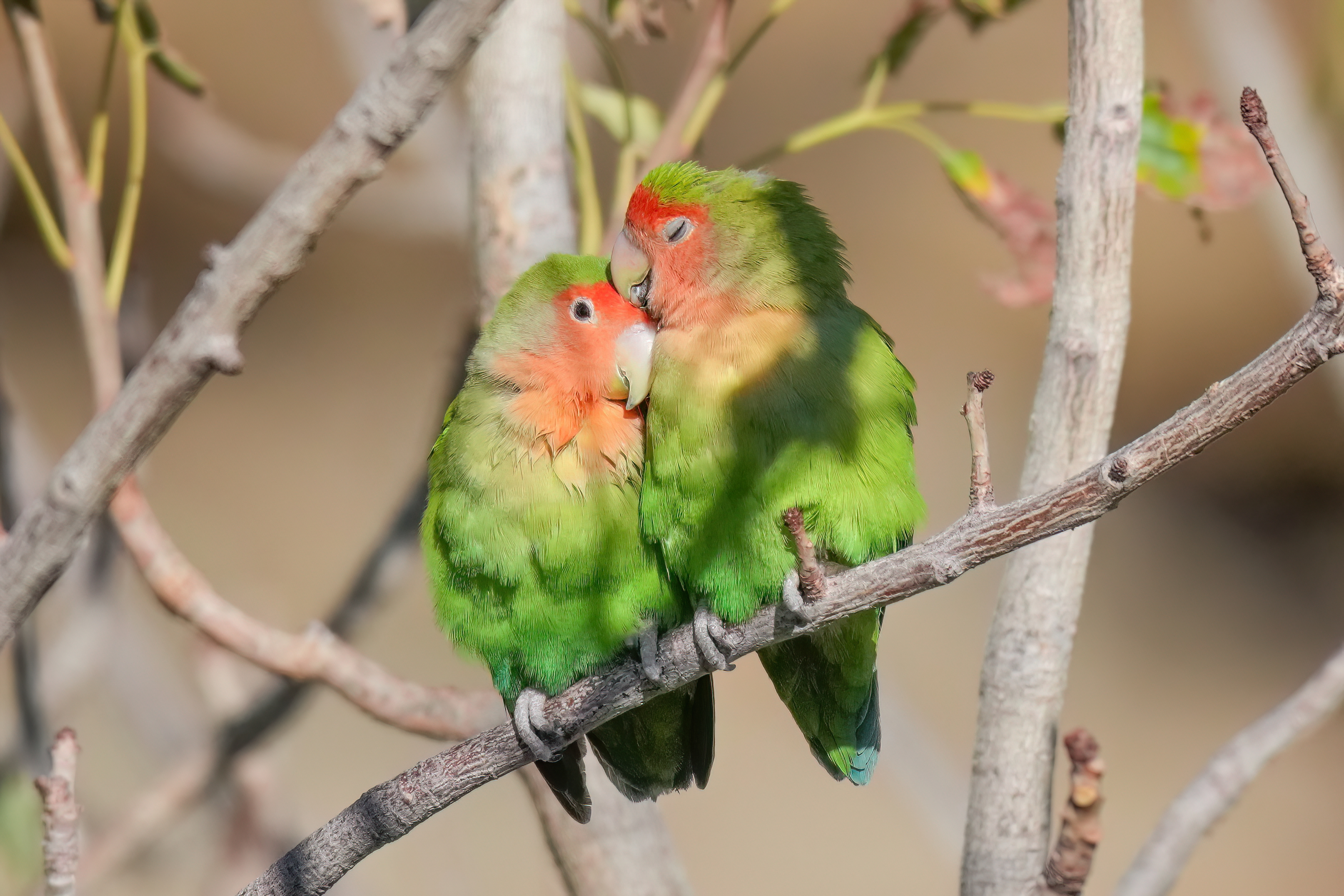
Rosy-faced lovebird couple cuddling

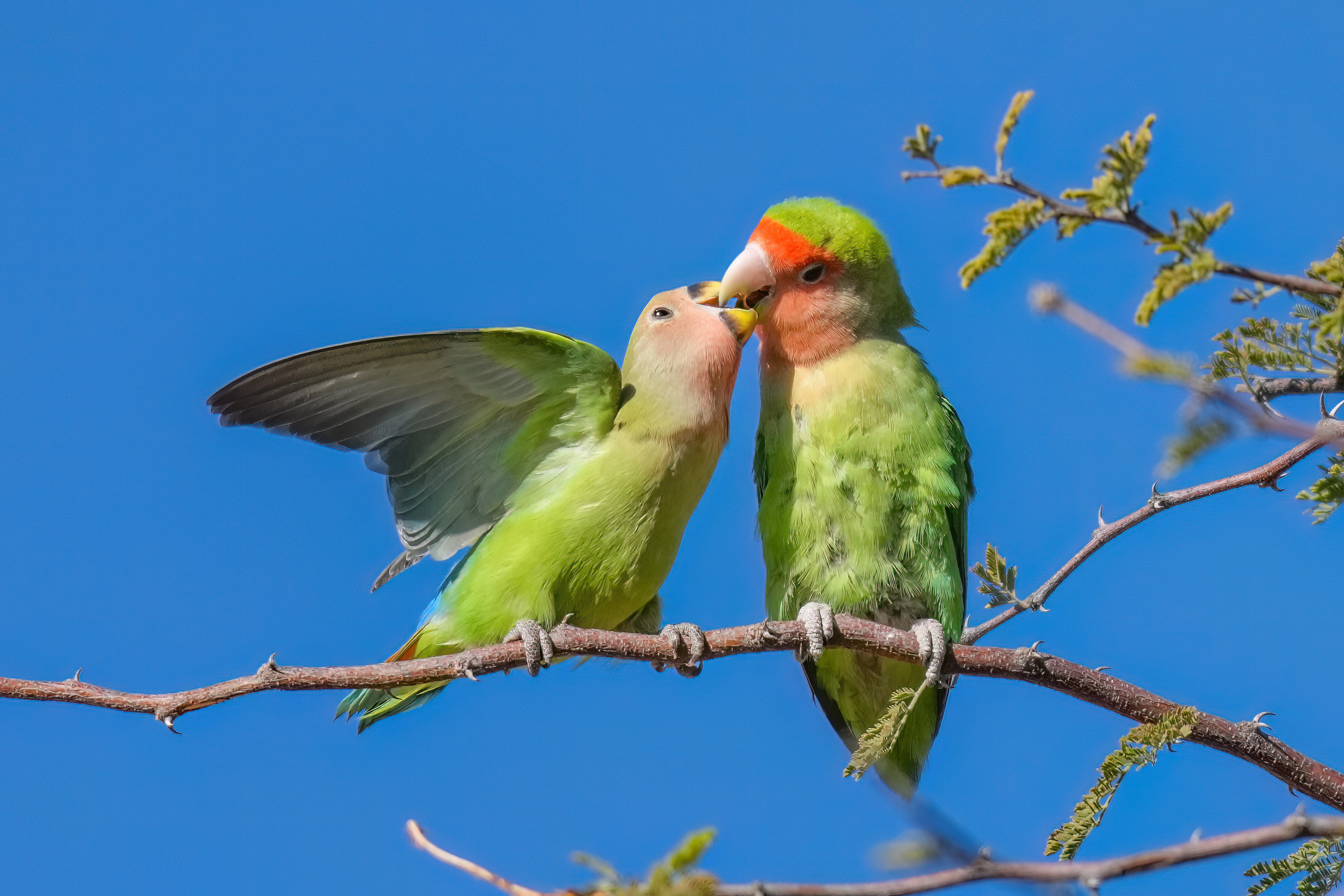
Rosy-faced lovebird feeding a juvenile

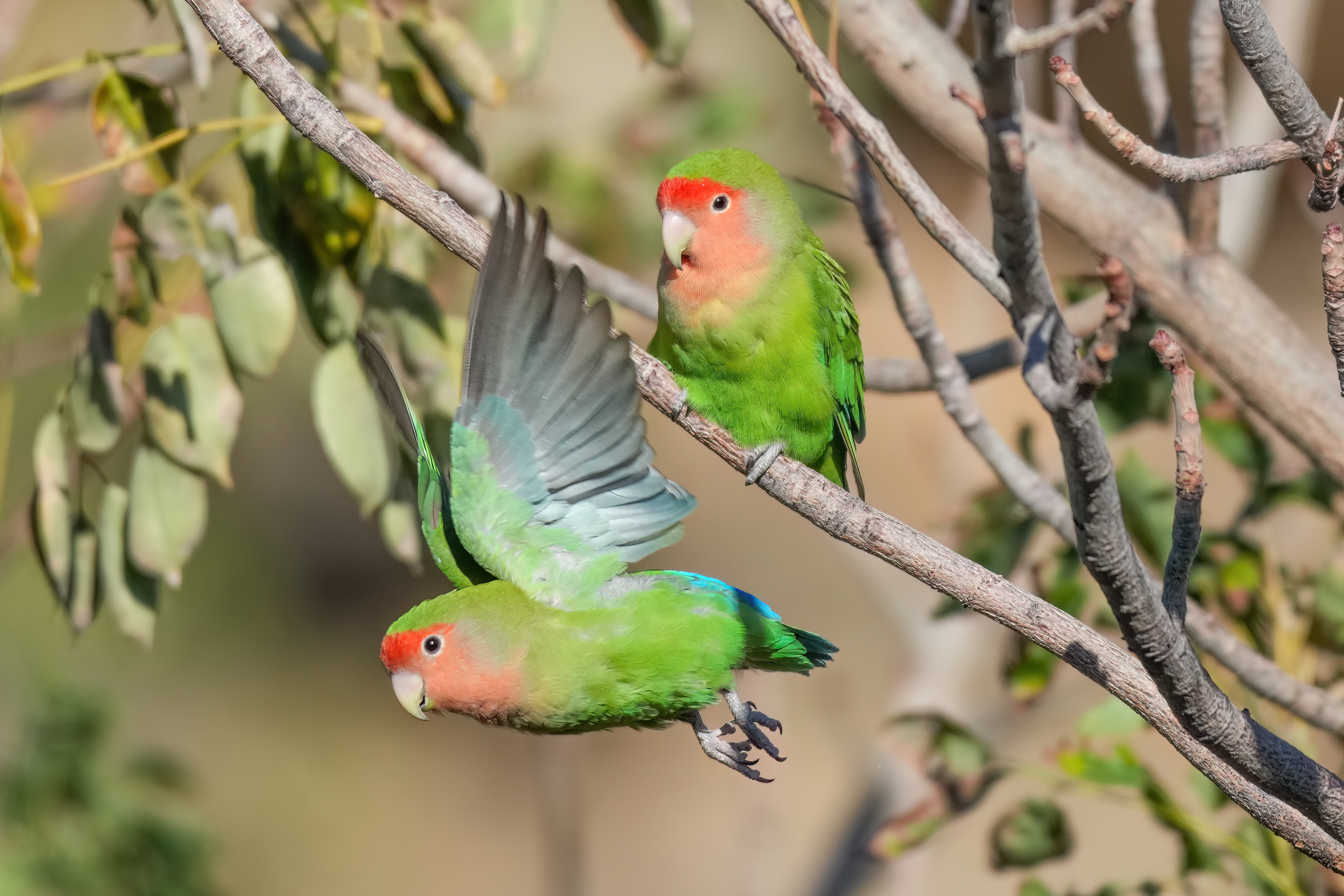
Rosy-faced lovebird couple taking off

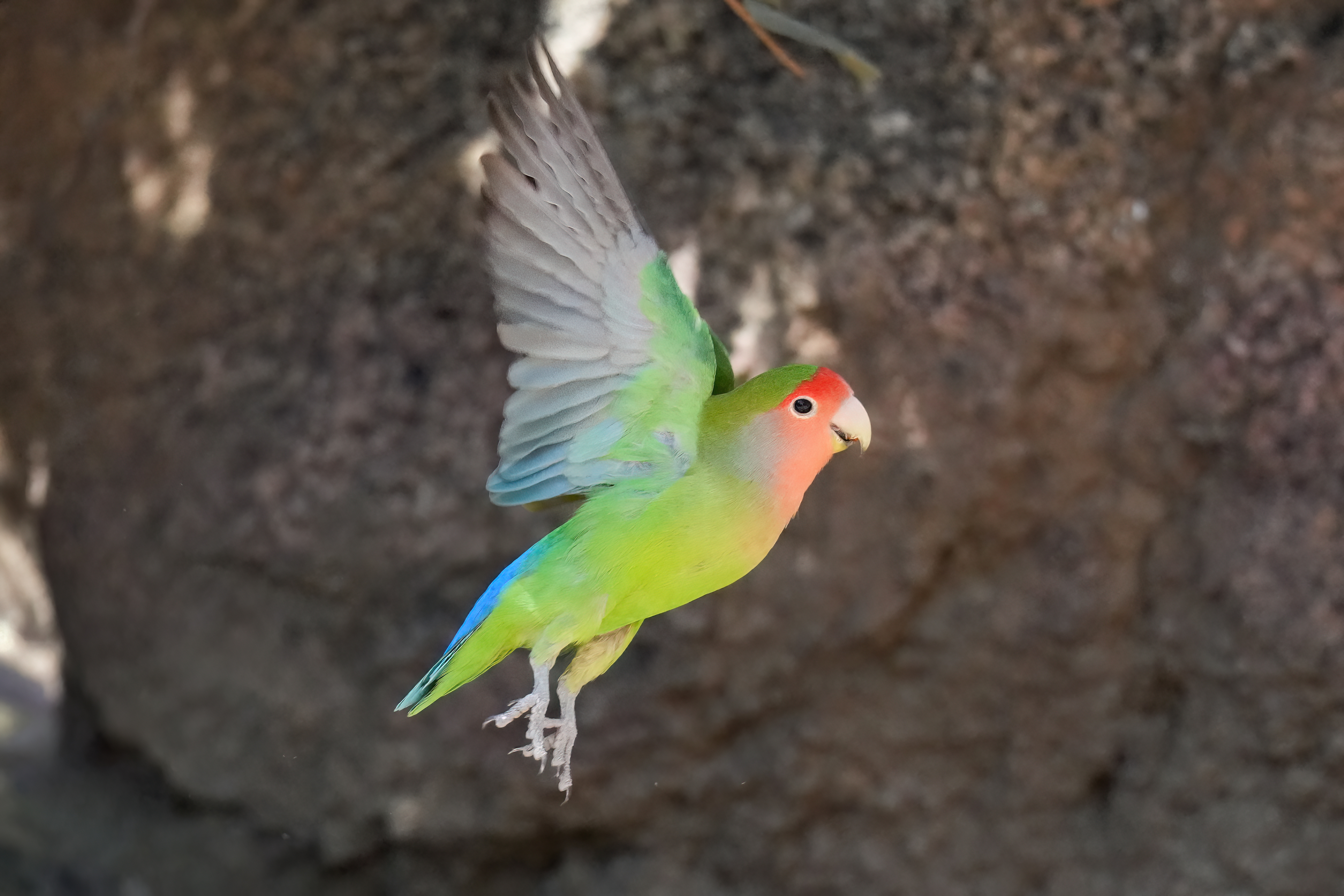
Rosy-faced lovebird in flight

== Taxonomy ==
It was described by the French ornithologist Louis Pierre Vieillot in 1818. It was originally named Psittacus roseicollis but later moved to the genus Agapornis with the other lovebirds.

Two subspecies are recognised:

- Agapornis roseicollis, (Vieillot, 1818)

- Agapornis roseicollis catumbella, B.P. Hall, 1952 - Angola
- Agapornis roseicollis roseicollis, (Vieillot 1818) - Namibia, Botswana, and South Africa

== Description ==
The rosy-faced lovebird is a fairly small bird, 17–18 cm (6.7–7.1 in) long, with an average wing length of 106 mm (4.2 in) and tail length of 44–52 mm (1.7–2.0 in). Wild birds are mostly green with a blue rump. The face and throat are pink, darkest on the forehead and above the eye. The bill is horn-coloured, the iris is brown, and the legs and feet are grey. The pink of the A. r. roseicollis is lighter than that of the A. r. catumbella. Juvenile birds have a pale pink face and throat, a greenish fore crown and crown, and the beak has a brownish base.

== Distribution and habitat ==
The rosy-faced lovebird inhabits dry, open country in southwest Africa. Its range extends from southwest Angola across most of Namibia to the lower Orange River valley in northwest South Africa. It lives up to 1,600 metres (5,200 ft) above sea level in broad-leaved woodland, semi-desert, and mountainous areas. It is dependent on the presence of water sources and gathers around pools to drink.

Escapes from captivity are frequent in many parts of the world and feral birds dwell in metropolitan Phoenix, Arizona, where they live in a variety of habitats, both urban and rural. Some dwell in cacti and others have been known to frequent feeders in decent-sized flocks. Temperatures in Arizona regularly exceed 40 °C (104 °F) and feral lovebirds have been observed perching in large numbers on air-conditioner vents in order to remain cool. Feral rosy-faced lovebird colonies can also be found on Maui and the Big Island in Hawaii. Although they have been observed in the wild in Puerto Rico, they are probably the result of escaped pets, and no reproduction has been recorded.

=== Status and conservation ===
Populations have been reduced in some areas by trapping for the pet trade. However, numbers may have increased in other areas due to human creation of new water sources and the building of artificial structures which provide new nesting sites. Because of this, the species is classed as Least Concern by the International Union for Conservation of Nature (IUCN).

== Behaviour in the wild ==
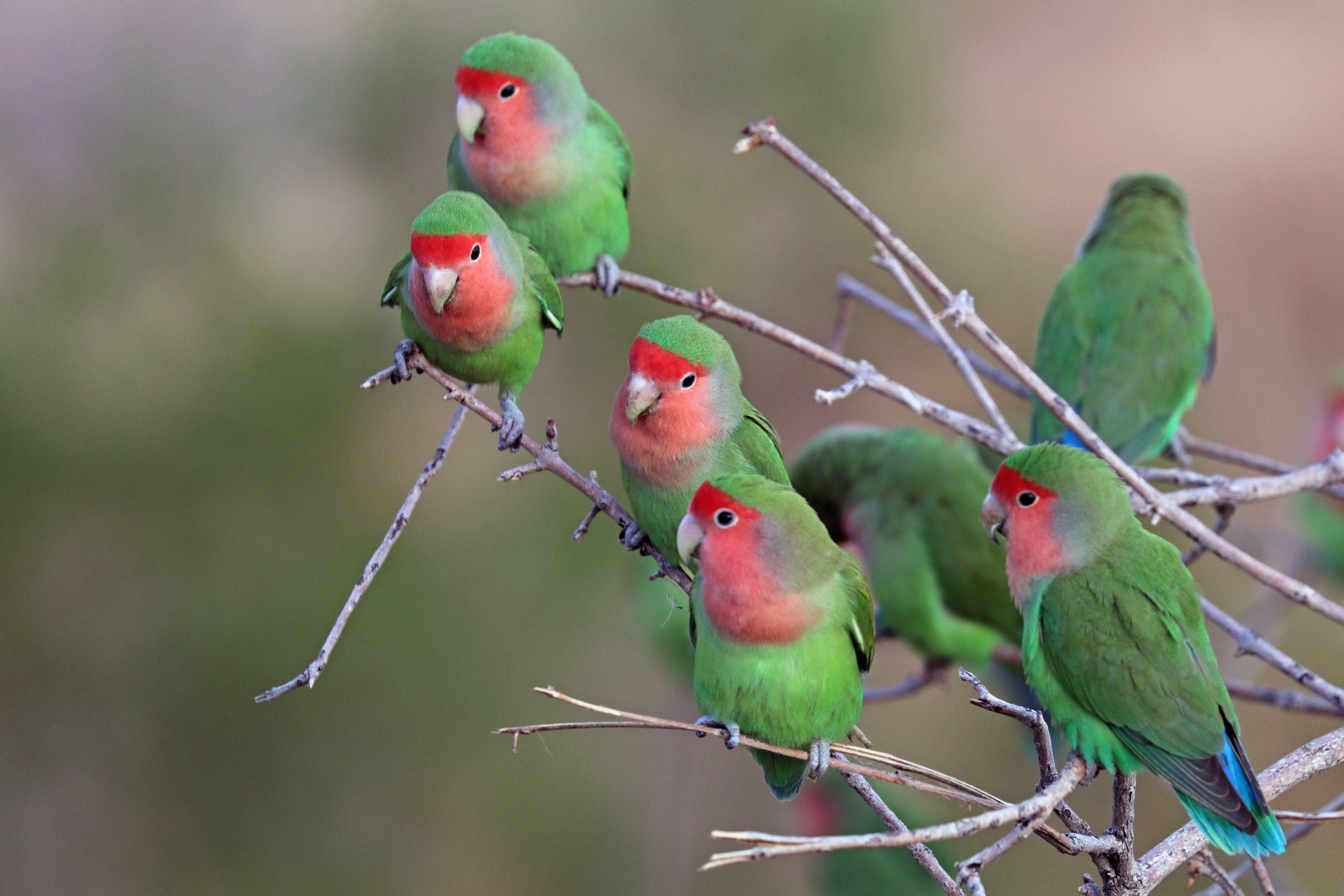
Flock in Namibia

=== Feeding ===
The diet consists mainly of seeds and berries. When food is plentiful, the birds may gather in flocks containing hundreds of individuals. They can sometimes be pests in agricultural areas, feeding on crops such as millet.

=== Breeding ===
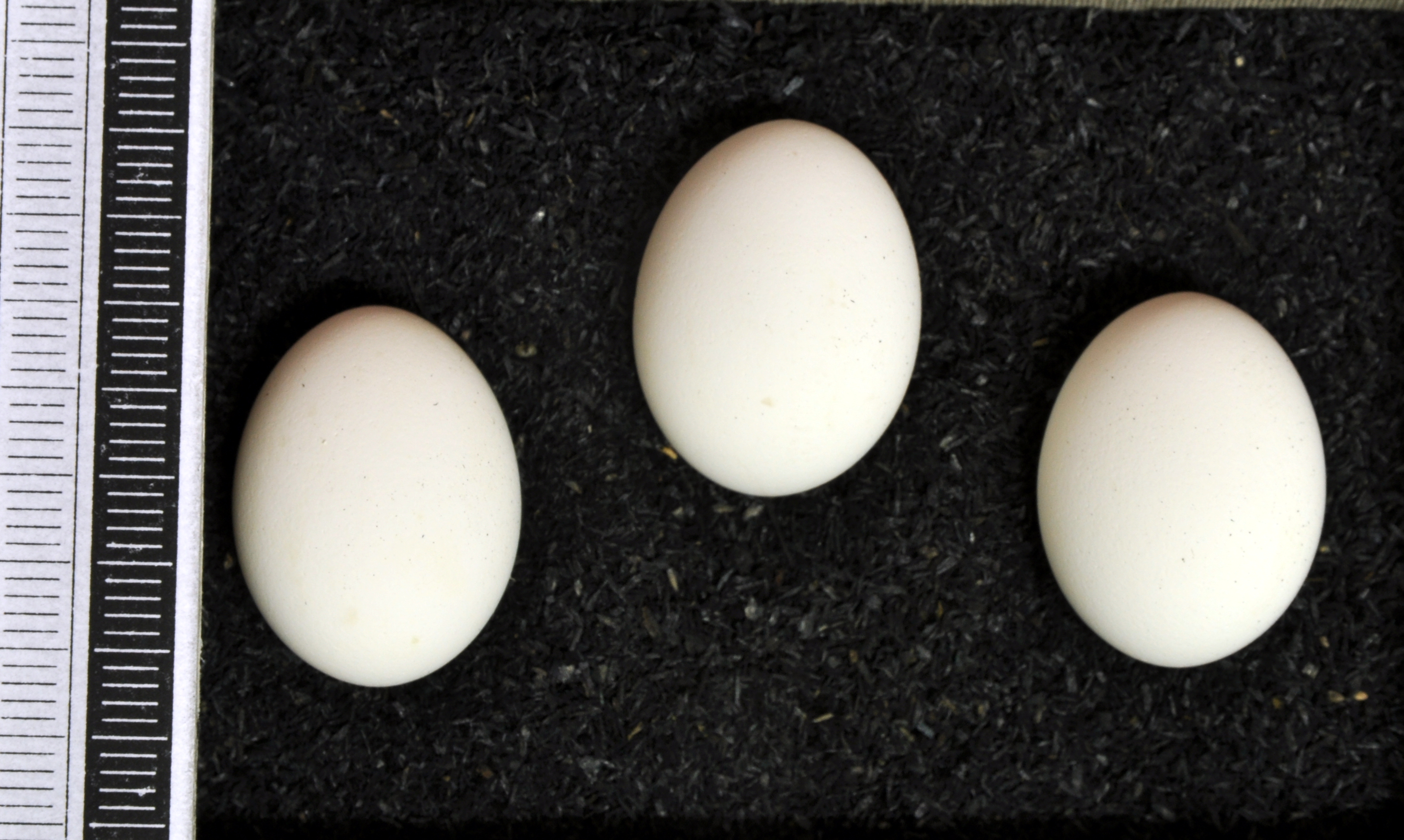
Eggs, Collection Museum Wiesbaden

Lovebirds are monomorphic, meaning the male and female of the species look alike. The nest is built in a rock crevice or within a compartment of the large communal nests built by sociable weavers. Man-made structures such as the roofs of houses may also be used. A total of 4-6 eggs are laid between February and April. They are dull white and measure 23.5 by 17.3 mm (0.93 by 0.68 in). They are incubated for about 23 days. The young birds fledge after 43 days.

=== Self-recognition ===
Rosy-faced lovebirds are the first Psittacidae species to pass the mark test, which means they are able to self-recognize their image reflected in a mirror.^{[9]}

== Aviculture ==
Rosy-faced lovebirds are one of the more common parrots kept in captivity, because of their small size and ease of care and breeding. The birds are kept alone or in pairs, although due to their social requirements, they are best kept in pairs. They can be aggressive, and tend to bond towards an individual, either human or avian, and may not get on well with other people or pets. Two lovebirds may not always get along, and may have to be separated, and lovebirds should not be kept with smaller species of birds. Lovebirds require daily exercise.

Captive bred birds

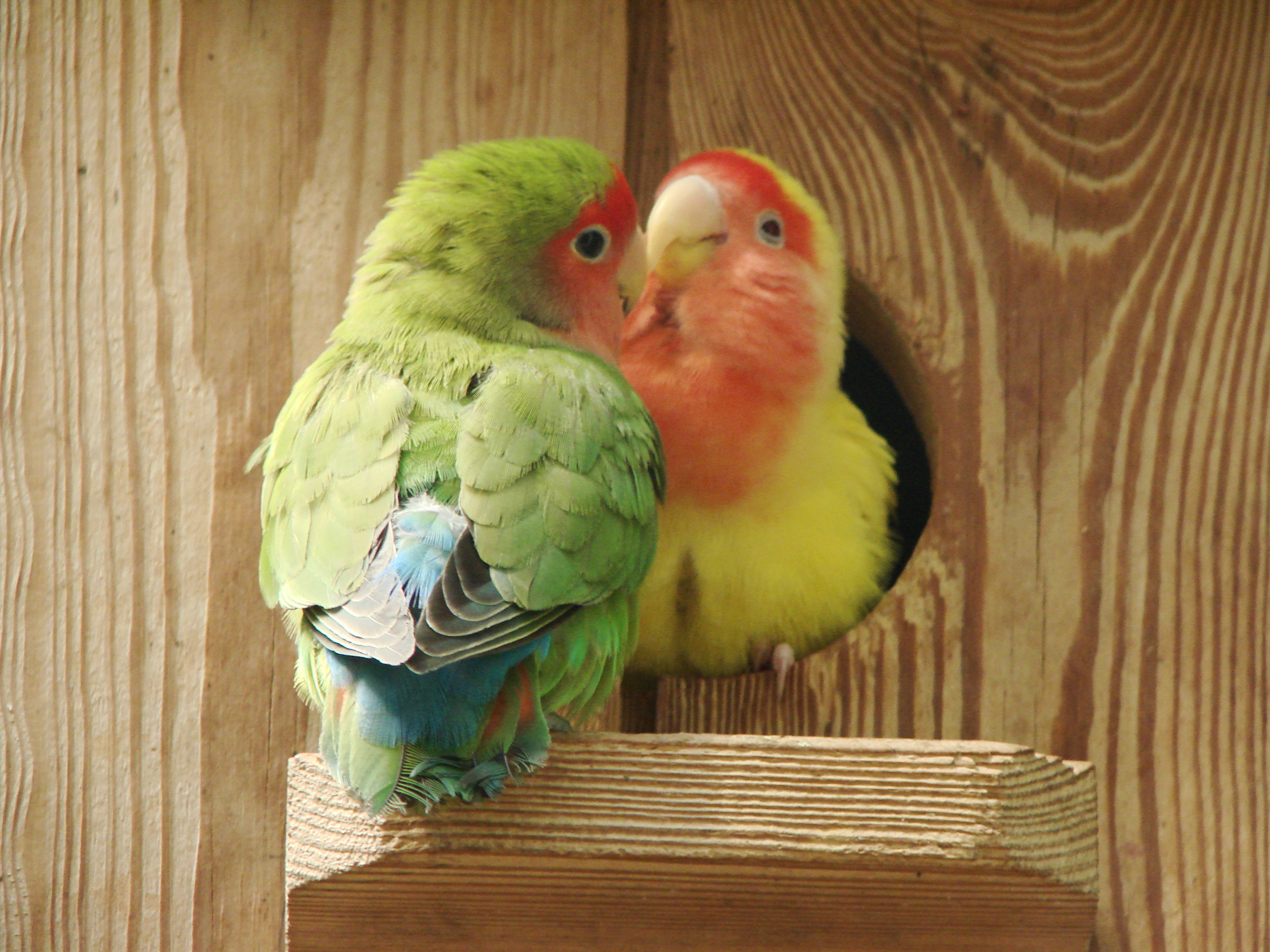
Pair at nestbox

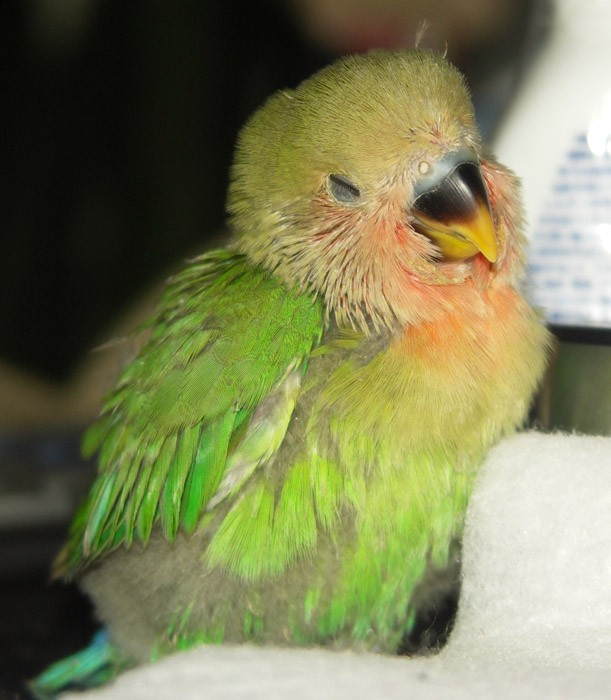
A pet chick

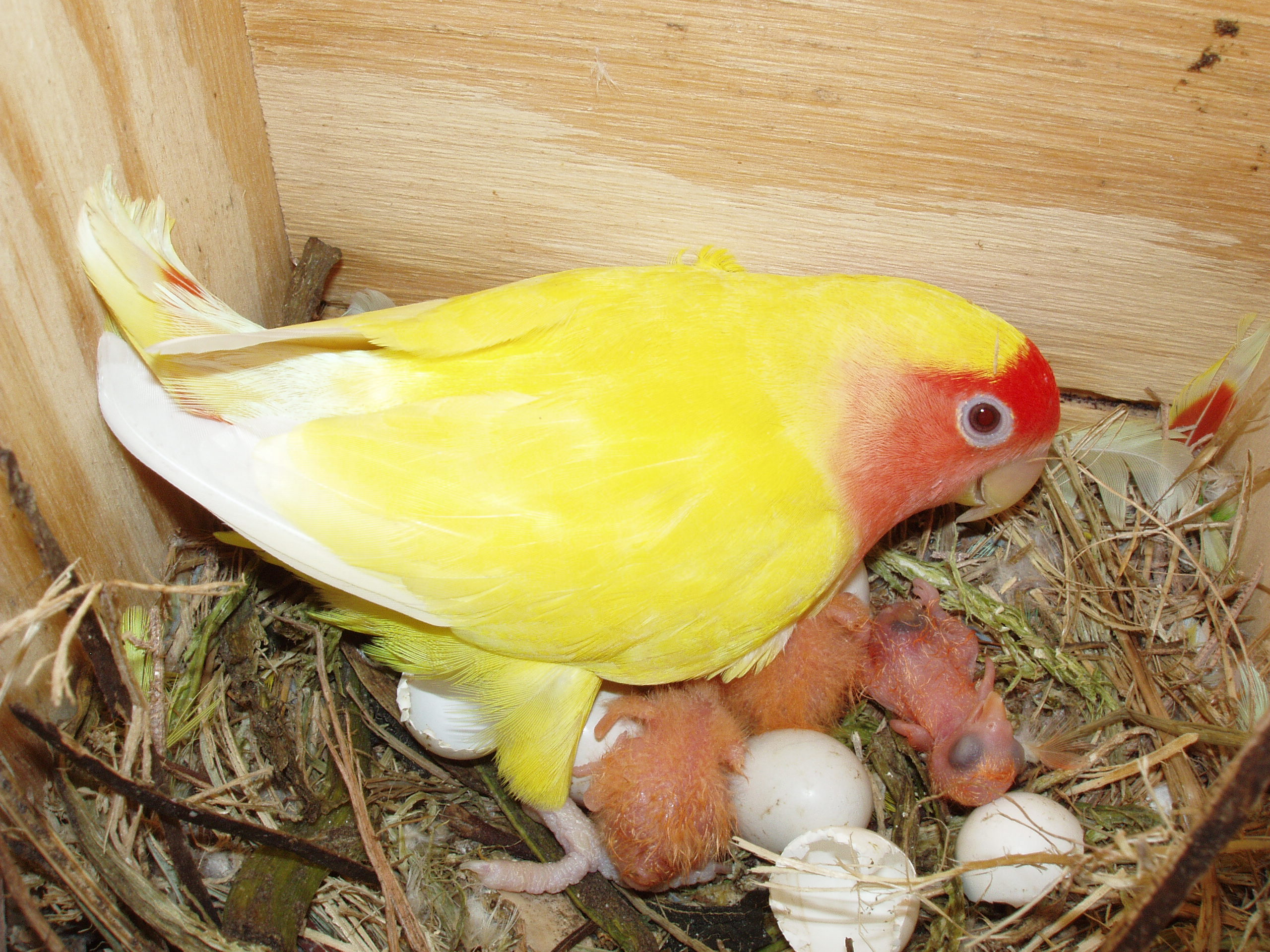
An adult lutino in nestbox with eggs and chicks

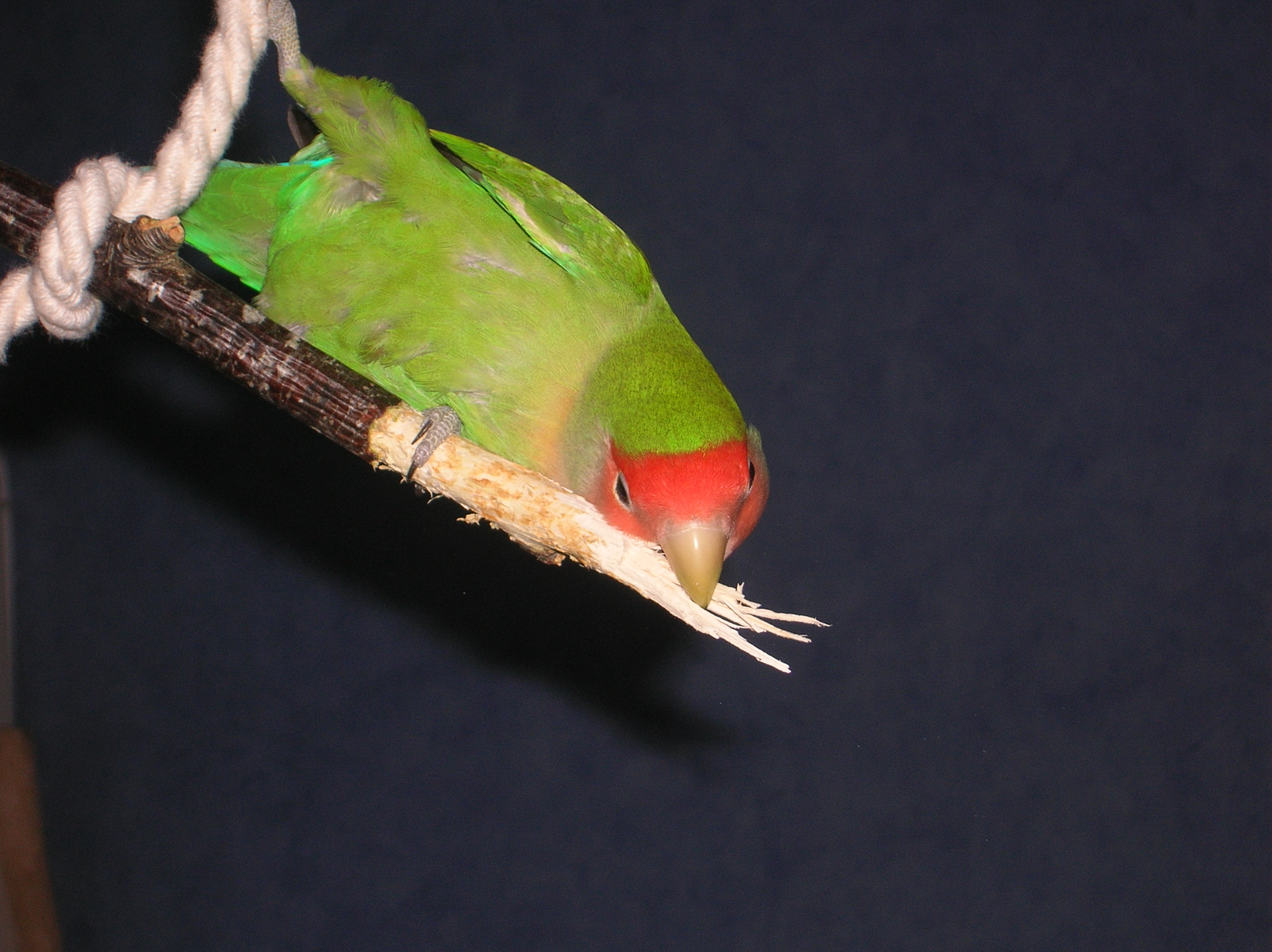
Pet playing

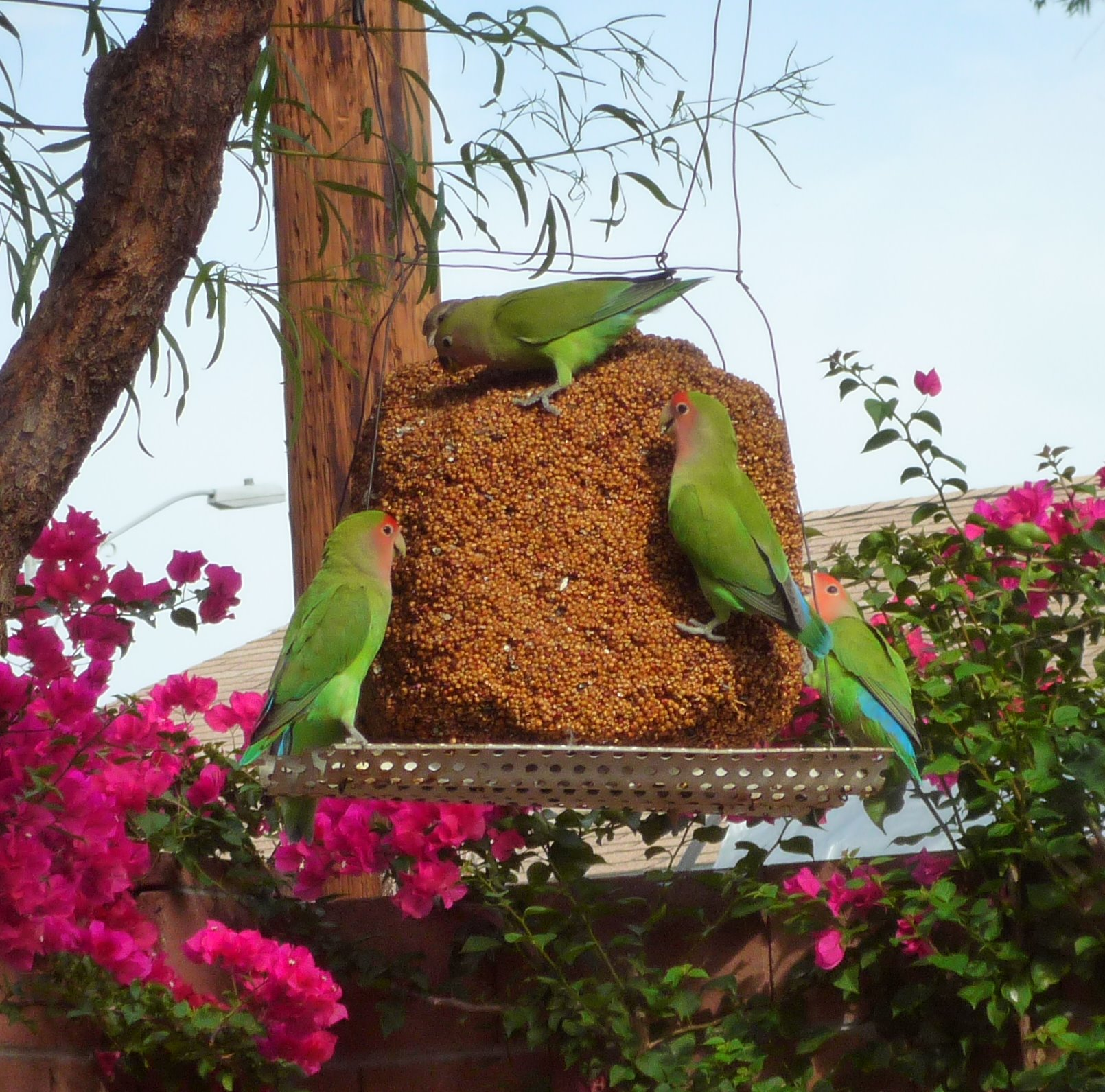
Feral lovebirds eating seeds from a garden feeder in Arizona, USA

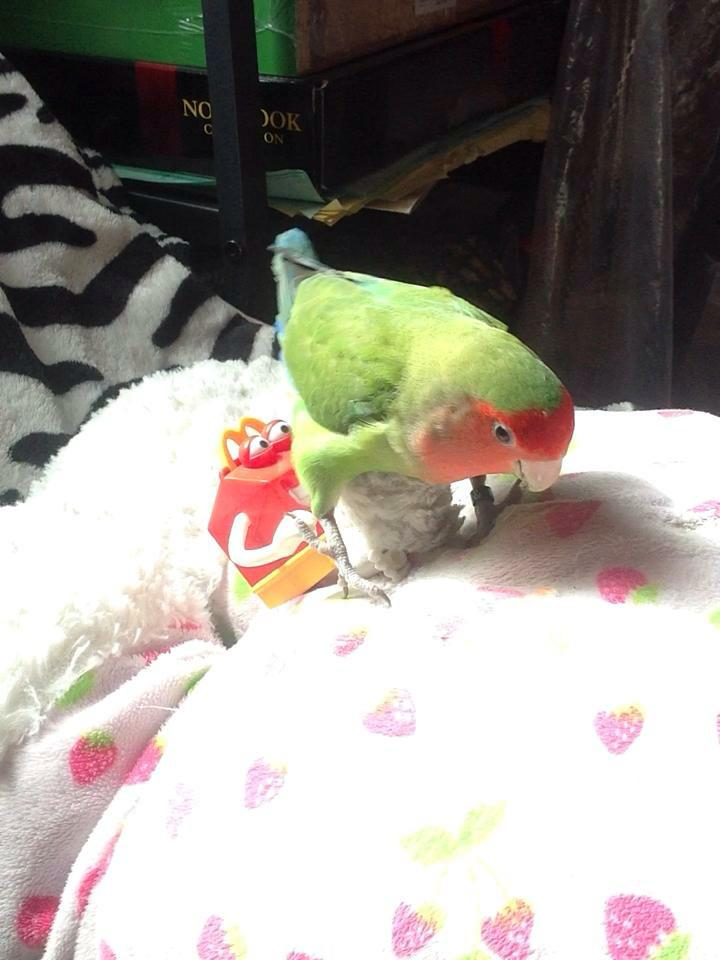
Lovebird playing with toy

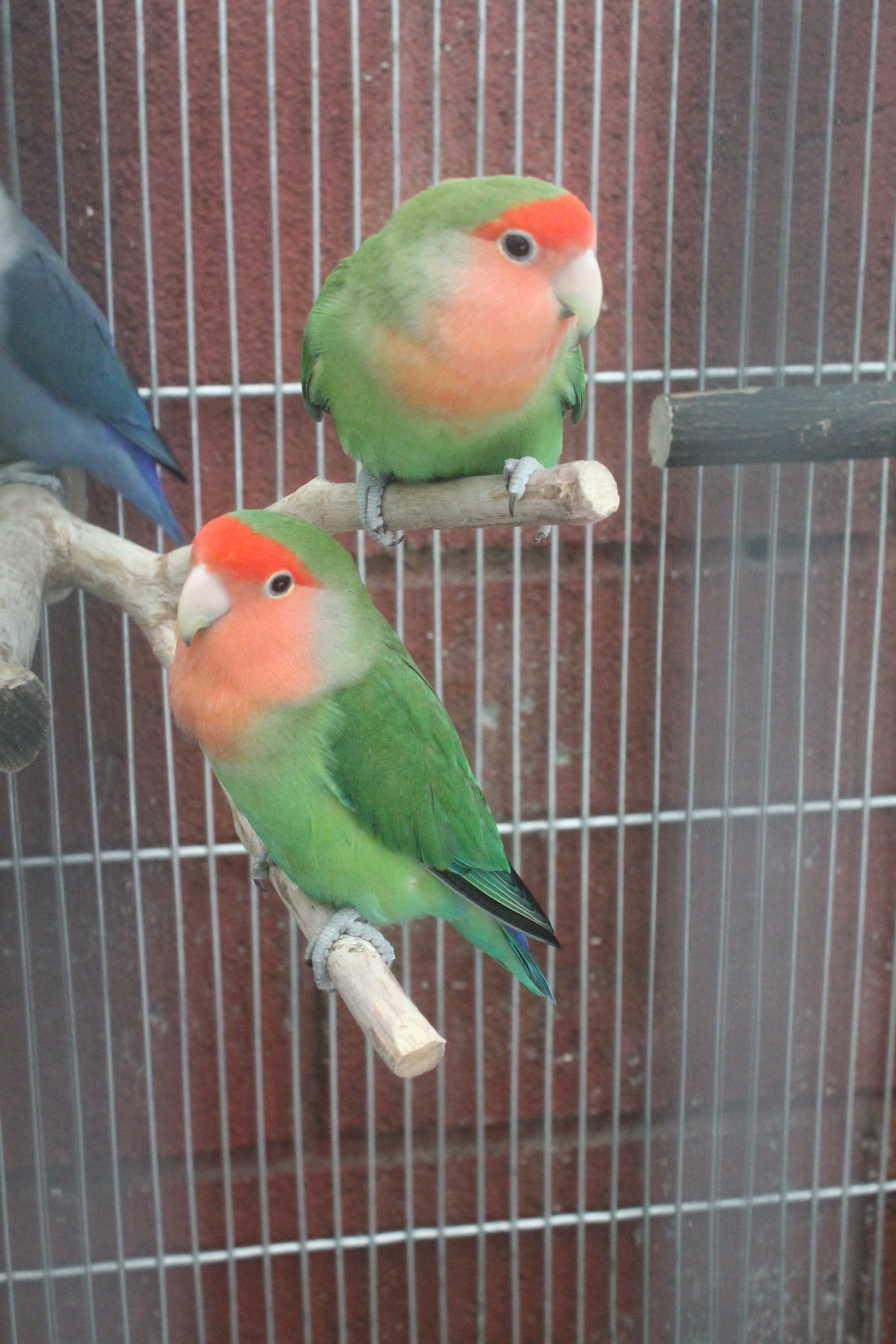
Pair in captivity

=== Mutations ===
Rosy-faced lovebirds have the widest range of colour mutations of all the Agapornis genus. Generally speaking, these mutations fall into the genetic categories of dominant, codominant, recessive, and sex-linked recessive. While this seems fairly straightforward, it can quickly become confusing when a single specimen has multiple examples of these mutational traits.

Colour varieties in aviculture

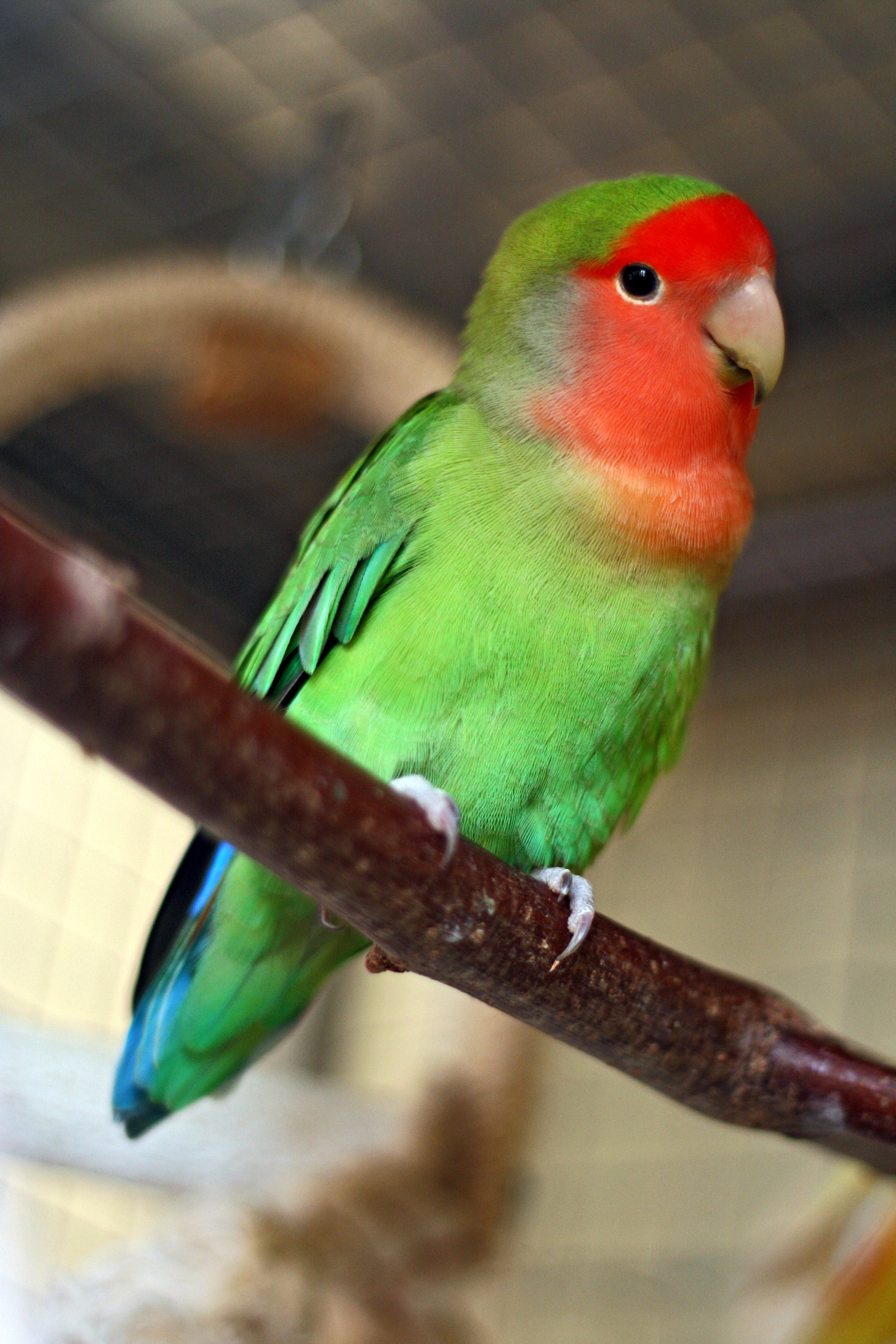
Wild type

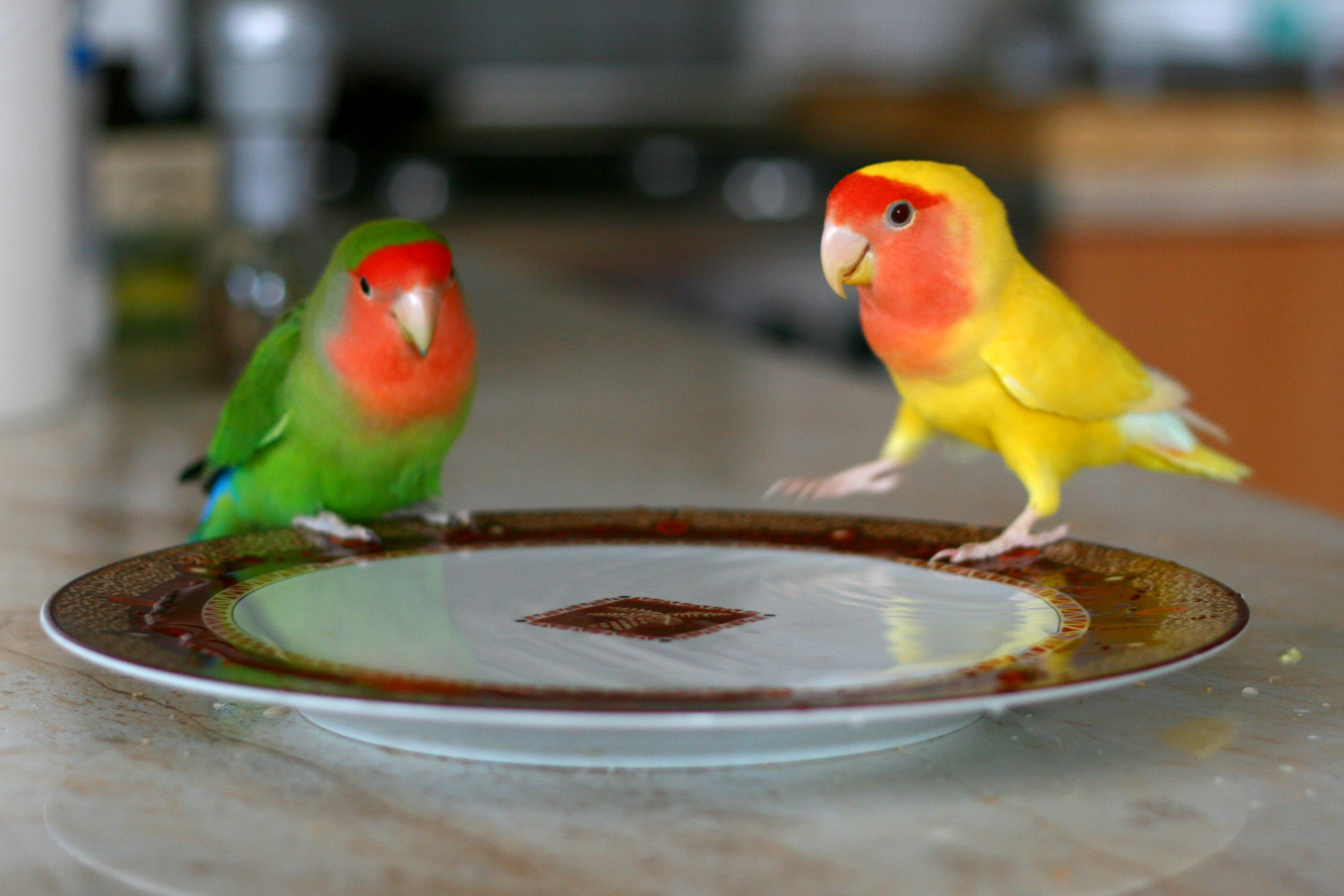
Left: Wild type
Right: Lutino mutation

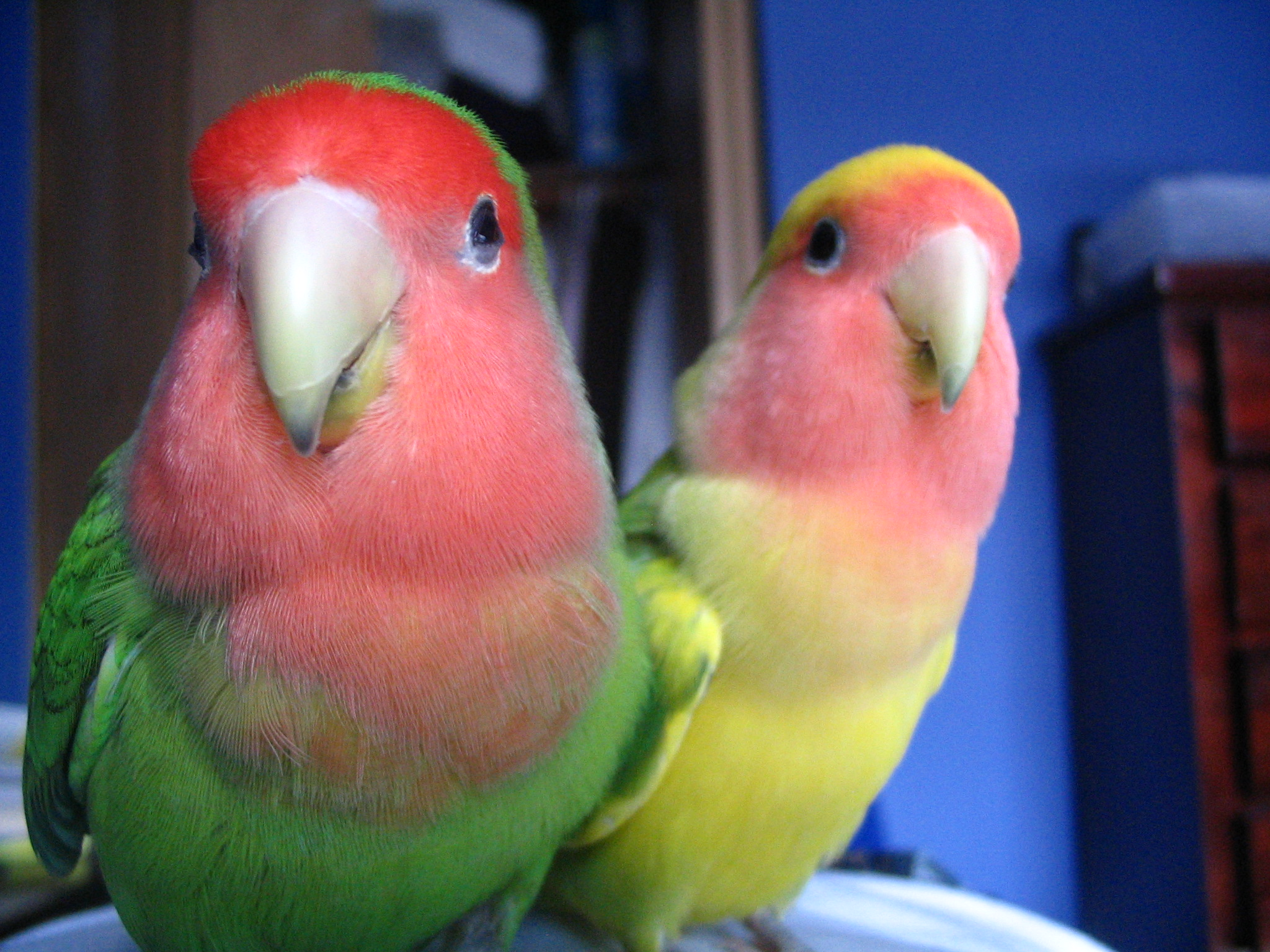
Left: Wild type
Right: Pied Green mutation

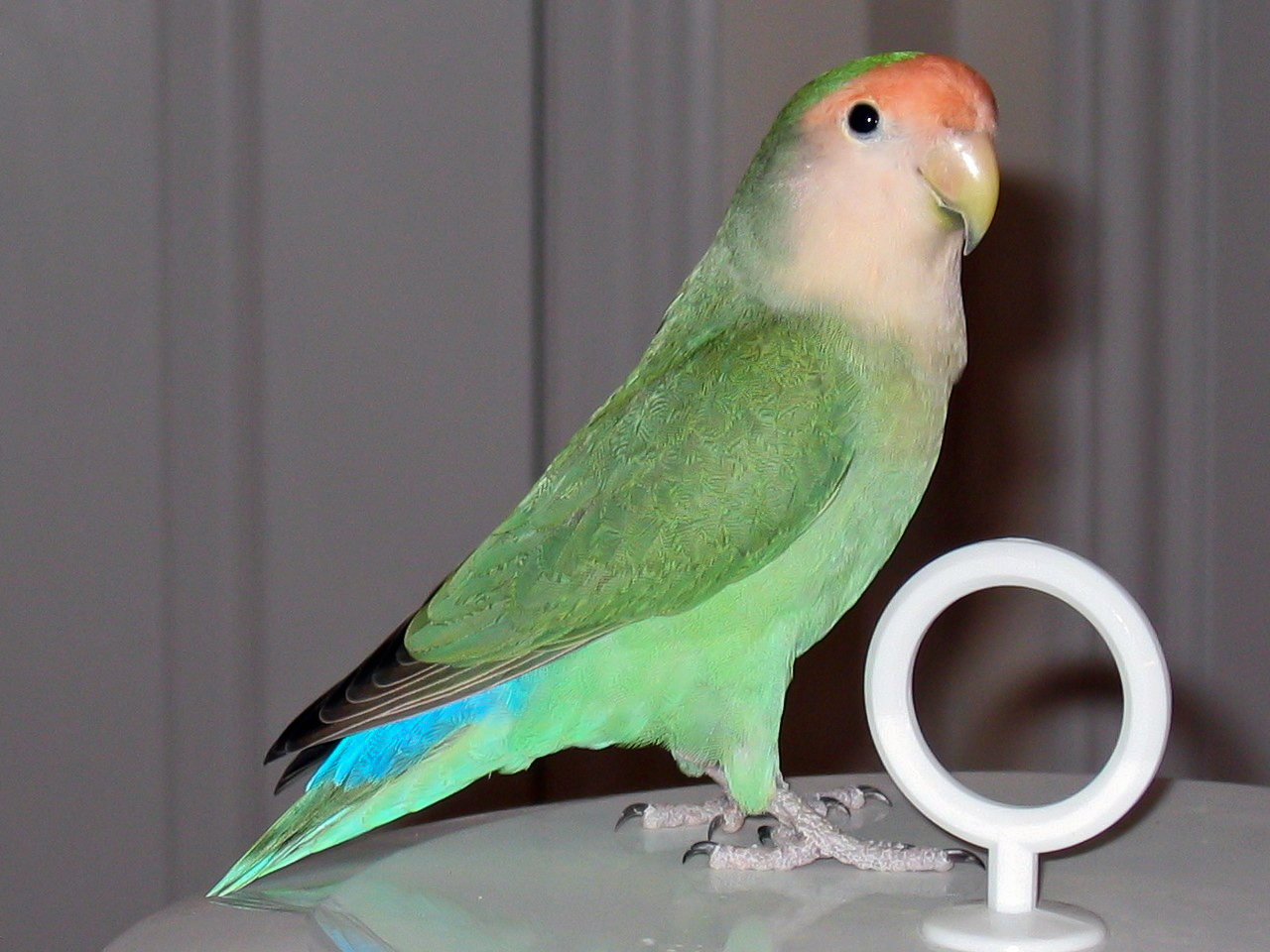
Aqua Turquoise mutation

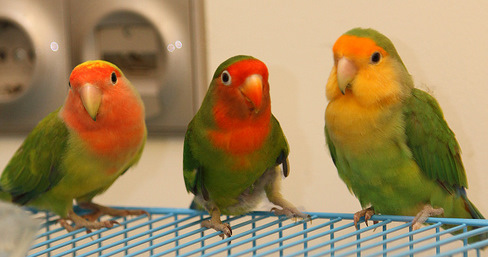
Left: Pied mutation
Center: Hybrid of peach-face and a fischeri
Right: Orange-face mutation

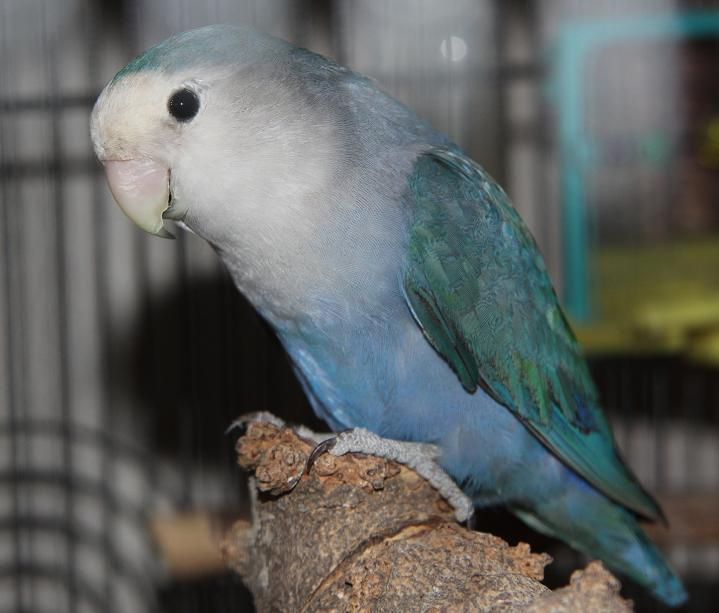
Turquoise mutation

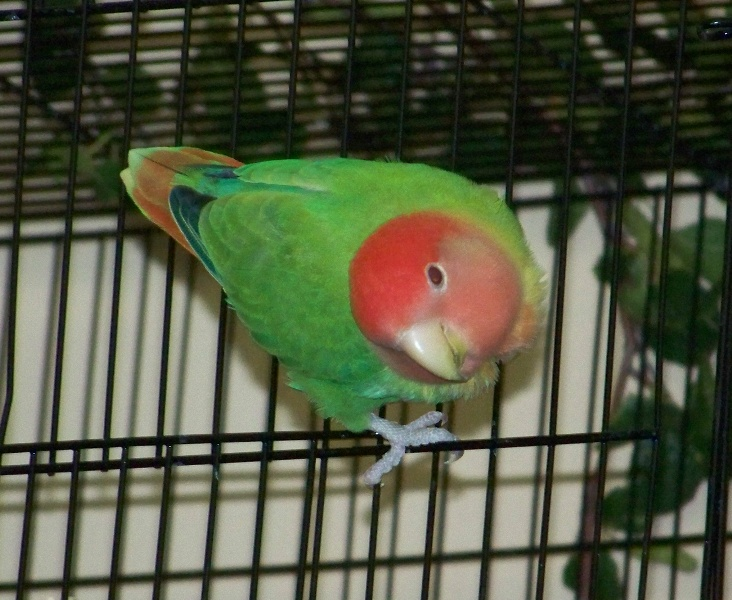
Green Single Violet factor Opaline mutation

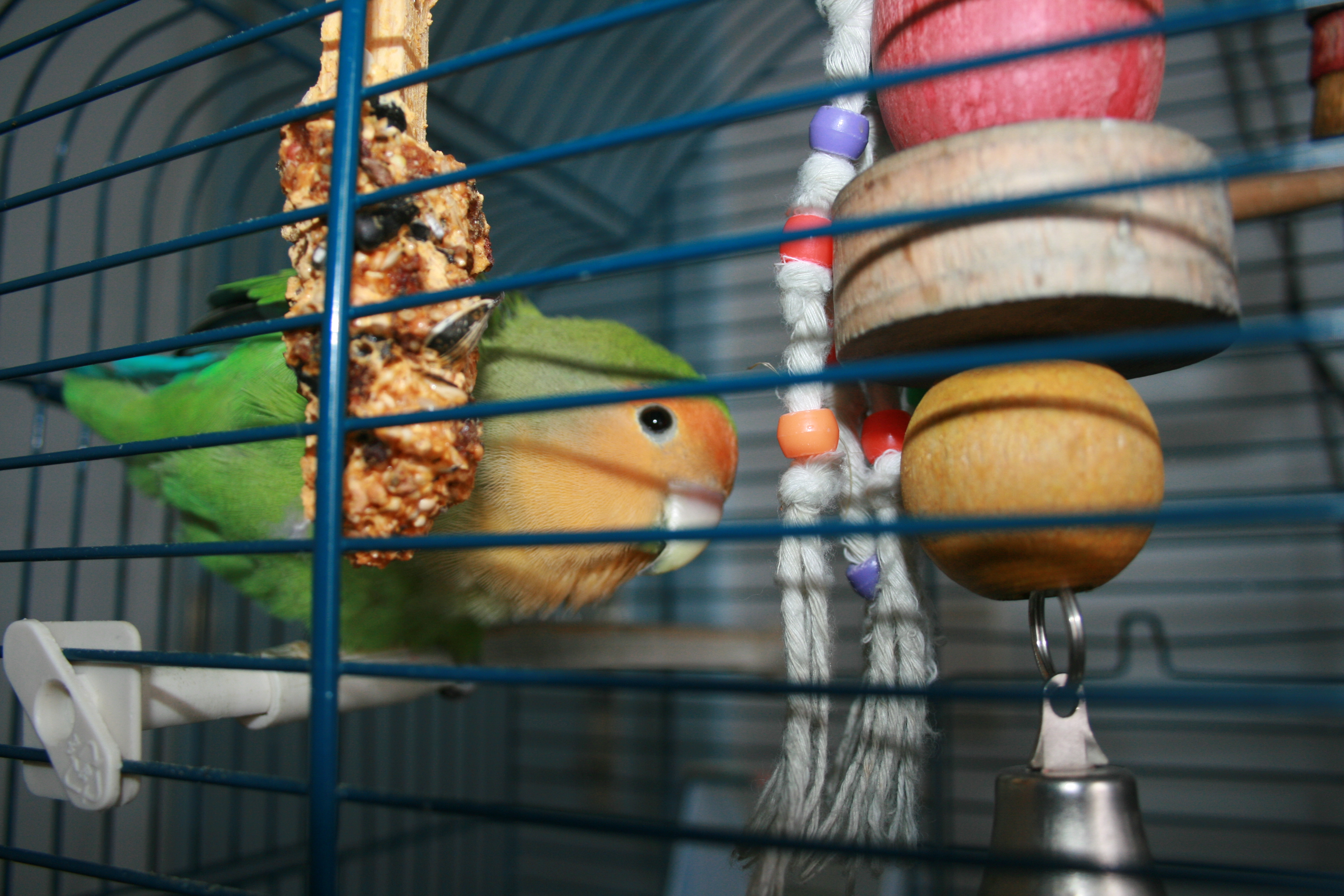
They can be tamed

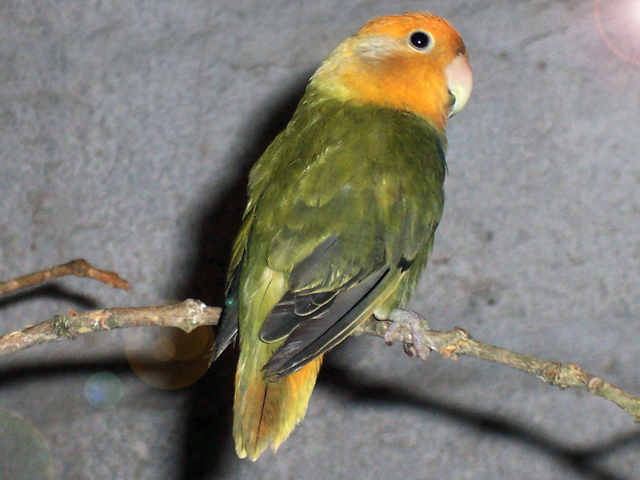
Opaline Double Dark factor mutation

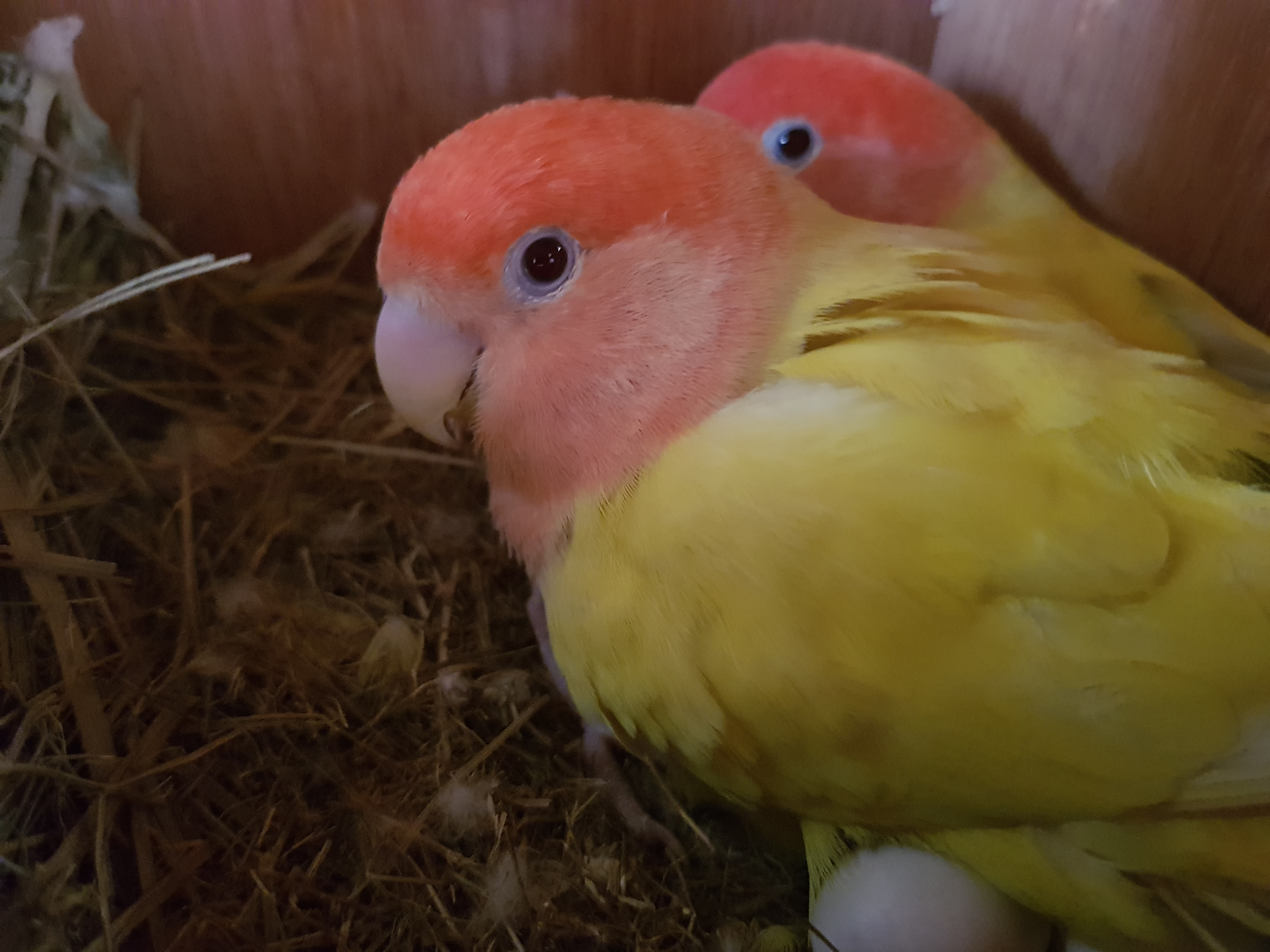
Lutino lovebirds with mutation where facial coloration covers entire head

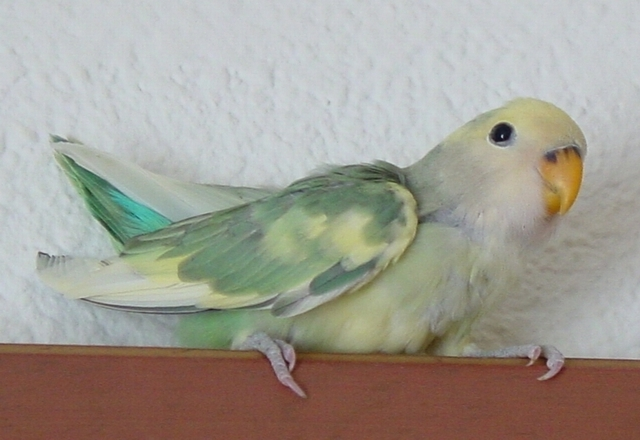
Aqua harlequin

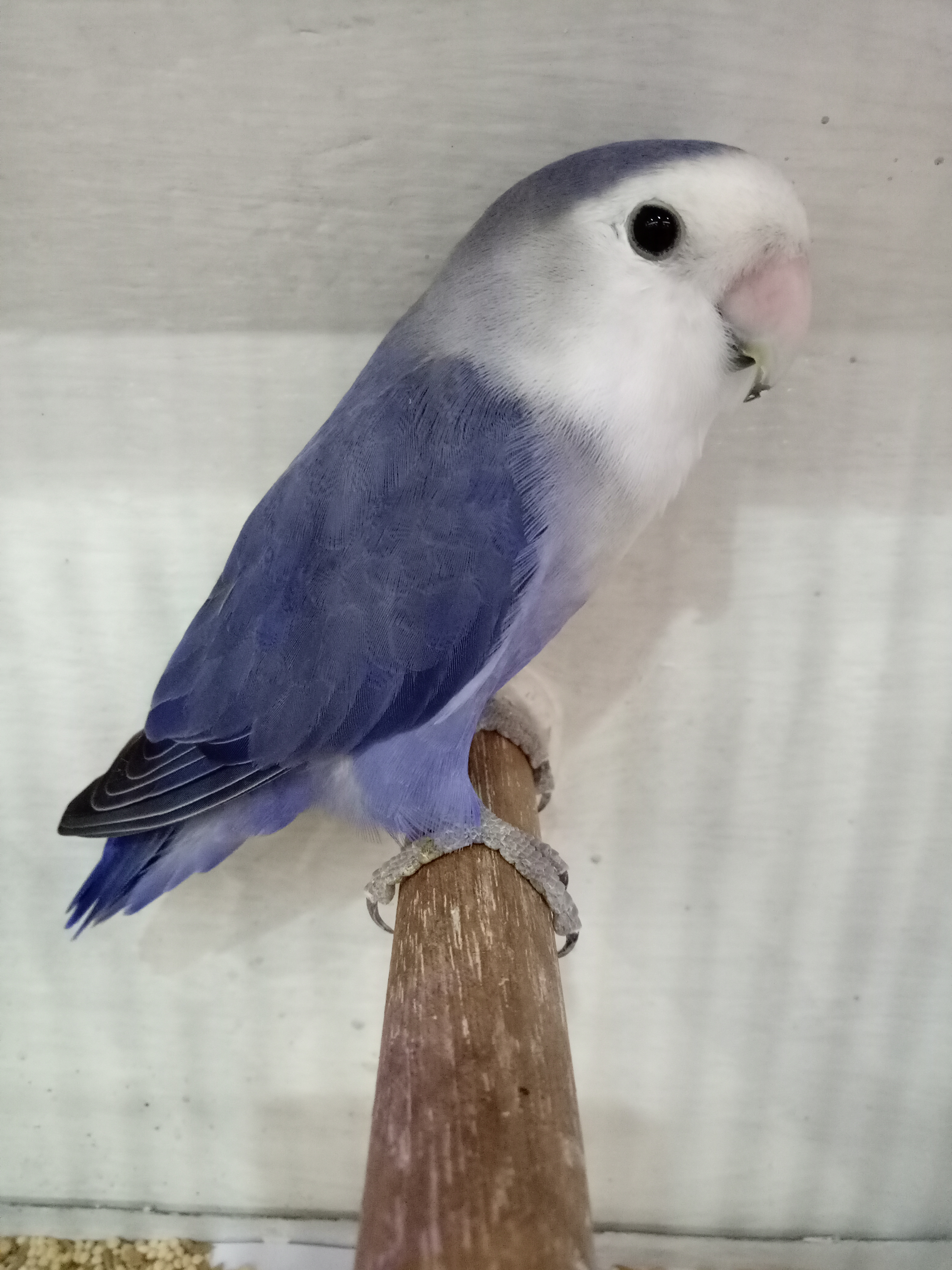
Whiteface violet

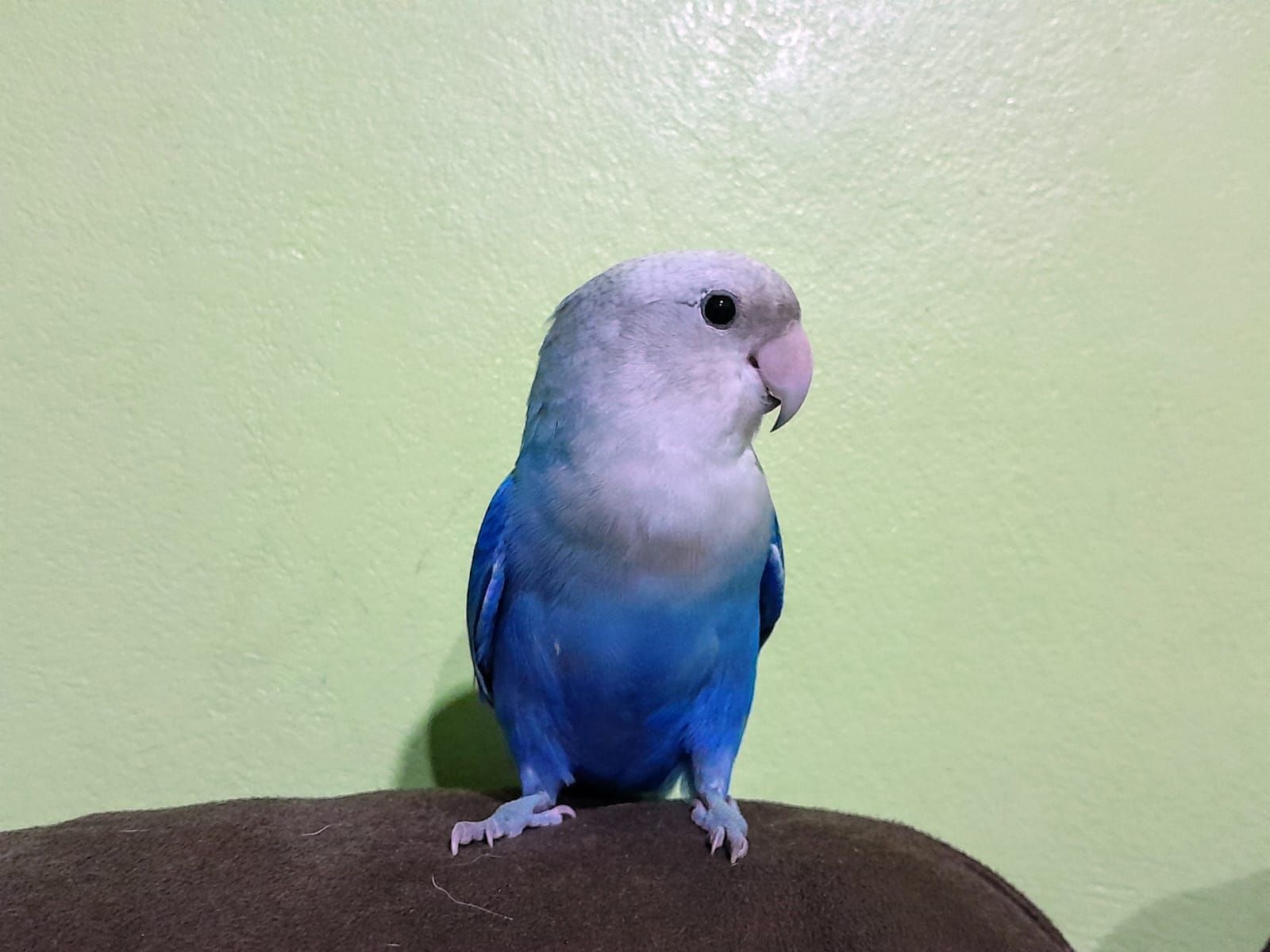
Whiteface violet with a bluish tone
