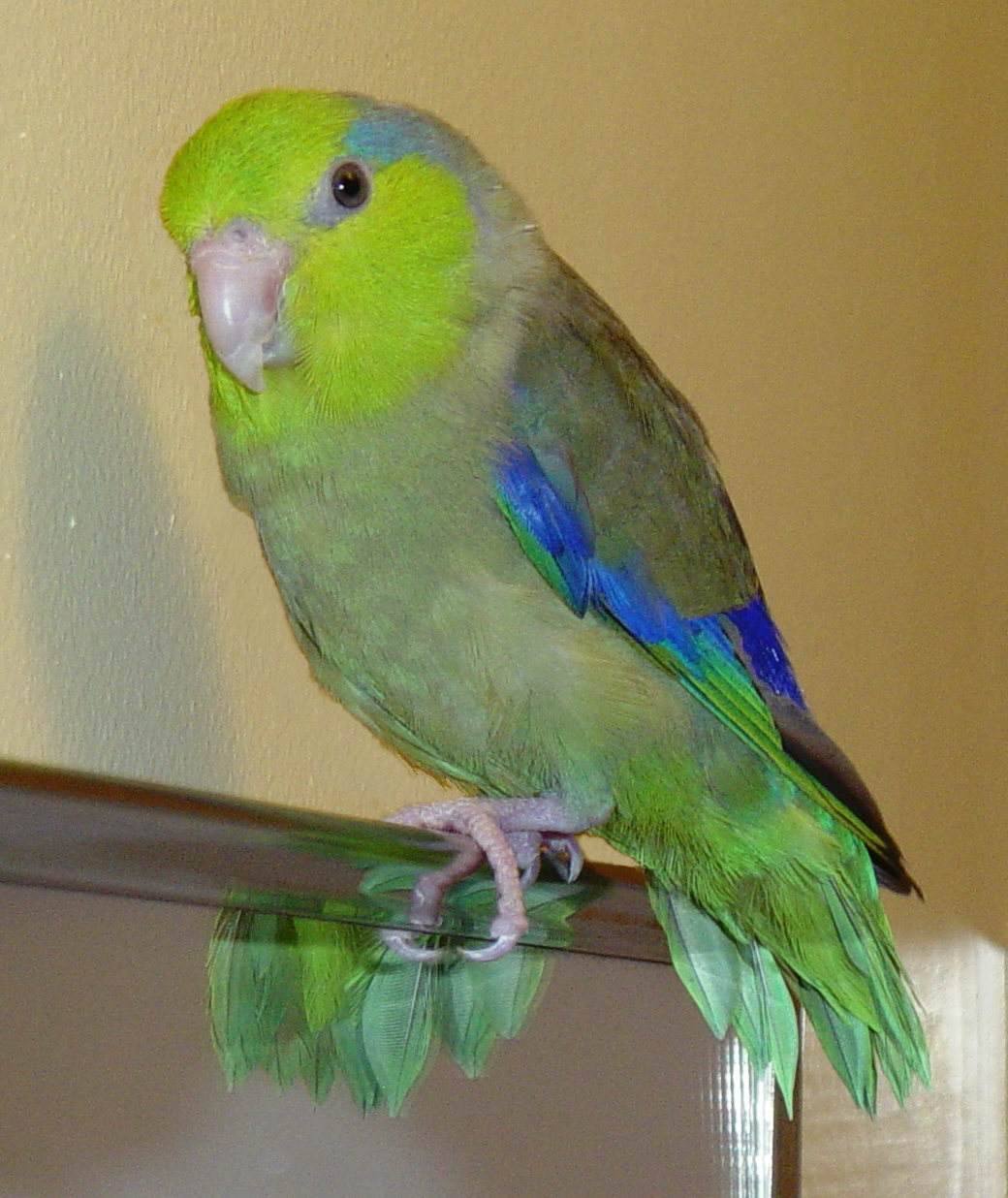
- A pet male Pacific parrotlet (Forpus coelestis)

Scientific classification
- Kingdom: Animalia
- Phylum: Chordata
- Class: Aves
- Order: Psittaciformes
- Family: Psittacidae
- Subfamily: Arinae
- Tribe: Arini

Groups included
- Forpus; Touit; Nannopsittaca

= Parrotlet =

Group of New World parrot species

Parrotlets are a group of the smallest New World parrot species, comprising several genera, namely Forpus, Nannopsittaca, and Touit. They have stocky builds and short tails and are endemic to Middle and South America. They resemble the lovebirds of Africa in size, body shape and behaviour and have sometimes been referred to as "South American lovebirds", but are not closely related.

In the wild, parrotlets travel in flocks ranging in size from about four to over a hundred birds. Most species travel in flocks of about five to forty. They form lifelong, tight pair bonds with their chosen mates.

== Behavior ==
If left alone for too long, a single parrotlet can lose some of its companionability. The Pacific parrotlet, in particular, does not understand that it is a tiny bird, and has little trouble challenging other animals and humans. Parrotlets in general are feisty, affectionate, and willful. Parrotlets should be housed separately due to their aggressive nature. Even bonded pairs have been known to kill or injure a mate; in one study, aggression was observed in 59% of "interindividual relationships aggressive interactions were recorded" and one individual was "significantly more aggressive" than the other in 35% of pairs. For this reason, most parrotlet species should not be kept in aviaries and it is best to keep them separate from other species.

== Parrotlet species ==
The following species within three genera are considered to be parrotlets:

=== Forpus ===
- Mexican parrotlet (Forpus cyanopygius)
- Green-rumped parrotlet (Forpus passerinus)
- Cobalt-rumped parrotlet (Forpus xanthopterygius)
- Turquoise-winged parrotlet (Forpus spengeli)
- Riparian parrotlet (Forpus crassirostris)
- Spectacled parrotlet (Forpus conspicillatus)
- Dusky-billed parrotlet or Sclater's parrotlet (Forpus modestus)
- Pacific parrotlet or celestial parrotlet (Forpus coelestis)
- Yellow-faced parrotlet (Forpus xanthops)

=== Touit ===
The Touit parrotlets are a genus of parrotlets found in the Venezuela-Guyana area, the northern Andes, and Bahia. Only three of the seven species have ever been brought into aviculture, none successfully.

- Lilac-tailed parrotlet (Touit batavicus)
- Scarlet-shouldered parrotlet (Touit huetii)
- Red-fronted parrotlet (Touit costaricensis - sometimes included in T. dilectissimus)
- Blue-fronted parrotlet or red-winged parrotlet (Touit dilectissimus)
- Sapphire-rumped parrotlet (Touit purpuratus)
- Brown-backed parrotlet (Touit melanonotus)
- Golden-tailed parrotlet (Touit surdus)
- Spot-winged parrotlet (Touit stictopterus)

=== Nannopsittaca ===
There are only two species in the genus Nannopsittaca.

- Tepui parrotlet (Nannopsittaca panychlora)
- Manu parrotlet or Amazonian parrotlet (Nannopsittaca dachilleae)
