= Green Parrot =

Green Parrot may refer to:

- Norfolk parakeet
- Scaly-breasted lorikeet

== See also ==
- Amazon parrot
- Green parakeet
- Green rosella
- Pacific parrotlet
- Rose-ringed parakeet
