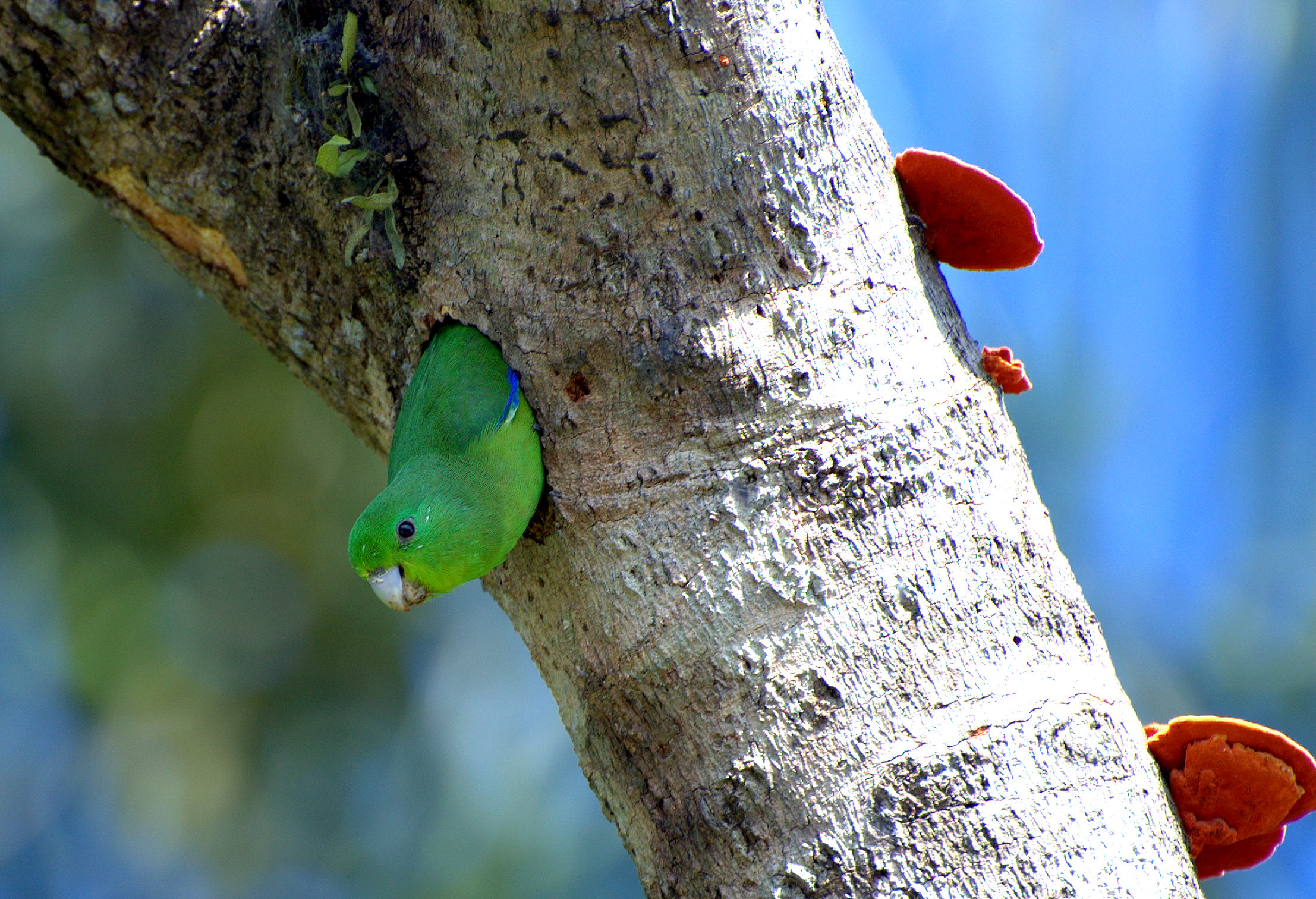
- Male cobalt-rumped parrotlet (Forpus xanthopterygius)

Scientific classification
- Kingdom: Animalia
- Phylum: Chordata
- Class: Aves
- Order: Psittaciformes
- Family: Psittacidae
- Subfamily: Arinae
- Tribe: Forpini
- Genus: Forpus; Boie, F, 1858

Type species
- Psittacus passerinus (green-rumped parrotlet) Linnaeus, 1758

Species
- 9; see text

= Forpus =

Genus of birds

Forpus is a genus of neotropical parrots in the family Psittacidae. It is the only genus in the Forpini tribe of the subfamily Arinae.

== Taxonomy ==
The genus Forpus was introduced in 1858 by the German zoologist Friedrich Boie. The type species was subsequently designated as the green-rumped parrotlet. The etymology of the genus name is unknown.

The genus contains nine species:

- Mexican parrotlet (Forpus cyanopygius)
  - Grayson's parrotlet or Tres Marias parrotlet (Forpus cyanopygius insularis)
- Green-rumped parrotlet (Forpus passerinus)
  - Colombian green-rumped parrotlet or Rio Hacha parrotlet (Forpus passerinus cyanophanes)
  - Trinidad green-rumped parrotlet or Venezuelan parrotlet (Forpus passerinus viridissimus)
  - Roraima green-rumped parrotlet or Schlegel's parrotlet (Forpus passerinus cyanochlorus)
  - Amazon green-rumped parrotlet or delicate parrotlet or Santarem passerine parrotlet (Forpus passerinus deliciosus)
- Cobalt-rumped parrotlet (Forpus xanthopterygius)
  - Salvadori's cobalt-rumped parrotlet (Forpus xanthopterygius flavescens)
  - Hellmayr's cobalt-rumped parrotlet (Forpus xanthopterygius flavissimus)
- Turquoise-winged parrotlet (Forpus spengeli)
- Riparian parrotlet (Forpus crassirostris)
- Spectacled parrotlet (Forpus conspicillatus)
  - Cauca spectacled parrotlet (Forpus conspicillatus caucae)
  - Venezuelan spectacled parrotlet (Forpus conspicillatus metae)
- Dusky-billed parrotlet or Sclater's parrotlet (Forpus modestus)
  - Forpus modestus sclateri
- Pacific parrotlet (Forpus coelestis)
- Yellow-faced parrotlet (Forpus xanthops)

== Description ==
Because of similarities to their larger parrot relatives and their small size, Forpus birds are often called parrotlets.

Forpus parrotlets are relatively small birds. Species range between 11–14.5 centimetres (4.3–5.7 in) long and typically weigh 30–35 grams (1.1–1.2 oz).

Forpus species are sexually dimorphic. Most males are bright green or yellow-green, with bright blue markings on their wings, tails, rumps, and heads (location varies between species). Females are duller green with more yellow-green markings and have few or no blue feathers. Forpus parrotlets have dark brown eyes with light peach or tan feet and beaks (with the exception of the dusky-billed parrotlet, which has a darker beak and feet). Like all parrots, Forpus species exhibit zygodactyly, meaning two toes face forwards and two face backwards.

== Distribution and habitat ==
All Forpus species are found in Latin, Central, or South America, and some species have been introduced on various Caribbean islands. Mexican parrotlets are found the furthest north, in western Mexico, while cobalt-rumped parrotlets have the southernmost range, extending into southern Brazil and Argentina. All other species are found between these two ranges, mostly in Peru, Ecuador, and Colombia.

Forpus species tend to live in subtropical and tropical dry forests, but are also found in shrublands, savannas, and heavily deforested or degraded forest areas. They are not found at altitudes higher than 1,800 metres (5,900 ft), though most species remain far below.

Forpus species are non-migratory, though some populations of cobalt-rumped parrotlets are known to locally migrate to follow ripening fruit and budding trends. Some cobalt-rumped parrotlet populations are also known to be altitudinal migrants.

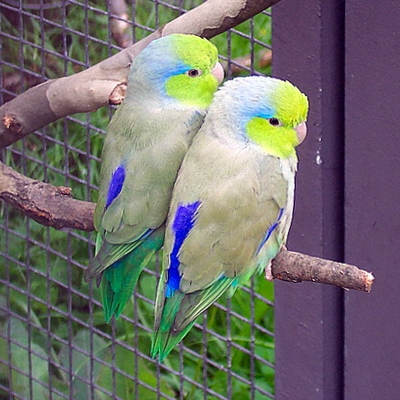
Two male Pacific parrotlets (Forpus coelestis)

== Behavior ==
=== Social ===
Forpus species often flock in groups of up to 100 individuals to socialize and feed; they are very gregarious. They have complex social relationships, and many species (especially spectacled parrotlets) have individually specific greeting calls (sometimes called "names") to recognize one another.

=== Reproduction ===
Most species nest in small holes or openings in trees, fenceposts, or similar objects. They have been known to use old nests created by various unrelated species. Clutch sizes range from 3-7 small, white, elliptical or spherical eggs. Most species breed between March and November, but some species' breeding habits are not well enough studied to know this for sure.

=== Diet ===
The typical Forpus diet includes berries and fruits, seeds, leaves, flowers, buds, and other plant matter, possibly including nectar. Some species have been observed licking or eating clay from naturally occurring clay mounds, a behavior which is thought to serve a similar purpose as a salt lick: the clay is a reliable source of minerals, such as calcium, that are important for birds to remain healthy.

== Conservation ==
Most Forpus species are listed as Least Concern by the IUCN Red List, with the exception of the Mexican parrotlet, which is Near Threatened and has a decreasing population, and the yellow-faced parrotlet, which is Vulnerable and has a stable population. This is because of increases in the illegal parrot trade - birds are captured and sold as pets in Mexico, the U.S., and other countries. This goes directly against the Wild Bird Conservation Act, CITES, and other species protection legislation.

Every other species of Forpus parrotlet is believed to have stable populations. Some species, such as the spectacled parrotlet, are even believed to be increasing in population. This is because parrotlets prefer low-density woodland or open spaces rather than densely forested areas, and deforestation has increased in many of their ranges.

Across all Forpus ranges, there are many conservation sites or protected areas already in place.

== Aviculture ==
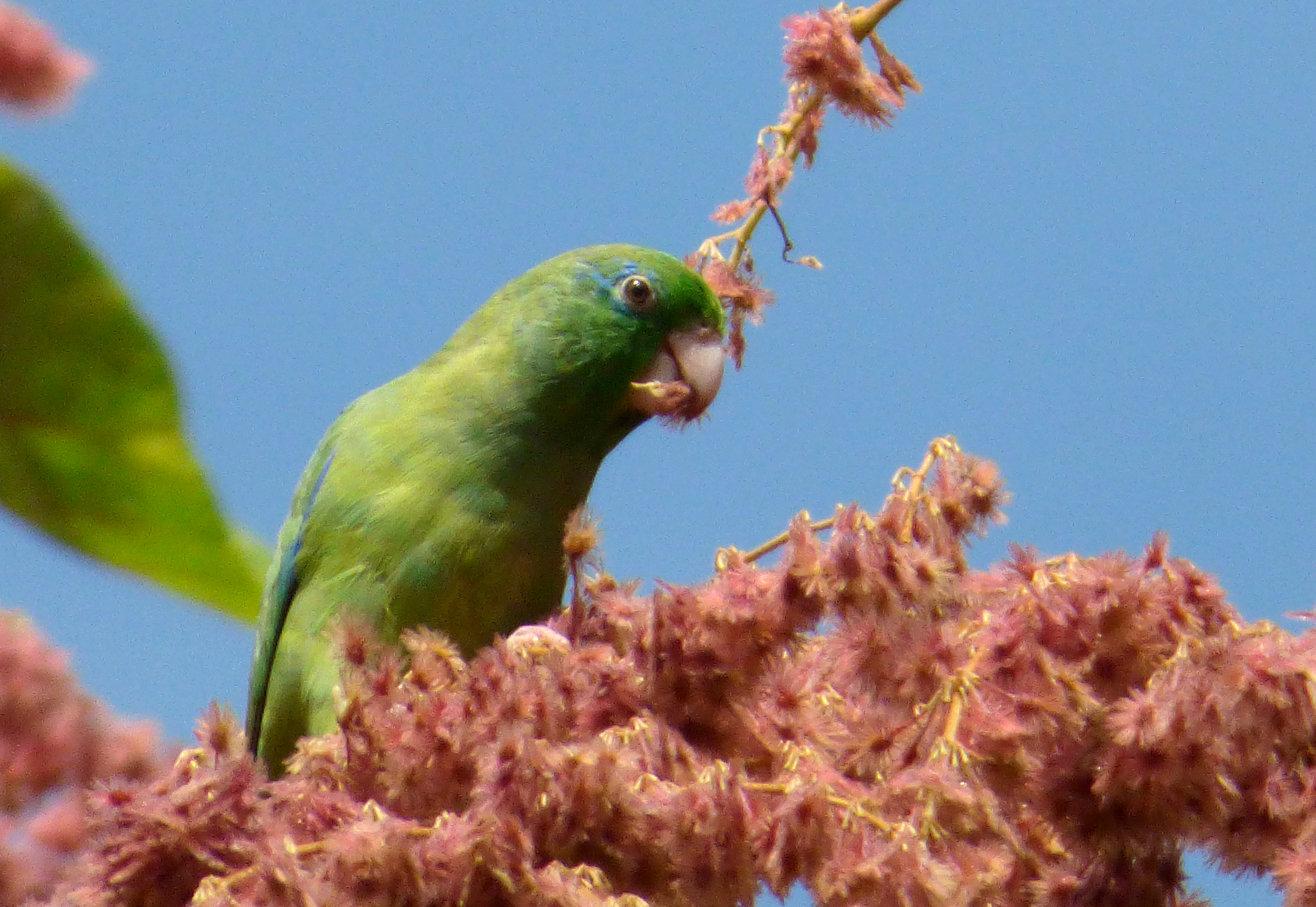
Spectacled parrotlet (Forpus conspicillatus)

Many species in the genus Forpus are commonly kept as pets. These parrotlets are very social and may show signs of depression if kept alone, unless they have frequent contact with humans. Forpus parrots, especially males, can be very loud and need space to fly and roam. Like any other parrot, they usually spend their time socializing with their partner. These parrotlets enjoy chewing on calcium treats, wood (bark, e.g. corkbark), and porous rocks. Due to their curiosity, exposure to toxic material like plastic, toxic plants, and chemically treated objects should be strictly avoided, especially galvanized wires (falsely used as cheap material for aviaries) which have led to many cases of toxidrome.

Forpus parrotlets are not easy to breed as they are extremely aggressive and will sometimes kill or severely maim their partners.

Mexican, spectacled, and yellow-faced parrotlets are rarer in the U.S. but are more common as pets in other countries. Dusky-billed parrotlets, more commonly known as Sclater's parrotlets, are extremely rare and are only found in captivity in Europe. Some Forpus species, such as the Pacific parrotlet, have several color mutations that are selectively bred for as pets.

== Gallery ==
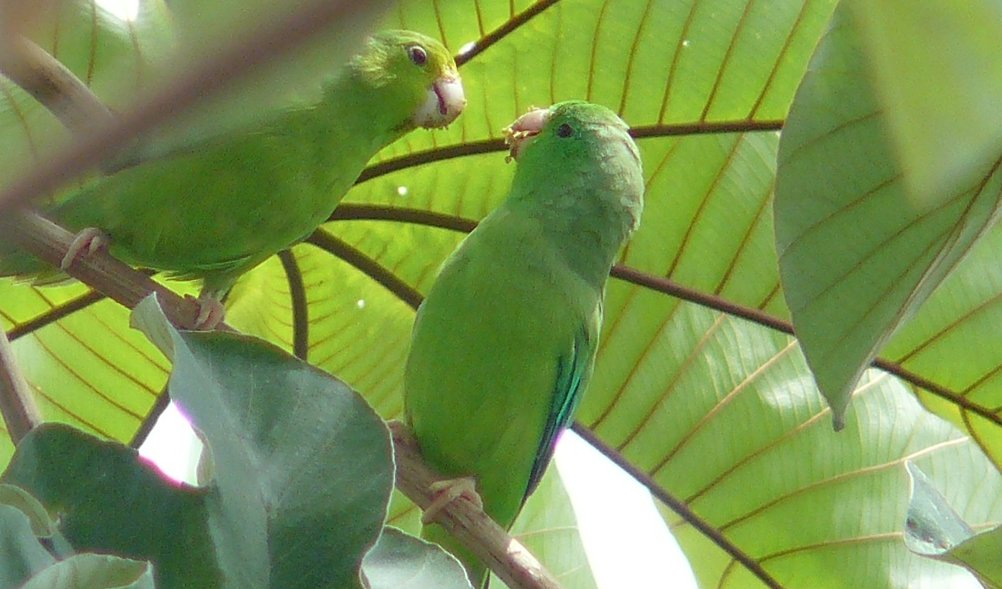
Green-rumped parrotlet (Forpus passerinus)

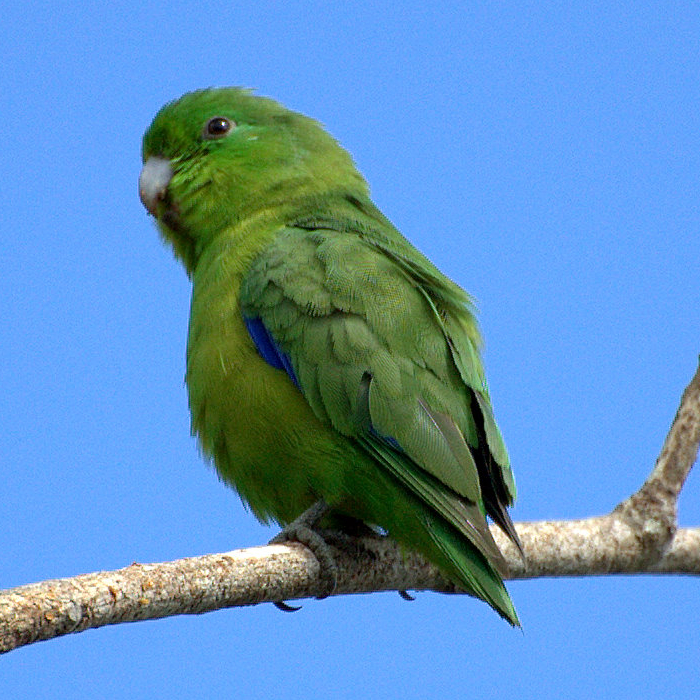
Cobalt-rumped parrotlet
(Forpus xanthopterygius)

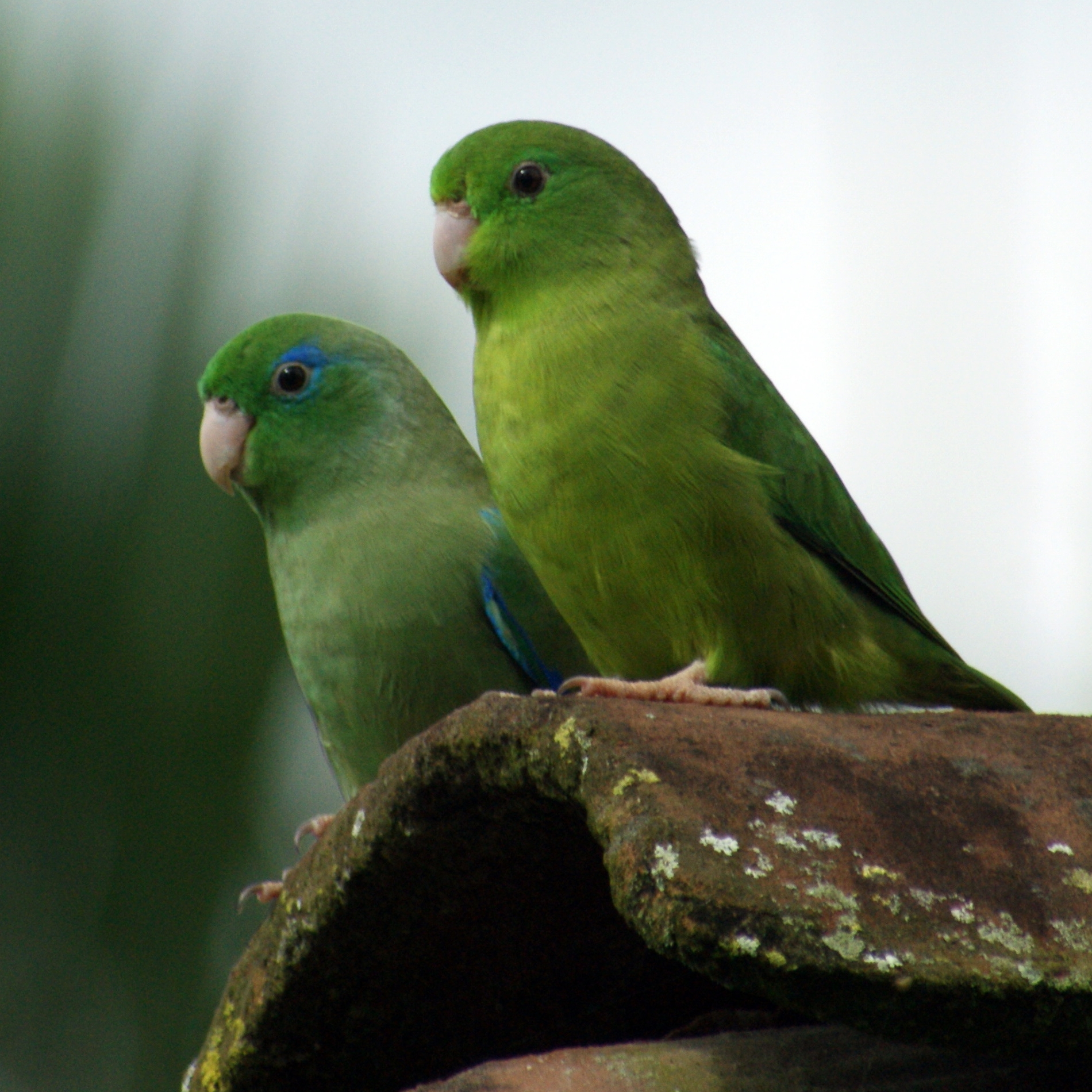
Spectacled parrotlet
(Forpus conspicillatus)

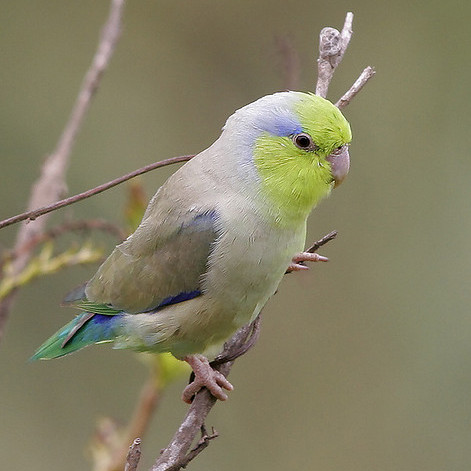
Pacific parrotlet
(Forpus coelestis)

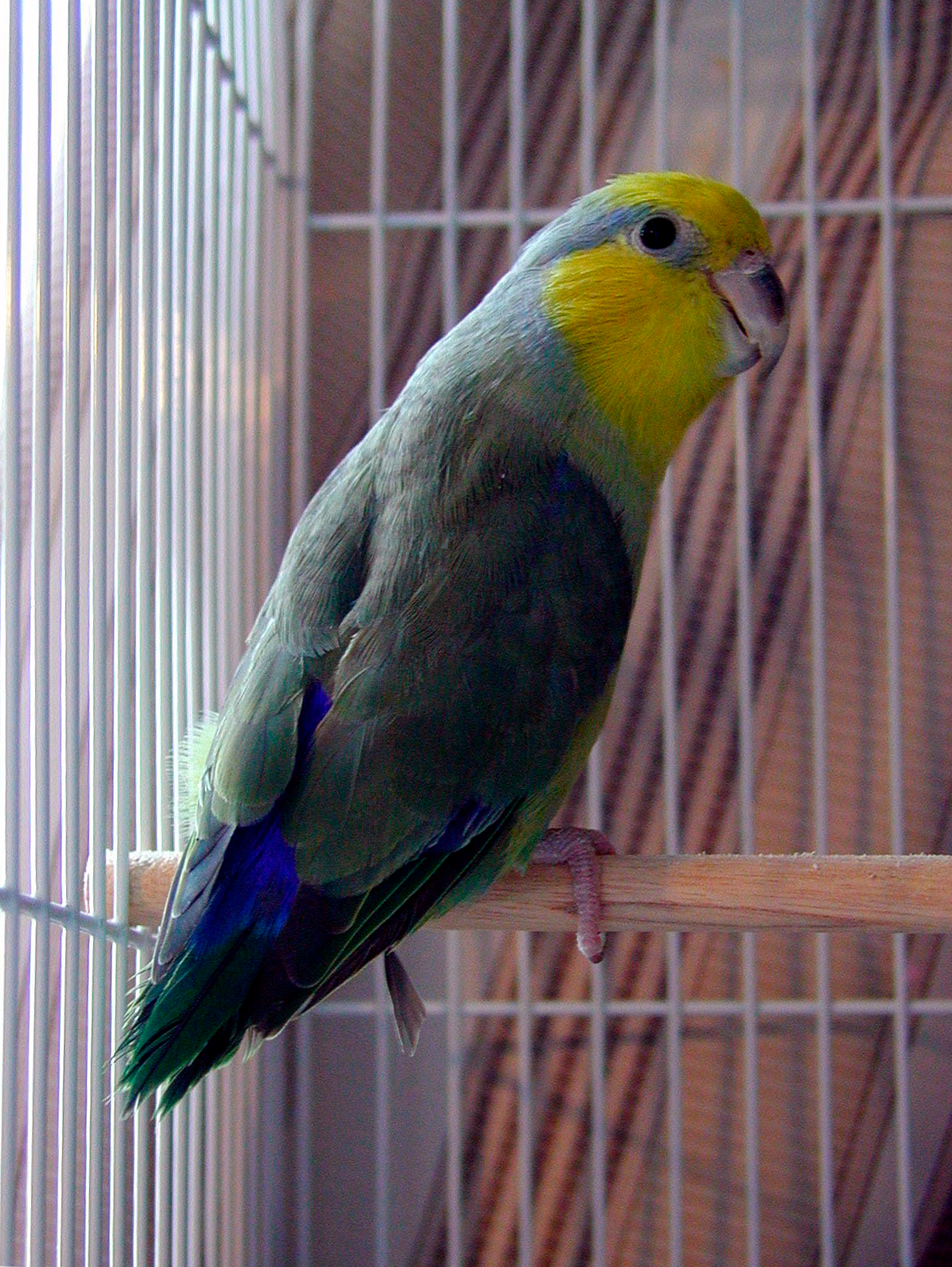
Yellow-faced parrotlet
(Forpus xanthops)

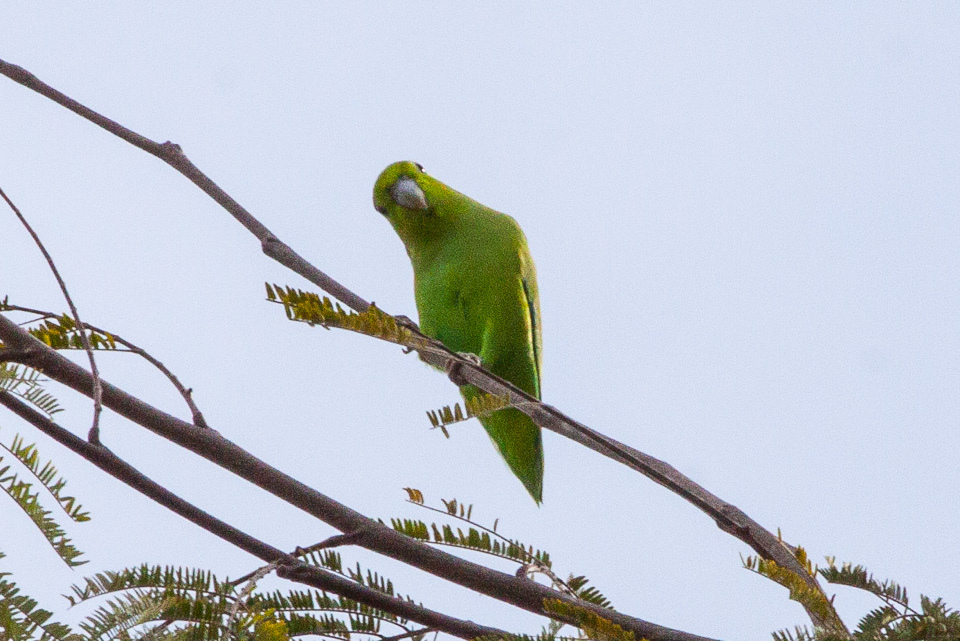
Mexican parrotlet (Forpus cyanopygius)

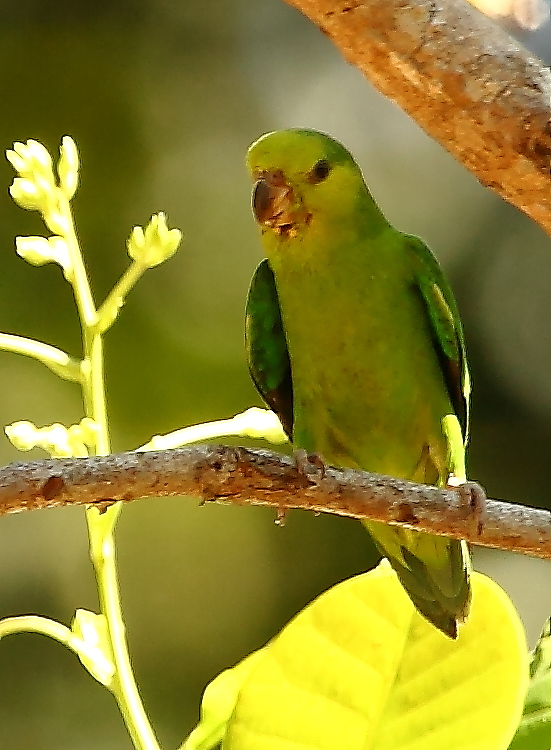
Dusky-billed parrotlet (Forpus modestus)

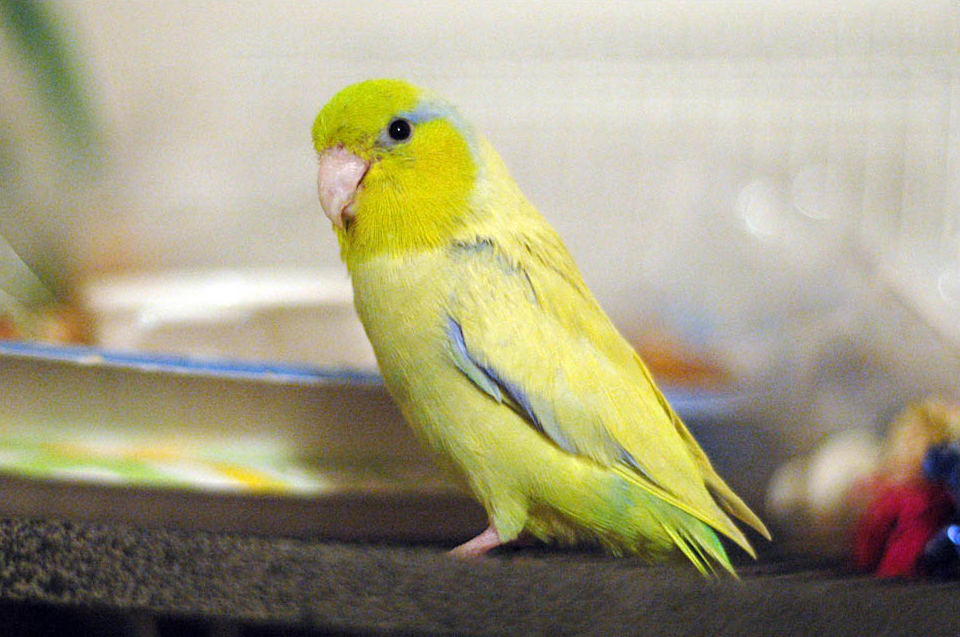
Pacific parrotlet (Forpus coelestis), captive yellow mutation
