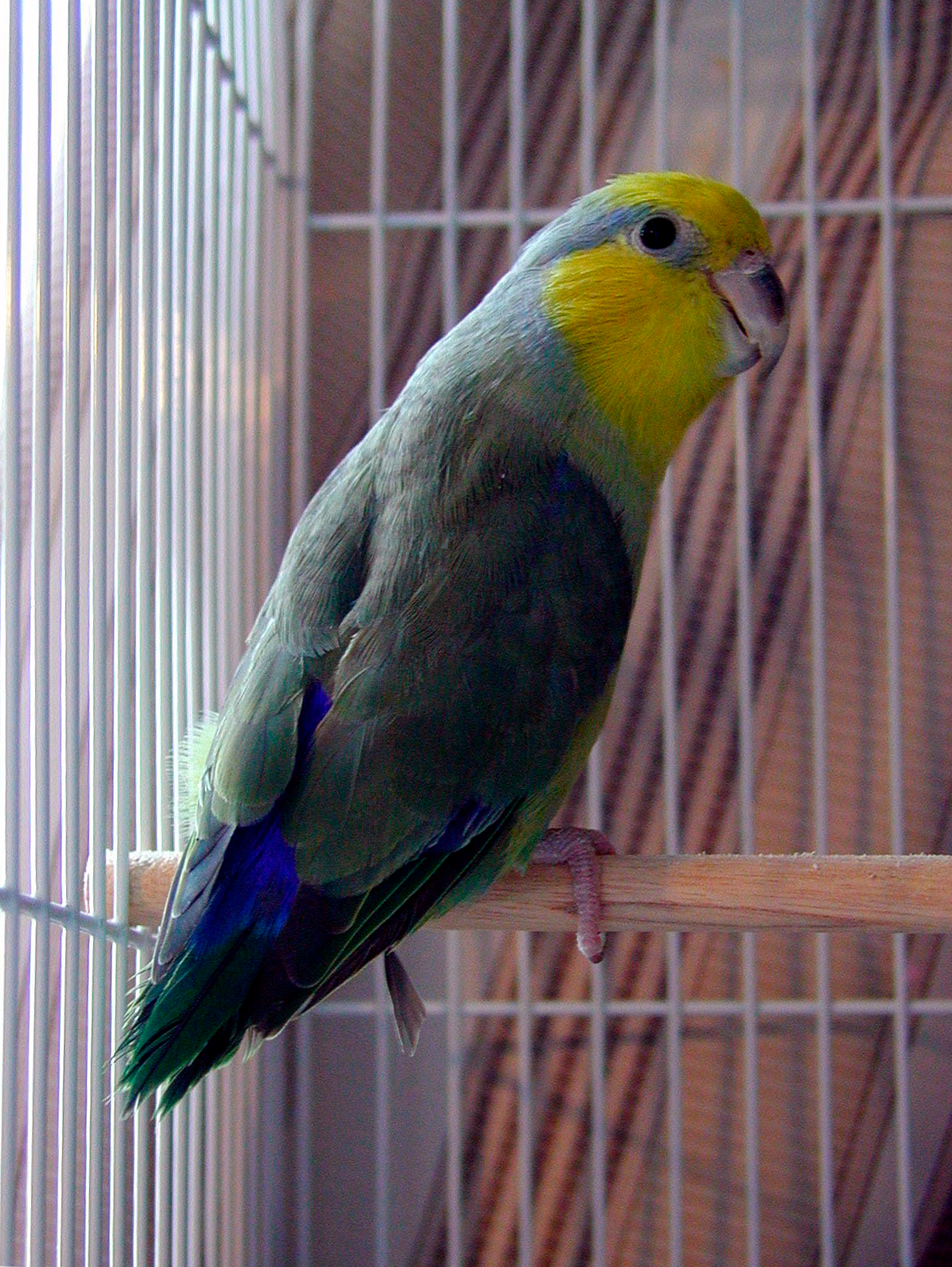
- Adult male

Conservation status
- Vulnerable (IUCN 3.1)

Scientific classification
- Kingdom: Animalia
- Phylum: Chordata
- Class: Aves
- Order: Psittaciformes
- Family: Psittacidae
- Genus: Forpus
- Species: F. xanthops

Binomial name
- Forpus xanthops (Salvin, 1895)

= Yellow-faced parrotlet =

Species of bird

The yellow-faced parrotlet (Forpus xanthops) is a species of parrot in the family Psittacidae.

== Description ==
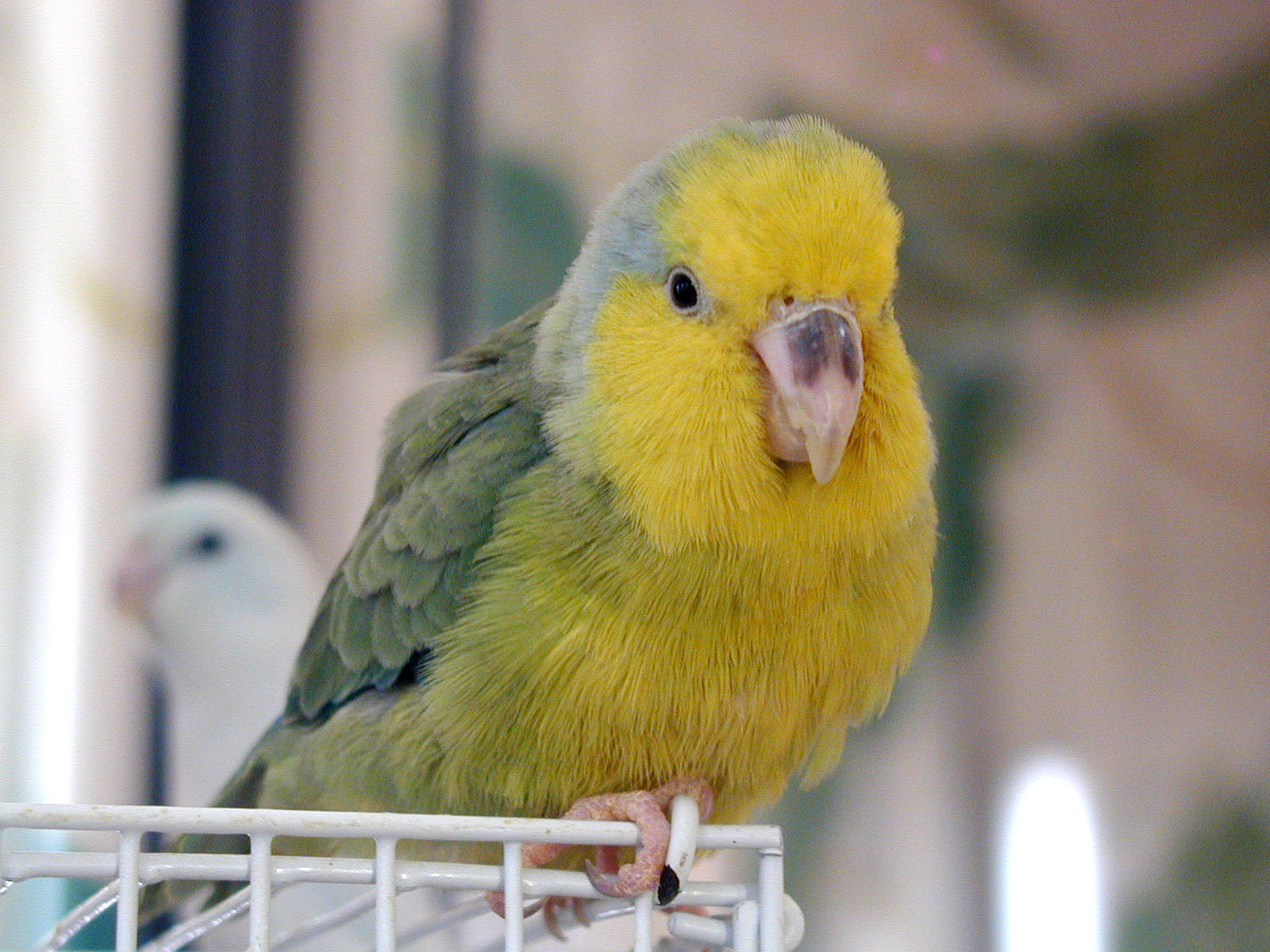
A pet parrotlet

Yellow-faced parrotlets are about 14.5 cm (5.7 in) long and weigh about 35 grams (1.2 oz). Their bodies are mostly dark or olive green with gray washes on the nape and mantle and yellow-green underparts, and foreheads, crown, cheeks, and throat are bright yellow. A gray-green stripe extends backwards from each eye. Eyes are dark brown and feet and lower mandibles are light peach. The upper mandible is light peach with a gray or darker brown base. Yellow-faced parrotlets are sexually dimorphic: males have bright blue lower backs, tail, secondary, and underwing coverts, and inner primary feathers. Females' blue feathers are lighter on their backs and rumps, with blue-tinged green coverts, secondaries, and primaries.

Juveniles of the species look similar to adults, but are duller and have fewer yellow feathers and an entirely peach beak.

Like all parrots, yellow-faced parrotlets exhibit zygodactyly, meaning two toes face forward and two toes face backward.

== Distribution and habitat ==
Yellow-faced parrotlets are found in northwestern Peru in the upper Rio Marañón valley, from eastern La Libertad north to southeastern Cajamarca and southern Amazonas.

Yellow-faced parrotlets prefer arid, low-density woodlands in upper tropical and subtropical areas including scrub, riparian zones, open balsa woodland, cactus montane desert, and open country with scattered vegetation. They are found at altitudes of 800–1,000 metres (2,600–3,300 ft), and rarely up to 2,400 metres (7,900 ft) above sea level.

== Conservation ==
The yellow-faced parrotlet is currently listed as a Vulnerable species by the IUCN Red List. The number of mature individuals in the wild is estimated to be 250-999 birds as of October 2016.

=== Threats ===
The population size is currently stable, but birds are often trapped for the wild parrot trade. The mortality rate of this practice is estimated to be 40-100%. The construction of dams on the Rio Marañón is also a threat to yellow-faced parrotlet populations, as human activity tends to be detrimental to their habitat.

Yellow-faced parrotlets are protected, and international trade is prohibited by the Wild Bird Conservation Act and other legislation.

== Behavior and Ecology ==
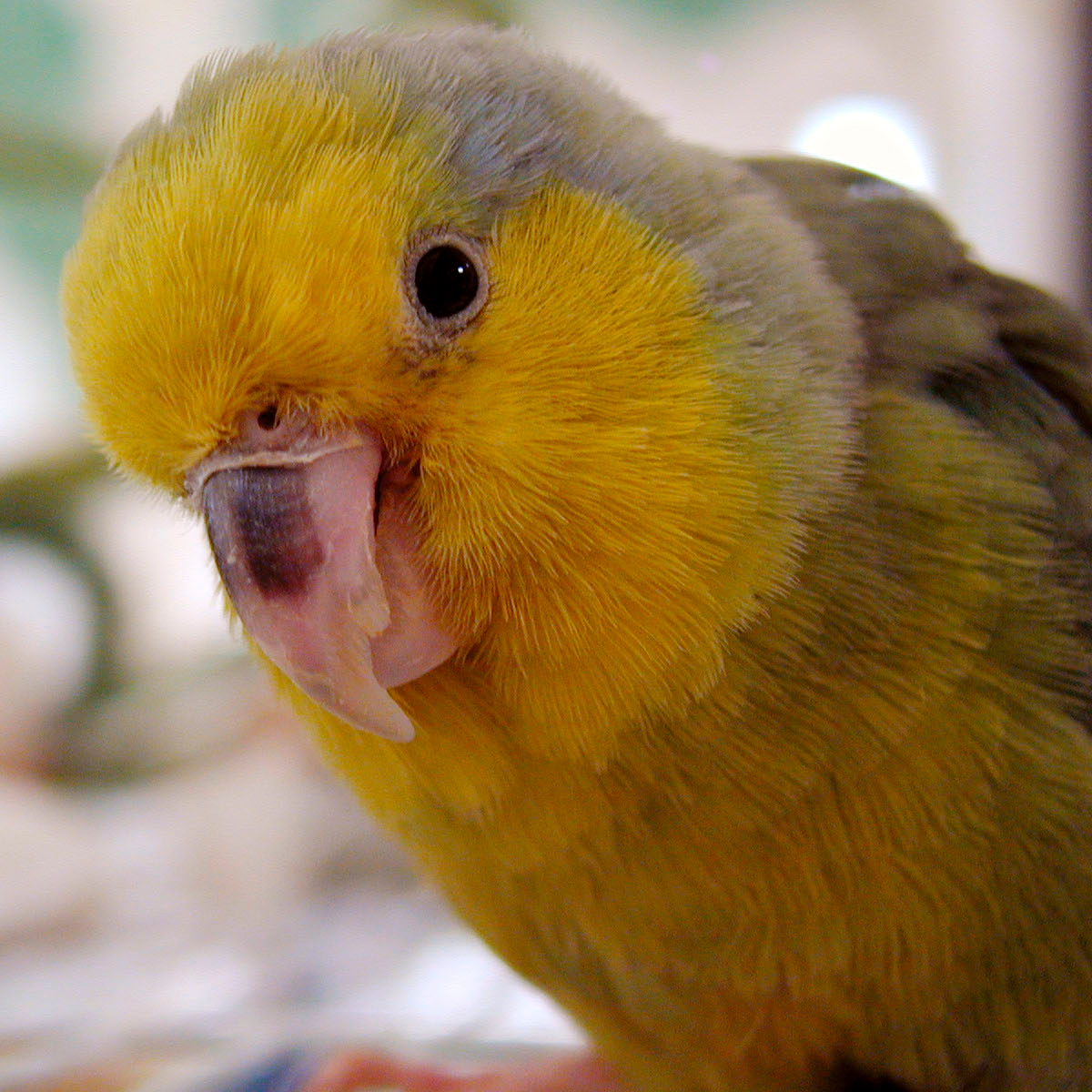
Detail of upper body

=== Social ===
Yellow-faced parrotlets are very social; they roost communally in flocks of up to 70 pairs.

Calls are quiet tweets and chirps.

=== Reproduction ===
Yellow-faced parrotlets typically breed between March and April; females lay clutches of 3-6 small white eggs. Yellow-faced parrotlets actually do not build nests but chew and rearrange wood shavings into shallow depressions on the ground.

=== Diet ===
Yellow-faced parrotlets mainly feed on cactus and tree fruits, seeds, flowers, and grass and wheat seeds.

== Aviculture ==
Because of their Vulnerable status, yellow-faced parrotlets are very rare in captivity. Illegal pet traders in its range capture wild birds every year, though this practice is not very lucrative and merits severe punishment. It is estimated that there are fewer than 50 captive yellow-faced parrotlets in the U.S., though this number is simply a guess. They are easy to breed in captivity, which aids many organizations, such as the International Parrotlet Society, in maintaining successful breeding programs in efforts to conserve this species.
