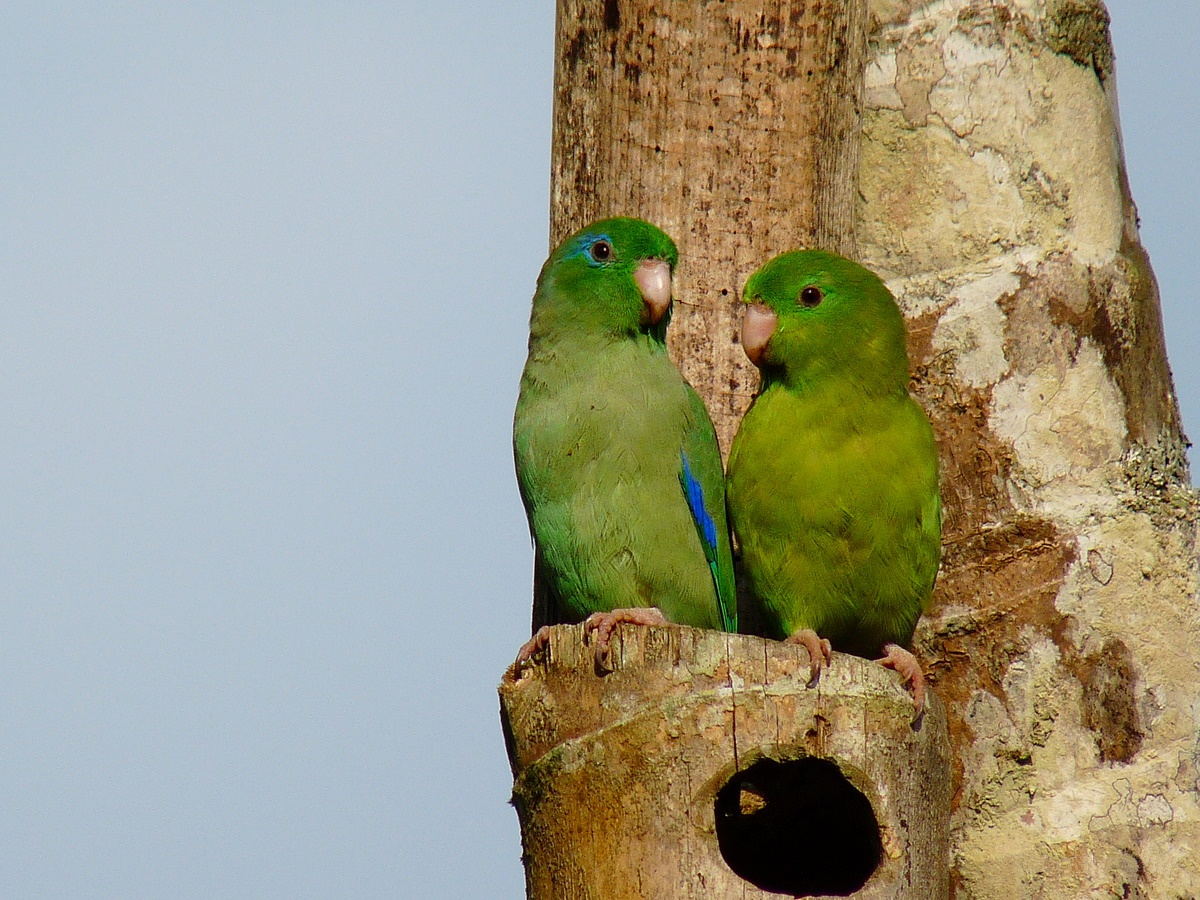
- A pair in Colombia (male left, female right)

Conservation status
- Least Concern (IUCN 3.1)

Scientific classification
- Kingdom: Animalia
- Phylum: Chordata
- Class: Aves
- Order: Psittaciformes
- Family: Psittacidae
- Genus: Forpus
- Species: F. conspicillatus

Binomial name
- Forpus conspicillatus (Lafresnaye, 1848)

Subspecies
- F. c. conspicillatus; F. c. caucae; F. c. metae

= Spectacled parrotlet =

Species of bird

The spectacled parrotlet (Forpus conspicillatus) is a species of parrot in the family Psittacidae.

There are three subspecies: F. c. conspicillatus, the Cauca spectacled parrotlet (F. c. caucae) and the Venezuelan spectacled parrotlet (F. c. metae).

== Description ==
Name	Appearance	Range
spectacled parrotlet (Forpus conspicillatus conspicillatus) (nominate subspecies)	Typically 12 centimetres (4.7 in) long and weigh about 30 grams (1.1 oz). Primarily green with gray-green breast and underparts with brighter green head. Eyes are dark brown and beak and feet are light peach. Spectacled parrotlets are sexually dimorphic: males have a bright blue ring around each eye, with purple-blue on lower back, rump, leading edge of wing, primary and secondary coverts, secondaries, and underwing coverts and axillaries; females have no blue markings but a bright emerald ring around each eye. Like all parrots, spectacled parrotlets exhibit zygodactyly, meaning two toes face forward and two face backward. Juveniles look like adults. Males have green feathers mixed in with their blue markings.	eastern Panama, west to the upper Rio Bayano; northern Colombia from the upper Rio Sinú valley and lower Rio Cauca valley east to western slopes of Cordillera Oriental in Boyacá and Cundinamarca
Cauca spectacled parrotlet (F. c. caucae)	Compared to the nominate species, males' blue markings are paler. Females' beaks are thicker.	western Colombia in upper Rio Cauca valley in Antioquia and Caldas; Rio Daguao valley and western slopes of Cordillera Occidental in Valle; Rio Patía valley in Cauca and Nariño, and coastal southwestern Nariño
Venezuelan spectacled parotlet (F. c. metae)	Males' blue rings extend further behind the eyes.	eastern slopes of Cordillera Oriental in Boyacá, Cundinamarca, and Meta, central Colombia, east through Vichada and Casanare to western Venezuela, along Rio Meta in western Apure

== Distribution and habitat ==
Spectacled parrotlets are endemic to Middle and South America, including northern and central Colombia, Venezuela, and eastern Panama (subspecies can be found in specific regions of Colombia and Venezuela, see above). Natural habitats are lowland evergreen forest edge, thorn scrub, llanos, gallery woodland, and heavily degraded former forest or low-density woodland. Spectacled parrotlets are not found at altitudes higher than 1,600 metres (5,200 ft) above sea level.

Green and blue coloring helps spectacled parrotlets camouflage with the tropical trees in their habitats. Though color mutations such as the yellow pied mutation may occur in captivity, they are rare in wild due to the fact that a brighter color compromises a bird's ability to hide from predators.

== Conservation ==
According to the IUCN Red List, spectacled parrotlets are of Least Concern. Their populations are stable and possibly increasing due to deforestation and land development, as they prefer open habitat rather than dense forest. There are many protected areas across their range.

== Behavior and ecology ==
=== Feeding ===
In the wild, spectacled parrotlets feed on seeds, nuts, leaves, berries, cactus, Tamarindus sp., and other fruits. Occasionally they may feed on small insects. They have also been observed licking or eating clay. These clay licks provide a good source of minerals, such as calcium.

=== Social ===
Spectacled parrotlets are highly social and live in small flocks, but can be seen in large flocks of up to 100 individuals on clay mounds drinking runoff or eating clay.

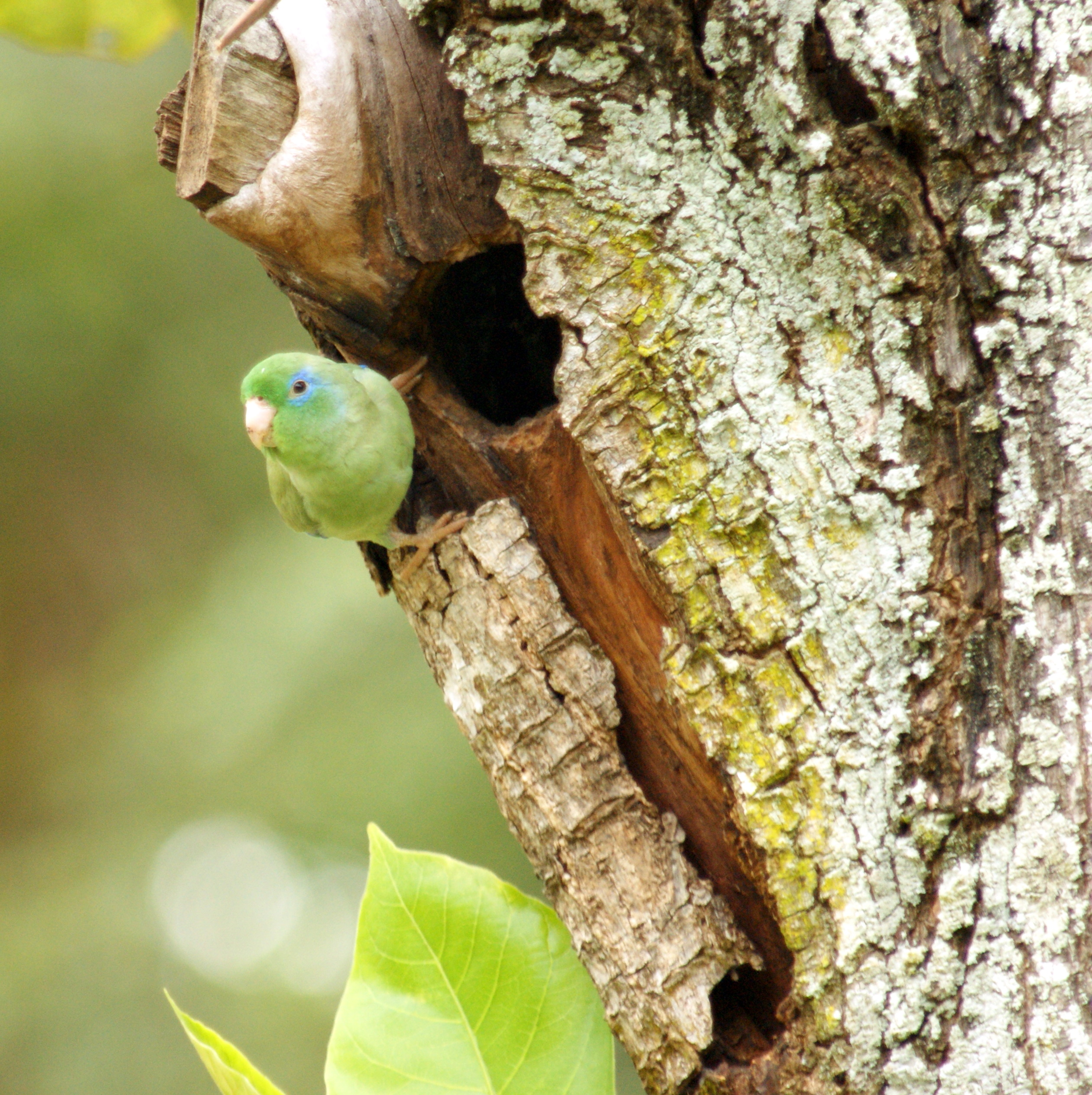
Male near nest entrance

=== Reproduction ===
The bright color of the male and specific mating calls attract the female to the male parrotlet. Spectacled parrotlets typically breed between January and March.

Spectacled parrotlets nest in tree cavities or similar structures. Often they will make use of abandoned tree hole or clay mountain nests created by other unrelated bird species, though they are also capable of creating new nests. The female incubates eggs while the male assumes the role of guarding the nest and feeding the female and chicks once they are hatched. Spectacled parrots are monogamous and some pairs may even mate for life.

Once a female lays one egg, she will lay another every two days until clutch size is reached. Typically, a couple will hatch 4–6 eggs per clutch after an 18-day incubation.

Babies fledge at about five weeks old, and siblings keep in close contact with one another for a few weeks post-fledging. Birds from the same clutch use specific calls and continue to feed each other and play until they are self-sufficient and mature.

=== Vocalizations ===
Spectacled parrotlets are able to differentiate between social companions and adapt their calls to mimic the call of the bird they are communicating with. Specific calls are used when communicating with other birds. These calls are sometimes described as "names."

Calls can range between tweeting, chirping or buzzing sounds, depending on the information being relayed.

In aviculture, pet spectacled parrotlets can learn to mimic their owners. Males are known to be better mimickers than females due to the instinctive nature of calling to attract a female mate in the wild.

== Aviculture ==
In recent years, spectacled parrotlets have become increasingly popular pets. Parrotlets can be held in captivity as breeding pairs or as a social companion.

=== Breeding pairs ===
Breeding pairs do not make good companion pets, as they cannot be handled if they are wanted for breeding. Pairs require a closed nest box in the place of a tree hole nest in the wild, in order to reproduce.

=== Hand-fed birds ===
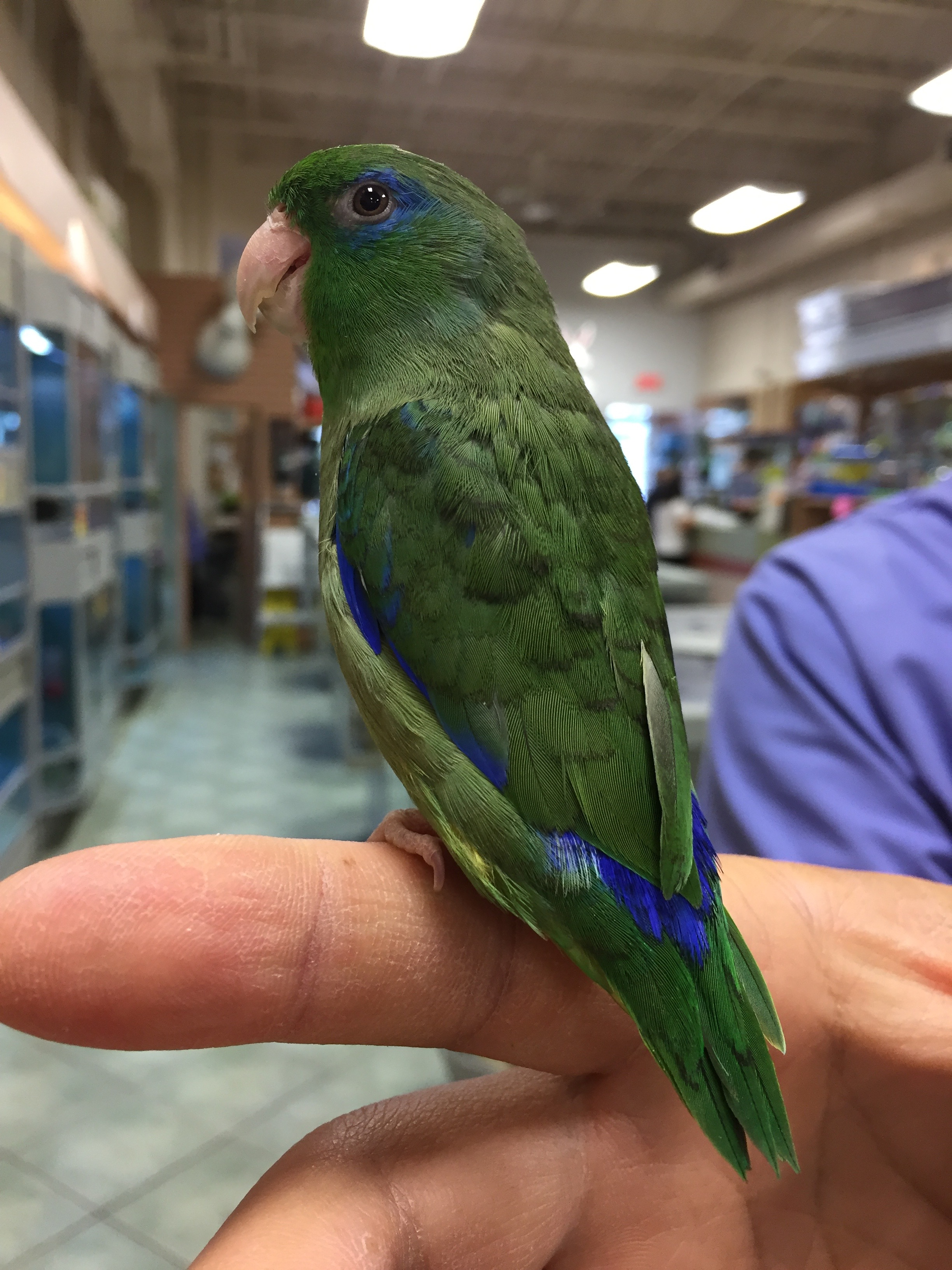
Hand-fed male spectacled parrotlet, 5 months old

Hand-fed parrotlets are much more popular in aviculture. Babies are taken from their nest at a few weeks old and fed a nutritionally rich pablum-like mash, rich in protein, fats, and minerals necessary for development. Chicks are fed using a syringe starting at three to four times per day. They consume 2–4 cubic centimetres (2.0–4.0 mL) of mash per feeding.

Feeding frequency and volume diminishes as the bird develops. By the age of four to six weeks, the parrotlet will have transitioned to mixed grains or pellets and eat enough on its own to sustain itself. Chicks that are continuously handled this way remain sociable and enjoy spending time out of the cage with their owners. If, however, after weaning, the bird is not regularly taken out of the cage, they may revert to a wild, nervous or aggressive temperament.

=== Requirements ===
Spectacled parrotlets require cages roughly 24" by 24" by 18", with perches of different sizes and textures to encourage nail filing and foot exercise. Toys, especially foraging toys, encourage active playing and chewing to exercise the beak.

Often, owners of spectacled parrotlets will clip the flight feathers as a safety precaution for the bird. Typically, the first six primaries are cut. These feathers grow back when the bird molts (roughly twice a year). Nails should be clipped every four months to prevent overgrowth and ensure comfortable perching.

A domesticated parrotlet's diet typically consists of mixed grains or pellets. Mixed grain diets usually consist of white millet, sunflower seeds, and a variety of other seeds. Pellets are often the preferred diet due to their high nutrition. Pellet diets are often enriched with proteins and minerals such as calcium to ensure the bird is getting the necessary minerals that it would naturally obtain from its diet in the wild.
