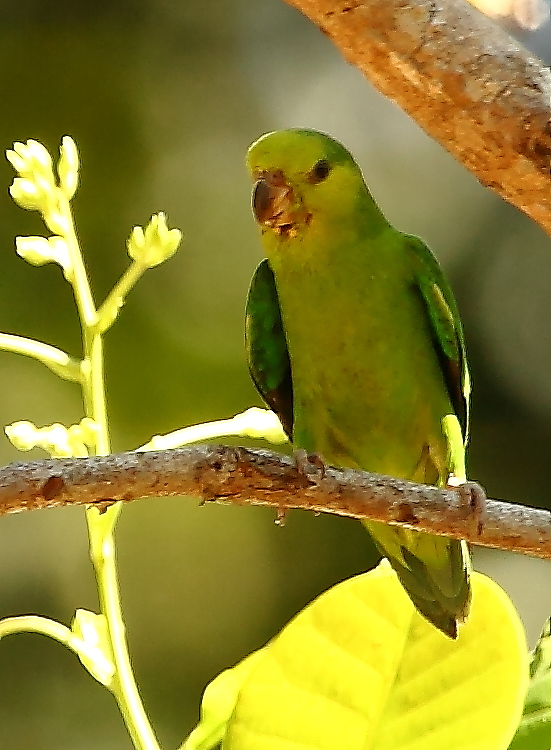
- At Alta Floresta, Mato Grosso State, Brazil

Conservation status
- Least Concern (IUCN 3.1)

Scientific classification
- Kingdom: Animalia
- Phylum: Chordata
- Class: Aves
- Order: Psittaciformes
- Family: Psittacidae
- Genus: Forpus
- Species: F. modestus

Binomial name
- Forpus modestus (Cabanis, 1849)

Subspecies
- F. m. modestus; F. m. sclateri

Synonyms
- Psittacula sclateri; Forpus sclateri

= Dusky-billed parrotlet =

Species of bird

The dusky-billed parrotlet (Forpus modestus), also known as Sclater's parrotlet, is a small species of parrot in the family Psittacidae. It is the nominate species (F. m. modestus).

There is one subspecies: Forpus modestus sclateri.

== Subspecies ==
Name	Description	Range
dusky-billed parrotlet or Sclater's parrotlet (Forpus modestus modestus)	Typically 12–12.5 centimetres (4.7–4.9 in) long and weigh 30–35 grams (1.1–1.2 oz). Body is mostly dark green to yellow-green; eyes are dark brown and feet are dark gray. Upper mandible is dark gray while lower is light peach. Dusky-billed parrotlets are sexually dimorphic: males have blue-purple feathers on their lower back, rump, primary and secondary coverts, primary and secondary feathers, and underwing coverts. Females have no blue markings and a brighter yellow-green forehead, forecrown, and cheeks. Like all parrots, dusky-billed parrotlets exhibit zygodactyly: two toes face forward and two toes face backward. Juveniles look like adults, with duller colorations. Males have green feathers mixed in with their blue markings.	from Belém, Pará, northern Brazil, west to southeastern Colombia, south to eastern Peru, western Brazil, and northern Bolivia
F. m. sclateri	Compared to the nominate species, males are paler green and have paler blue parkings. Females are also paler, particularly on the breast.	French Guiana, western Guyana, eastern and southern Venezuela, and northern Brazil to eastern Colombia

== Distribution and habitat ==
The dusky-billed parrotlet is found in the Amazon rainforest in South America, where it is locally fairly common; it also occurs in the Andes and the Amazonian foothills, the Amazon River outlet, and Marajo Island.

Dusky-billed parrotlets prefer lowland tropical rainforest edges and clearings, riparian zones, secondary habitats, and savanna. They seem to favor seasonally-flooding forests. They are not found at altitudes higher than 1,000 metres (3,300 ft) above sea level.

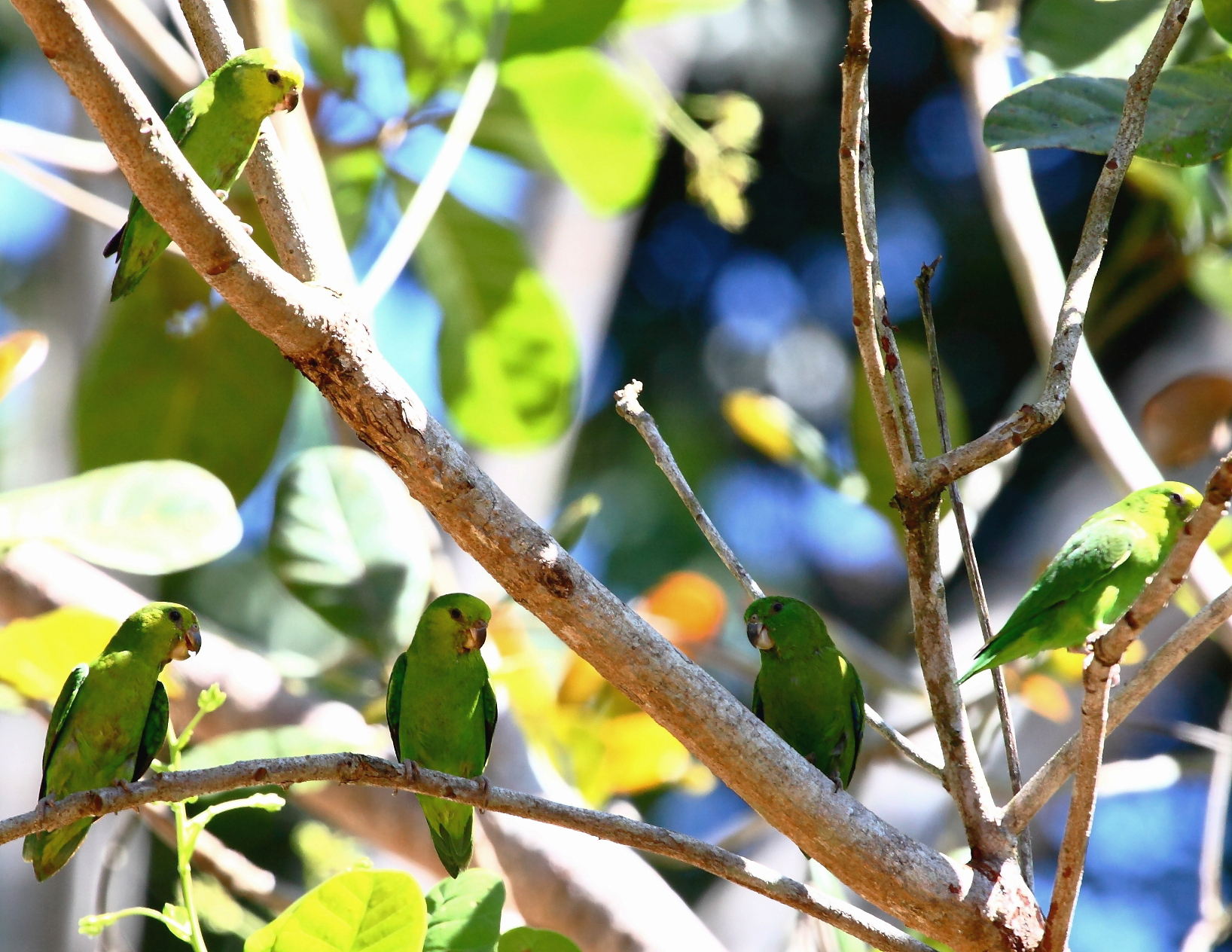
Dusky-billed parrotlets feeding in a group

== Conservation ==
According to the IUCN Red List, dusky-billed parrotlets are a species of Least Concern. Their population size is unknown, but is believed to be stable.

=== Threats ===
Unlike many members of the genus Forpus, they are not captured for the parrot trade, and they are relatively unaffected by deforestation. There are many protected areas throughout their range.

== Behavior ==
=== Social ===
Dusky-billed parrotlets are usually found in flocks of up to 100 birds outside of their breeding season; otherwise, they are seen mostly in pairs. They are very social, and conspicuous in their habitat. Calls are high-pitched notes or soft wheezing sounds, made while in flight or perched.

=== Reproduction ===
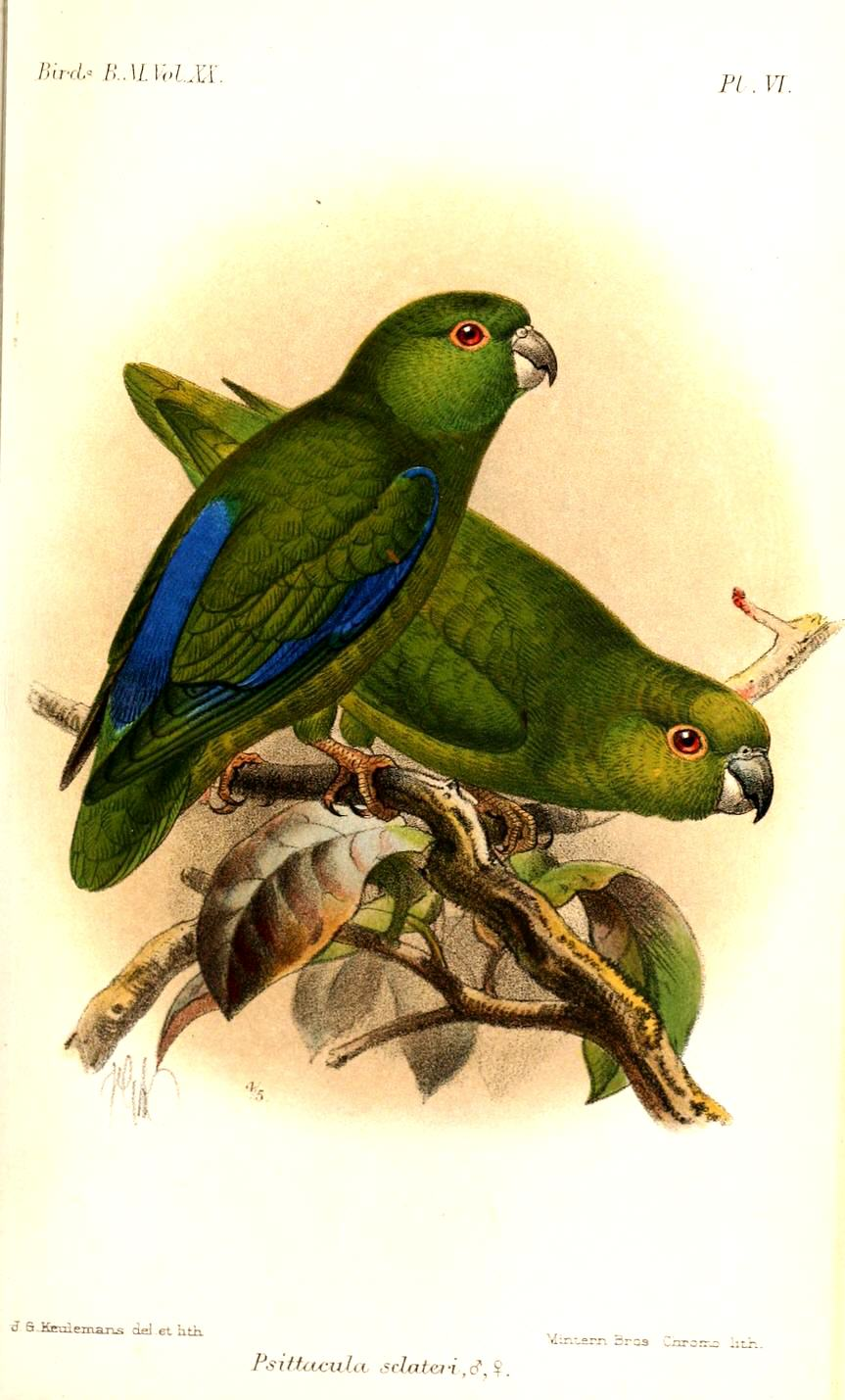
Forpus modestus plate by Keulemans, 1891

Dusky-billed parrotlets typically breed during July. Clutch size is unknown, but eggs are small, white, and roughly spherical. They nest in tree cavities or similar structures.

=== Diet ===
Dusky-billed parrotlets' diet consists of approximately 10% seeds, buds, and blossoms and 90% berries and fruits,. Grass is occasionally eaten as well. Dusky-billed parrotlets have also been observed to eat clay as a primary source of minerals.

== Taxonomy ==
The dusky-billed parrotlet was previously described by the name Forpus sclateri by Jean Cabanis in 1849 but later reassigned to the genus Psittacula as Psittacula modesta by George Robert Gray in 1859. However, because the name modesta was assigned to at least two closely related birds of the genus Psittacula, the dusky-billed parrotlet was reverted to F. sclateri. As of 2006, the binomial name for the dusky-billed parrotlet is Forpus modestus, with F. m. sclateri as a subspecies.

It has been suggested that the dusky-billed parrotlet is basal to all other species of the genus Forpus based on diversification and speciation rates and patterns.

== Aviculture ==
The dusky-billed parrotlet is not commonly available in aviculture. It is not commercially available in the U.S. and is very uncommon in Europe.
