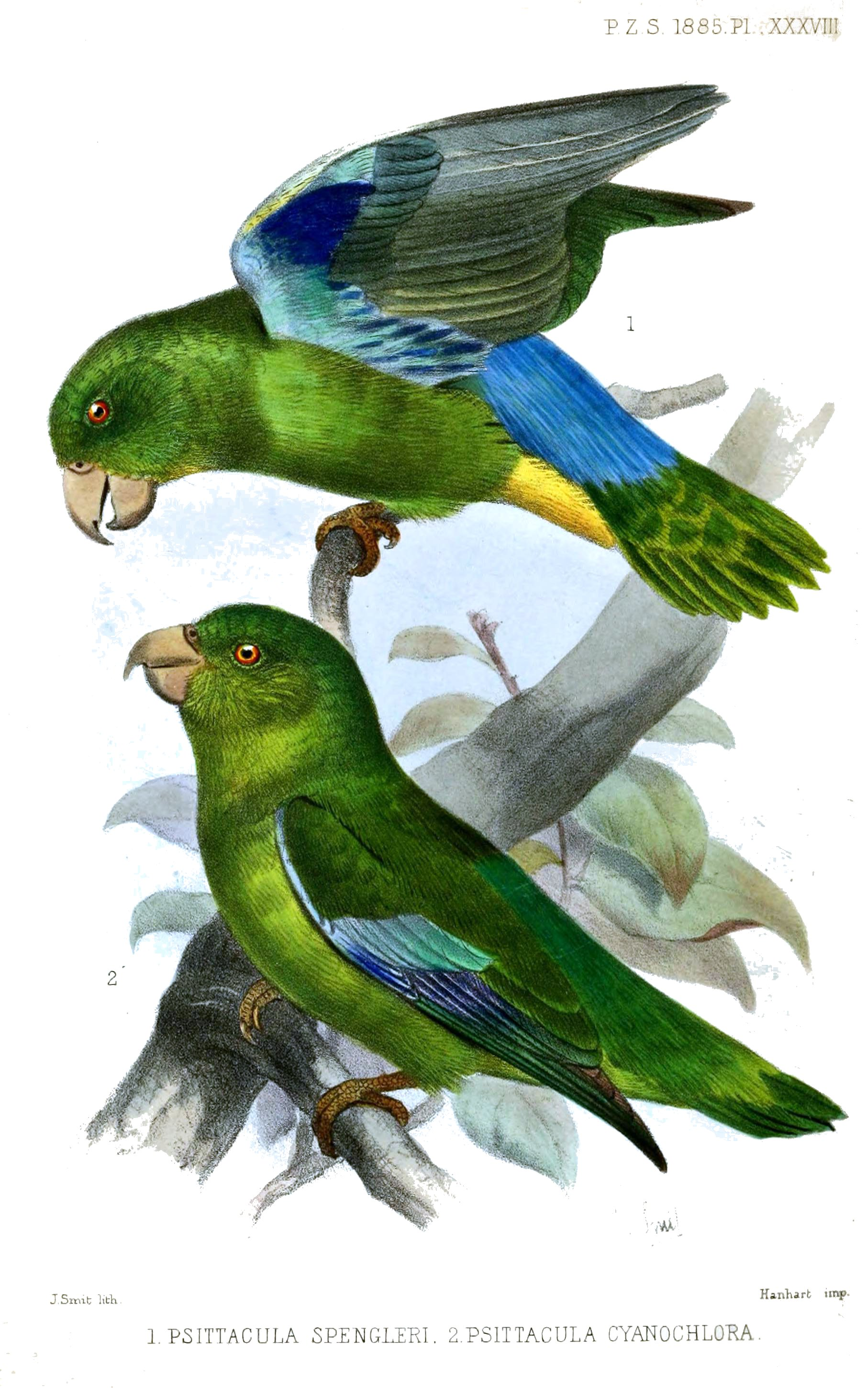
- Illustration of a turquoise-winged parrotlet (Forpus spengeli) (top) and green-rumped parrotlet (Forpus passerinus) (bottom)

Conservation status
- Least Concern (IUCN 3.1)

Scientific classification
- Kingdom: Animalia
- Phylum: Chordata
- Class: Aves
- Order: Psittaciformes
- Family: Psittacidae
- Genus: Forpus
- Species: F. spengeli

Binomial name
- Forpus spengeli (Hartlaub, 1885)

Synonyms
- Forpus xanthopterygius spengeli

= Turquoise-winged parrotlet =

Species of bird

The turquoise-winged parrotlet (Forpus spengeli) is a species of parrot in the family Psittacidae.

== Description ==
Turquoise-winged parrotlets are typically 12 centimetres (4.7 in) long and weigh about 28 grams (0.99 oz). Their bodies are mostly yellow-green; eyes are dark brown and legs and beak are light peach. Turquoise-winged parrotlets are sexually dimorphic: males have bright turquoise feathers on their lower backs and rumps, and have purple-blue underwing coverts and axillaries. Females have no blue markings, but their foreheads and faces are brighter yellow-green than males'. Like all parrots, turquoise-winged parrotlets exhibit zygodactyly: two toes face forward and two toes face backward.

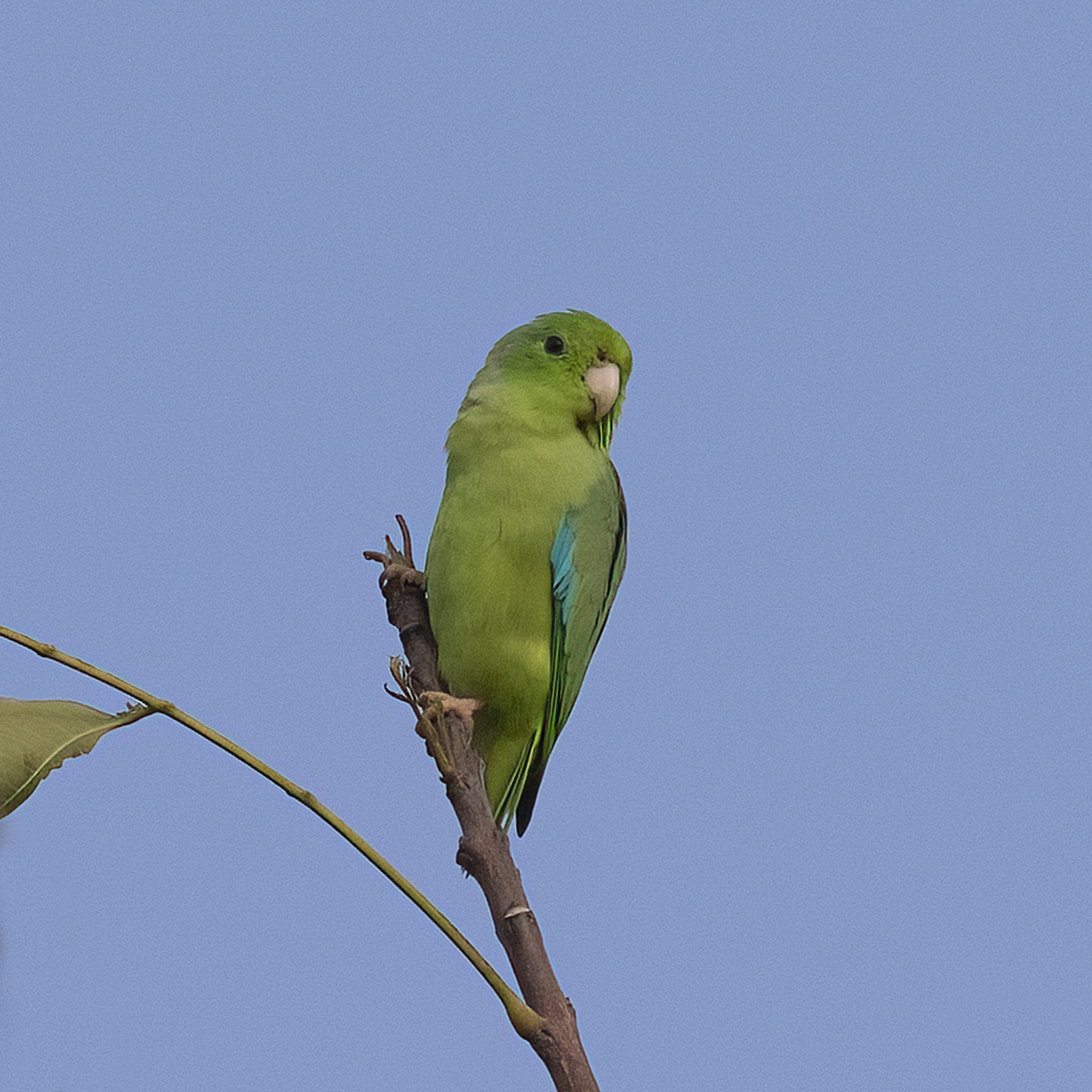
On branch

== Distribution and habitat ==
Turquoise-winged parrotlets are found in northern Colombia from the Caribbean coastal region southwest of the Santa Marta Mountains, Atlantico, and south along the Rio Magdalena in Bolívar and Cesar.

Turquoise-winged parrotlets are most often found in drier, open or riparian woodlands, cerrado, caatinga, savanna, palm groves, semi-arid scrubland, and pastures.

== Conservation ==
There is not an estimate for the number of turquoise-winged parrotlets, but it is believed that their population is decreasing because of increased human interference and habitat destruction. Turquoise-winged parrotlets are listed as Least Concern by the IUCN Red List.

== Behavior and ecology ==
=== Social ===
Turquoise-winged parrotlets are highly gregarious and are often found in flocks of up to 50 birds.

=== Reproduction ===
The turquoise-winged parrotlet's breeding season is May to August. Females lay 3-7 small white eggs.

=== Diet ===
Turquoise-winged parrotlets mostly feed on Cecropia sp. fruits, Mikania sp. and Trema micrantha seeds, and Ambrosia sp. and Marcgravia sp. flowers. They are also known to occasionally feed on other plants such as grass.

== Taxonomy ==
Until recently, the turquoise-winged parrotlet was considered a subspecies of the cobalt-rumped parrotlet as Forpus xanthopterygius spengeli. However, in 2015 Bocalini and Silveira studied morphological differences between subspecies of cobalt-rumped parrotlets and determined that the turquoise-winged parrotlet was its own species, F. spengeli. This split was supported by Donegan et al. in 2016. There is continuing debate over the validity of this change. Some taxonomic authorities (including the American Ornithological Society) do not recognize this change in classification.
