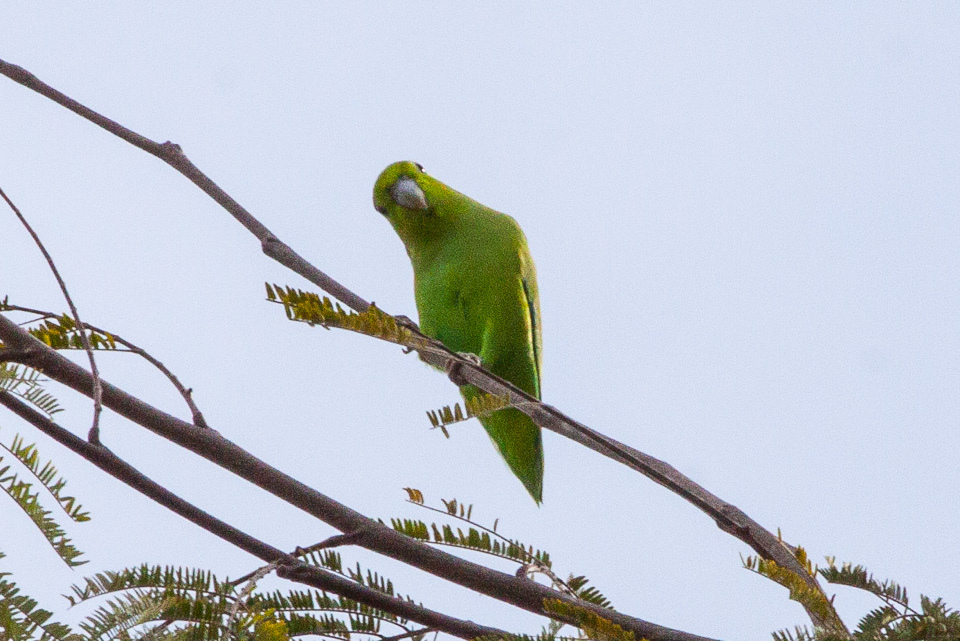

Conservation status
- Near Threatened (IUCN 3.1)

Scientific classification
- Kingdom: Animalia
- Phylum: Chordata
- Class: Aves
- Order: Psittaciformes
- Family: Psittacidae
- Genus: Forpus
- Species: F. cyanopygius

Binomial name
- Forpus cyanopygius (Souancé, 1856)

Subspecies
- F. c. cyanopygius; F. c. insularis

= Mexican parrotlet =

Species of bird

The Mexican parrotlet (Forpus cyanopygius), also known as the turquoise-rumped parrotlet or the Mexican blue-rumped parrotlet, is a species of parrot in the family Psittacidae.

There are two subspecies: Grayson's parrotlet or the Tres Marias parrotlet (F. c. insularis) and F. c. cyanopygius.

== Description ==
Name	Appearance	Range
Mexican parrotlet (Forpus cyanopygius cyanopygius) (nominate subspecies)	Typically 13–14 centimetres (5.1–5.5 in) long and weigh 30–37 grams (1.1–1.3 oz). Bright yellow-green bodies. Light peach beaks and feet and dark brown eyes. Mexican parrotlets exhibit sexual dimorphism: males have light turquoise feathers along the leading edges of their wings and on their rumps and primaries, secondaries, and coverts; females are entirely yellow-green and slightly duller. Some male individuals have faint turquoise feathers behind their eyes and around their heads. Like all parrots, Mexican parrotlets exhibit zygodactyly, meaning two toes face forward and two face backward. Juveniles look like adults, though young males have green feathers mixed in with their blue ones.	Sinaloa and western Durango to Colima
Grayson's parrotlet or Tres Marias parrotlet (F. c. insularis)	Compared to the nominate species, males have darker green upperparts and bluer underparts. Their turquoise markings are darker. Females are darker green. Individuals are usually slightly larger than those of the nominate species.	Tres Marias islands

== Distribution and habitat ==
Mexican parrotlets are endemic to western Mexico. Their range extends from southern Sonora to Colima. This species is the northernmost member of the genus Forpus. Though they are non-migratory, they wander throughout their range to follow the blooming and growth patterns of the plants they prefer to feed on.

Natural habitats are subtropical or tropical dry scrublands, deciduous forests, open grasslands with scattered trees, heavily degraded former forest, plantations, and woodlands along watercourses. They are not found at altitudes higher than 1,300 metres (4,300 ft) above sea level.

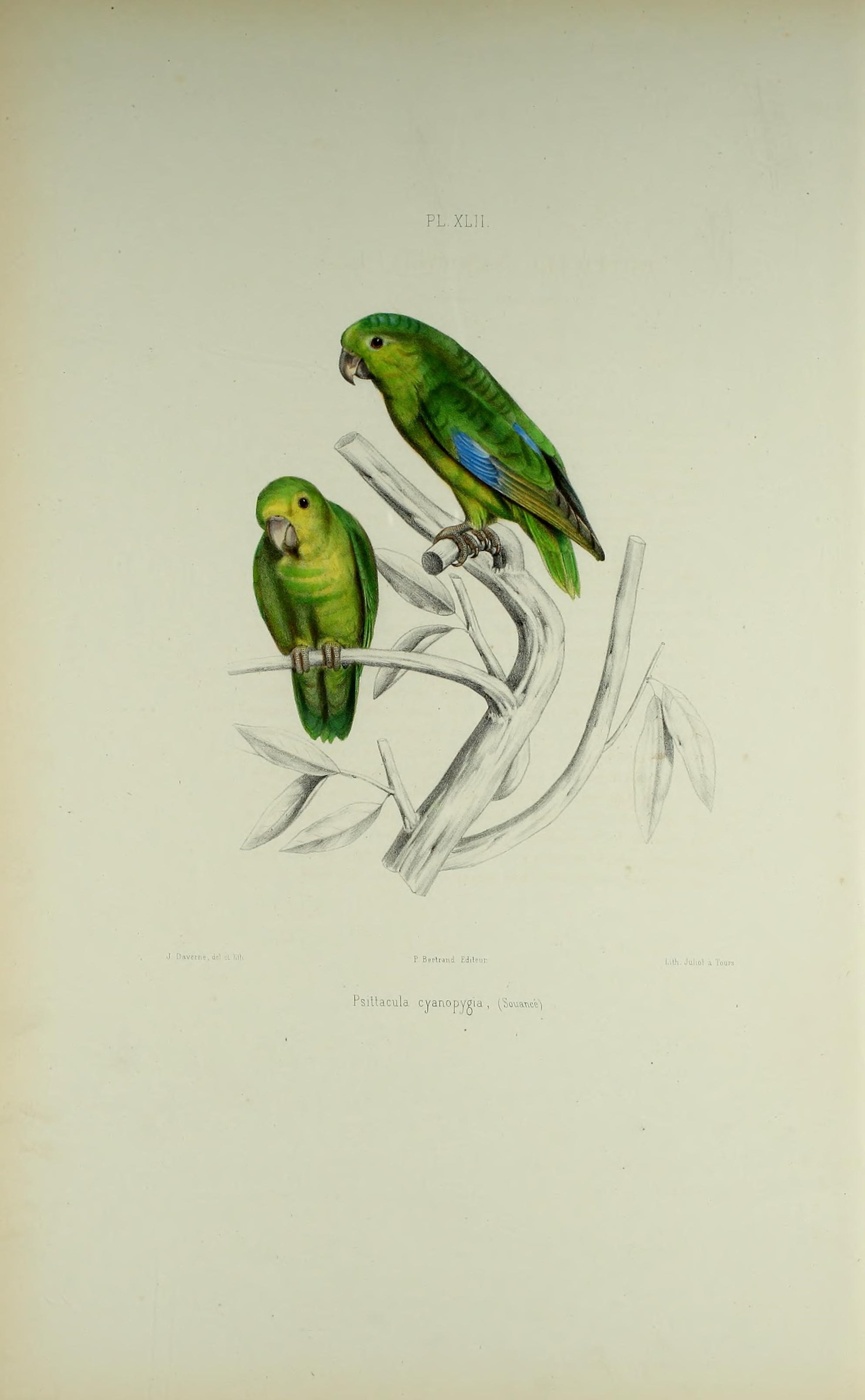
Illustration of a male and female Mexican parrotlet

== Conservation ==
According to the IUCN Red List, Mexican parrotlets are Near Threatened. The population is estimated to be 50,000 or greater, but it is decreasing due to a combination of the illegal hunting and trapping of wild individuals and habitat loss. Based on records created before 1995, there were approximately 208,000 individuals in Mexico. According to records from 1996 to 2013, around 107,000 remain, which represents a 48.4% drop in population.

=== Threats ===
It is estimated that up to 8,000 individuals are illegally captured for the pet trade every year. There are no current conservation measures in place, but many areas across the Mexican parrotlet's range are already protected.

== Behavior ==
=== Social ===
Mexican parrotlets are highly social and gregarious birds, most often found in flocks of 4–30 individuals made up of pairs and family groups. When flying in these flocks, they fly quickly and in relatively tight formations. They create a variety of squeaky, excited-sounding chirps while perched or in flight. While feeding, they make occasional squawks.

=== Reproduction ===
Mexican parrotlets typically breed between May and July, and lay clutches of up to 3 small, white eggs. They are typically incubated for at least 19 days, and chicks fledge 4–5 weeks after hatching. Mexican parrotlets can live to be over 20 years old. Mexican parrotlets usually nest in tree cavities, cacti, and other similar structures.

=== Diet ===
Mexican parrotlets most commonly eat seeds, grass seeds, berries, and Ficus (fig) fruits, which may be ripe or half-ripe. They forage both on the ground and in trees and shrubs as large flocks. They are known to wander frequently in search of food, making regional population estimates difficult.

== Aviculture ==
Mexican parrotlets are uncommon, though not unheard of, in aviculture. Because of their protections, they cannot legally be captured from the wild and sold as pets, so the captive population relies on breeding programs.
