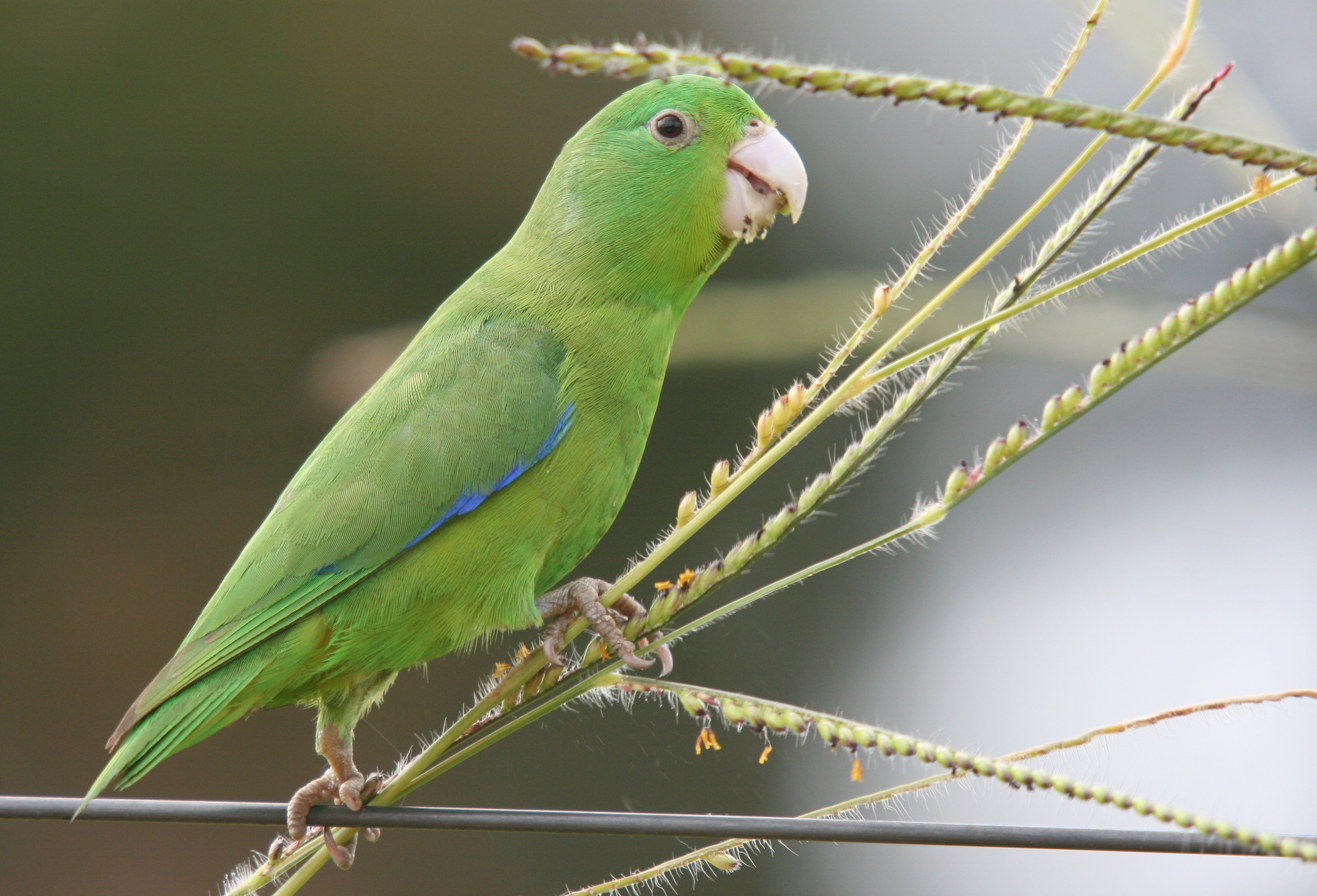
- Male in Goias, Brazil

Conservation status
- Least Concern (IUCN 3.1)

Scientific classification
- Kingdom: Animalia
- Phylum: Chordata
- Class: Aves
- Order: Psittaciformes
- Family: Psittacidae
- Genus: Forpus
- Species: F. xanthopterygius

Binomial name
- Forpus xanthopterygius (Spix, 1824)

Subspecies
- F. x. xanthopterygius; F. x. flavescens; F. x. flavissimus

= Cobalt-rumped parrotlet =

Species of bird

The cobalt-rumped parrotlet (Forpus xanthopterygius) or blue-winged parrotlet is a species of parrot in the family Psittacidae.

There are two subspecies: Salvadori's cobalt-rumped parrotlet (F. x. flavescens) and Hellmayr's cobalt-rumped parrotlet (F. x. flavissimus).

== Description ==
Name	Appearance	Range
cobalt-rumped parrotlet (Forpus xanthopterygius xanthopterygius) (nominate subspecies)	Typically around 12 centimetres (4.7 in) long and weigh about 28 grams (0.99 oz). Primarily green or olive green with light peach beaks and feet and dark brown eyes, which are surrounded by bright green. Cobalt-rumped parrotlets are sexually dimorphic: males have purple-blue primary, secondary, and underwing coverts with bright blue patch on rump. Females have no blue markings and yellow-green foreheads. Like all parrots, Cobalt-rumped parrotlets exhibit zygodactyly, meaning two toes face forward and two face backward. Juveniles look like adults, except males have green feathers mixed in with their blue markings.	northeastern Argentina (Misiones, northeastern Corrientes, eastern Chaco, eastern Formosa), from Paraguay north through central/mideastern Brazil to northern Bahia
Salvadori's cobalt-rumped parrotlet (F. x. flavescens)	Compared to the nominate species, both males and females are more yellow-green or paler in color. Males have paler blue markings on wings and more yellow-green foreheads, cheeks, and underparts.	mideastern Peru south to eastern Bolivia (Beni, Santa Cruz)
Hellmayr's cobalt-rumped parrotlet (F. x. flavissimus)	Both males and females are more yellow-green or paler in color. Males have more yellow-green foreheads, cheeks, and throats.	northeastern Brazil from Maranhão, Ceará, Paraiba south to northern Bahia

== Distribution and habitat ==
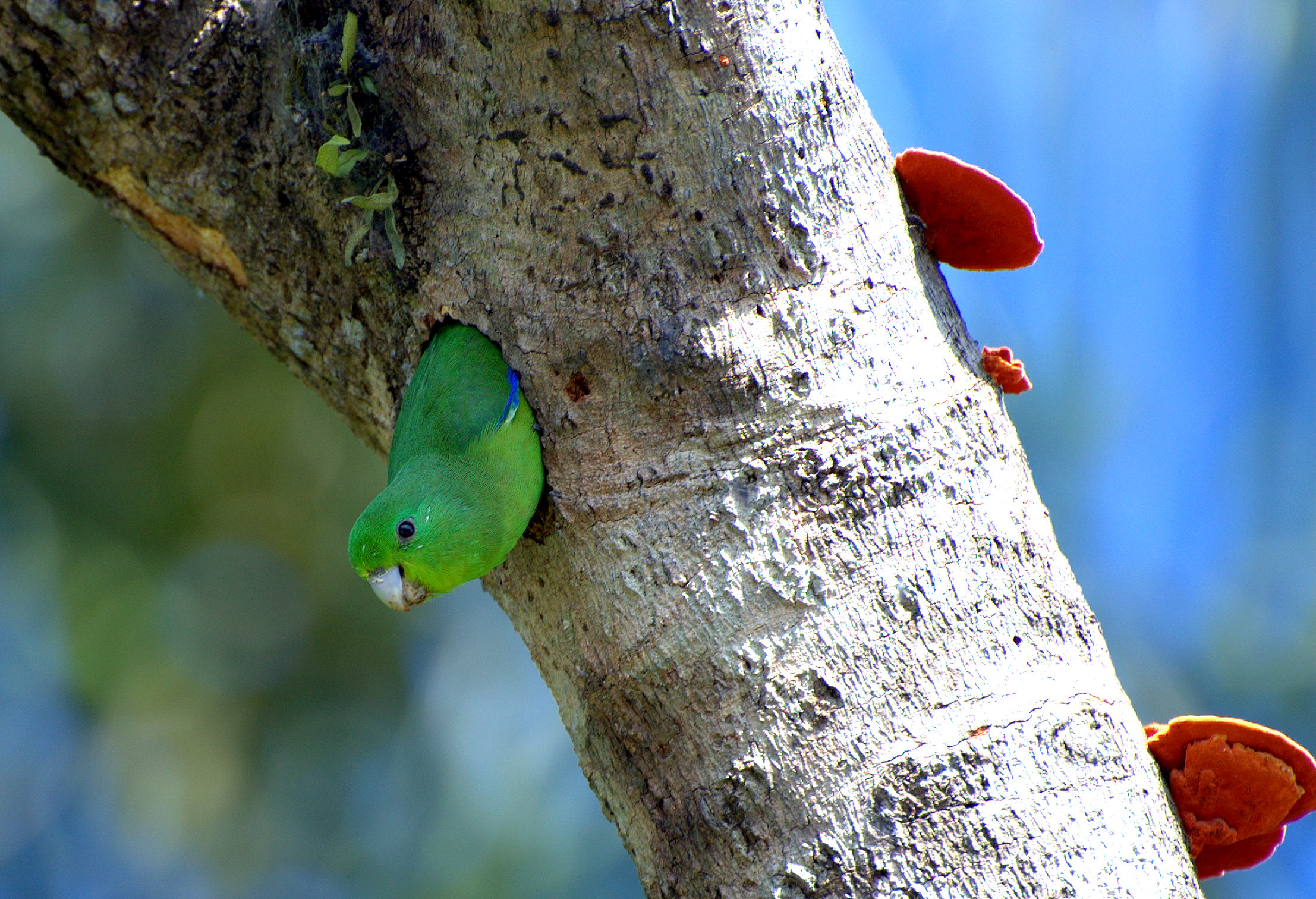
A male cobalt-rumped parrotlet looking out from a nest in the Vale do Ribeira, Brazil

Cobalt-rumped parrotlets are found in much of central and northern South America. Their range is split by each subspecies, as described above. It is generally common and widespread, though more localized in the Amazon Basin.

Cobalt-rumped parrotlets are mainly found in lowlands. They occur in dry and riparian woodlands, cerrado, caatinga, palm groves, semi-arid scrubland, savanna, and pastures. Cobalt-rumped parrotlets tend to avoid densely forested areas. They are not found at altitudes above 1,200 metres (3,900 ft).

Cobalt-rumped parrotlets are generally non-migratory; however, populations in Argentina move locally according to the flowering seasons of various plant species in their diet. Populations in the Brazilian Atlantic Forest are altitudinal migrants.

== Conservation ==
The number of cobalt-rumped parrotlets is unknown, but the population is stable. It is listed as Least Concern by the IUCN Red List. The number of wild individuals is unknown.

=== Threats ===
The cobalt-rumped parrotlet is not known to be affected by deforestation or the pet trade, unlike many of its close relatives in the genus Forpus. There are many areas across its range that are already protected.

== Behavior and ecology ==
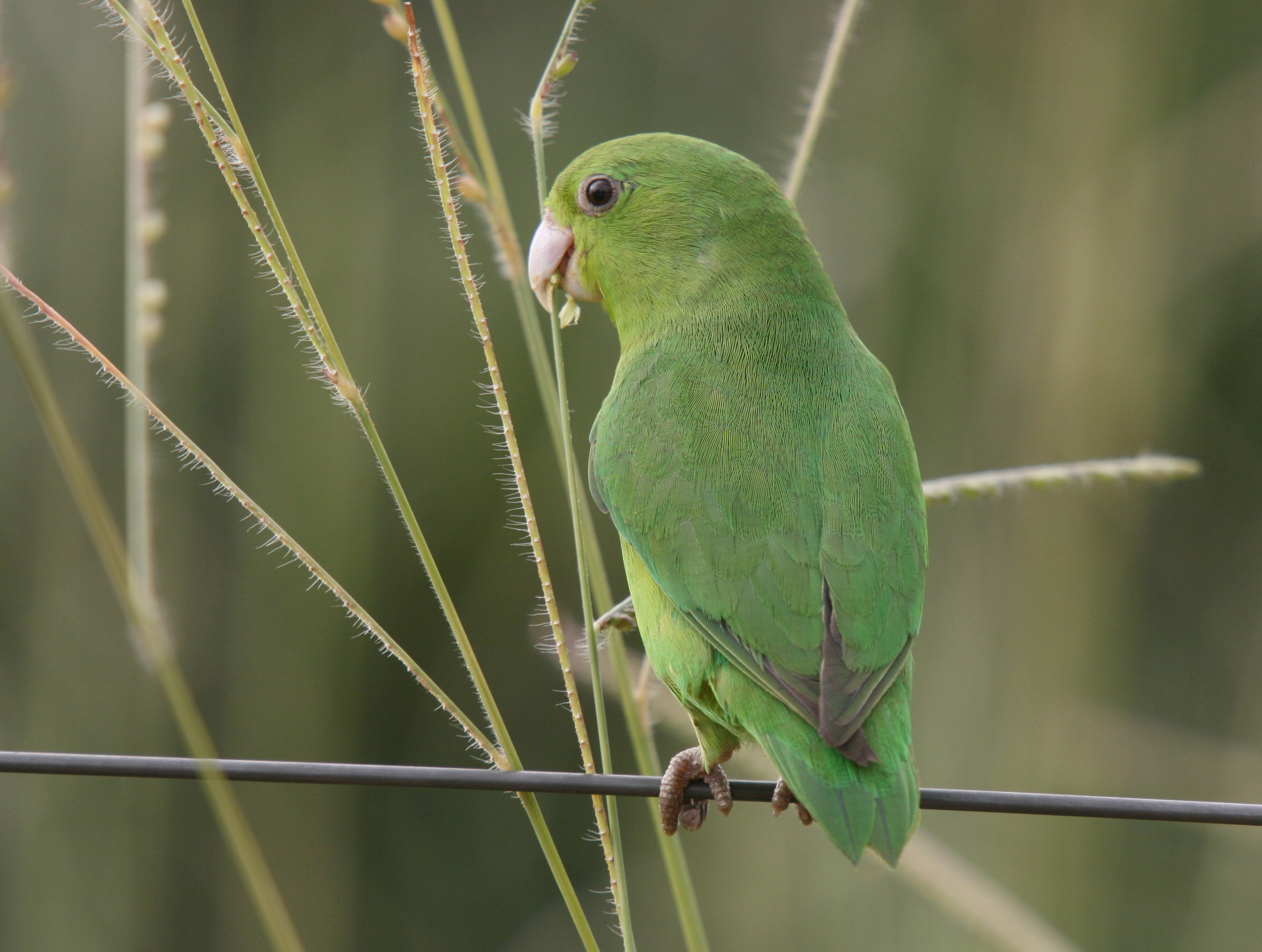
A female cobalt-rumped parrotlet in Goiás, Brazil

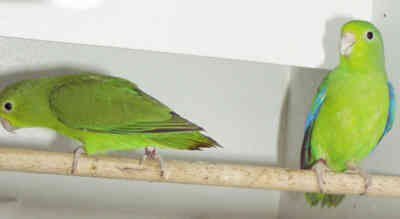
Pair of cobalt-rumped parrotlets kept as pets

=== Social ===
Flocks are usually around 20 birds but can grow to over 50 around fruiting trees or seeding grasses. They are highly social and gregarious. Cobalt-rumped parrotlets tend to feed in groups, usually between 2 and 12 individuals.

Cobalt-rumped parrotlets call while in flight and perched. Their calls are high-pitched "sheet" or "zeet" screeches or twittering. When feeding and socializing in large groups they make twittering and chattering noises.

=== Reproduction ===
Cobalt-rumped parrotlets' breeding season is May to August, but occupied nests have been observed in July, January, and March in different areas of the birds' range. Females lay 3-7 small, white, roughly spherical eggs. Some cobalt-rumped parrotlets have been observed to scrape rufous hornero nests (made of clay) with their beaks. Though the reason for this is not entirely clear, nests created by rufous horneros have been used by cobalt-rumped parrotlets to raise their broods, which has led to the suggestion that the parrotlets are "taste-testing" the nest material to determine whether it is suitable, according to unknown standards, for their needs. However, similar studies of other Forpus species have concluded that clay-licking provides important minerals to the birds that otherwise would not be accessible.

=== Diet ===
Cobalt-rumped parrotlets mostly feed on Cecropia sp. and Ficus sp. fruits, Mikania sp. and Trema micrantha seeds, and Ambrosia sp., Handroanthus serratifolius, and Marcgravia sp. flowers. However, they are known to occasionally feed on other plants such as grass. Cobalt-rumped parrotlets have been known to migrate locally based on the flowering and fruiting seasons of some of the main plants of their diet.

== Taxonomy ==
For many years, the cobalt-rumped parrotlet was considered conspecific with the green-rumped parrotlet (Forpus passerinus), but today all authorities recognize the two as separate species. The turquoise-winged parrotlet (F. spengeli) and the riparian parrotlet (F. crassirostris) were also considered conspecific with the cobalt-rumped parrotlet until studies in 2015 pointed out the error in this classification based on morphological and geographical differences. However, some taxonomic authorities, including the American Ornithological Society, still consider them so.

The cobalt-rumped parrotlet, at least until 2021, is a rare case in which the common name has been more stable than the binomial. F. xanthopterygius initially referred to what are now considered two distinct species: the cobalt-rumped parrotlet (then referred to as the blue-winged parrotlet) and the white-winged parakeet (Brotogeris versicolurus). In 1945, the Brazilian ornithologist Olivério Pinto discarded the name F. xanthopterygius for the blue-winged parrotlet and renamed it F. crassirostris (which now applies to the closely related riparian parrotlet). During the same year, the blue-winged parrotlet was mistakenly recorded as F. xanthopterygius crassirostris and was again reverted to F. xanthopterygius. In 1978, Pinto mentioned the mistake in Novo Catálogo das Aves do Brazil and the name was changed to F. crassirostris. However, as was pointed out in 1999, the original name (F. xanthopterygius) remains valid per ICZN rules. Consequently, this name was re-applied to the blue-winged parrotlet. In 2021, the species was renamed from blue-winged parrotlet to cobalt-rumped parrotlet by the IOC, marking the first major change to the common name of the species. Additionally, the name of the nominate subspecies also changed: F. x. xanthopterygius is the subspecies formerly listed as F. crassirostris vividus.
