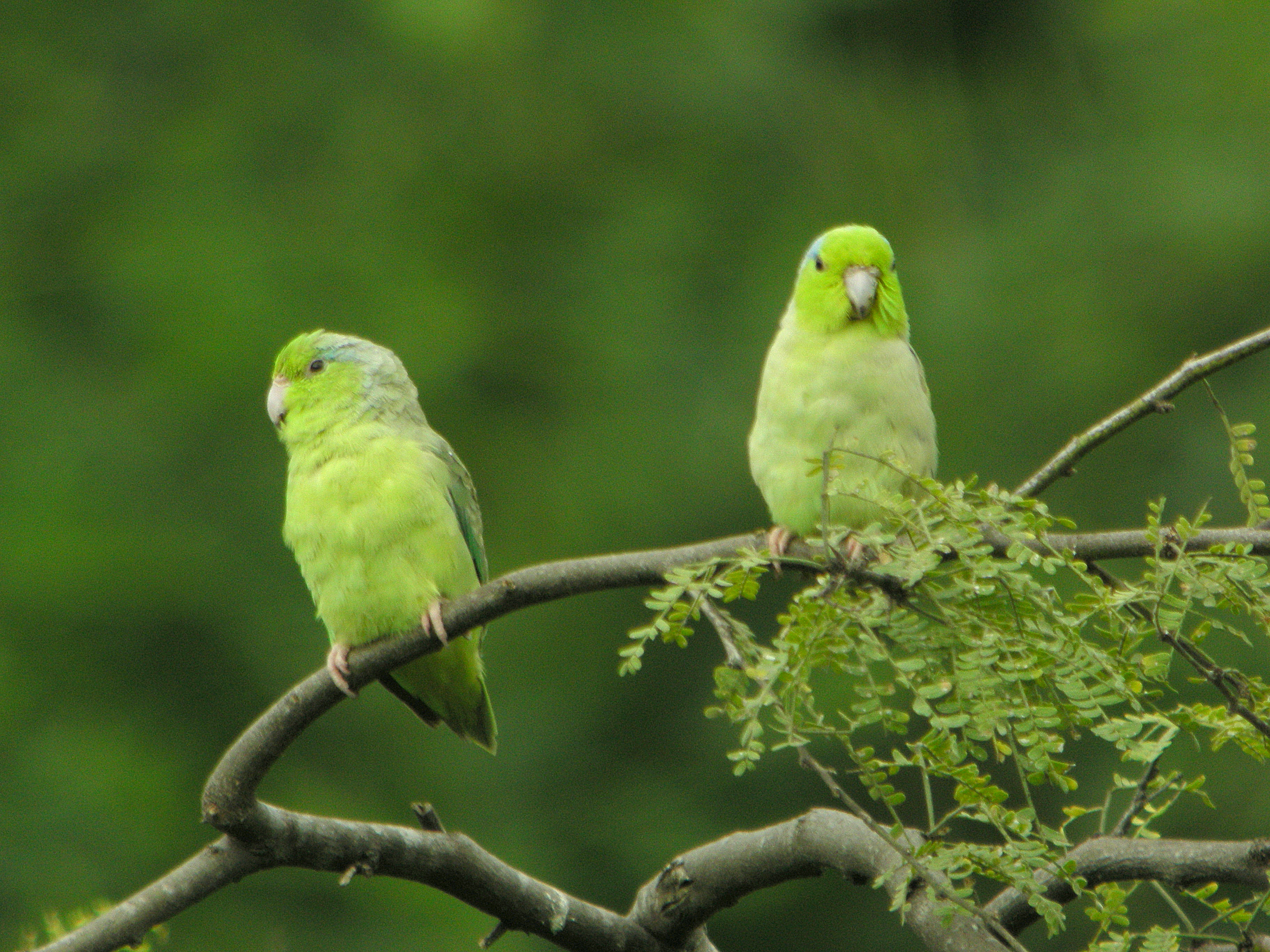
- in Ecuador

Conservation status
- Least Concern (IUCN 3.1)

Scientific classification
- Kingdom: Animalia
- Phylum: Chordata
- Class: Aves
- Order: Psittaciformes
- Family: Psittacidae
- Genus: Forpus
- Species: F. coelestis

Binomial name
- Forpus coelestis (Lesson, 1847)

= Pacific parrotlet =

Species of bird

The Pacific parrotlet (Forpus coelestis), also known as Lesson's parrotlet, or the celestial parrotlet, is a species of small parrot in the family Psittacidae.

== Description ==
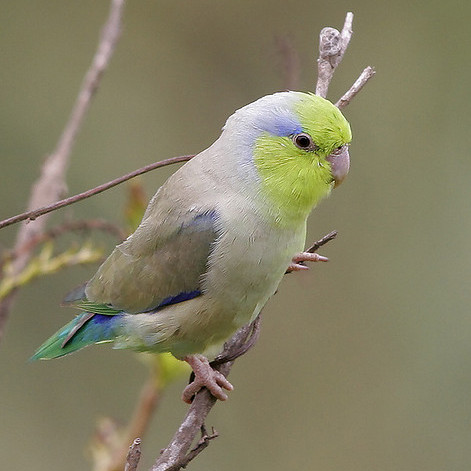
Wild male in Peru

The Pacific parrotlet (Forpus coelestis) is a small green parrot originating in South America. A typical specimen is 11–14 centimetres (4.3–5.5 in) long and typically weighs 30 grams or more. Wild Pacific parrotlets are green with a dusty grey cast over the body, a bright green mask and a pinkish beak. Legs and feet are pinkish-grey. Pacific parrotlets are sexually dimorphic: males possess shades of blue on their wings. Blue can vary in intensity from a bright cobalt blue to a pale, almost lavender shade of blue on American birds; the blue is almost non-existent on marbled birds, only being visible on the underside of the wing right on the joint. Male parrotlets also have blue streaks behind the eyes which is often referred to as "eyeshadow;" as well as blue rumps. Female parrotlets have no blue on the wings whatsoever but can have blue eye streaks as well as a blue rump.

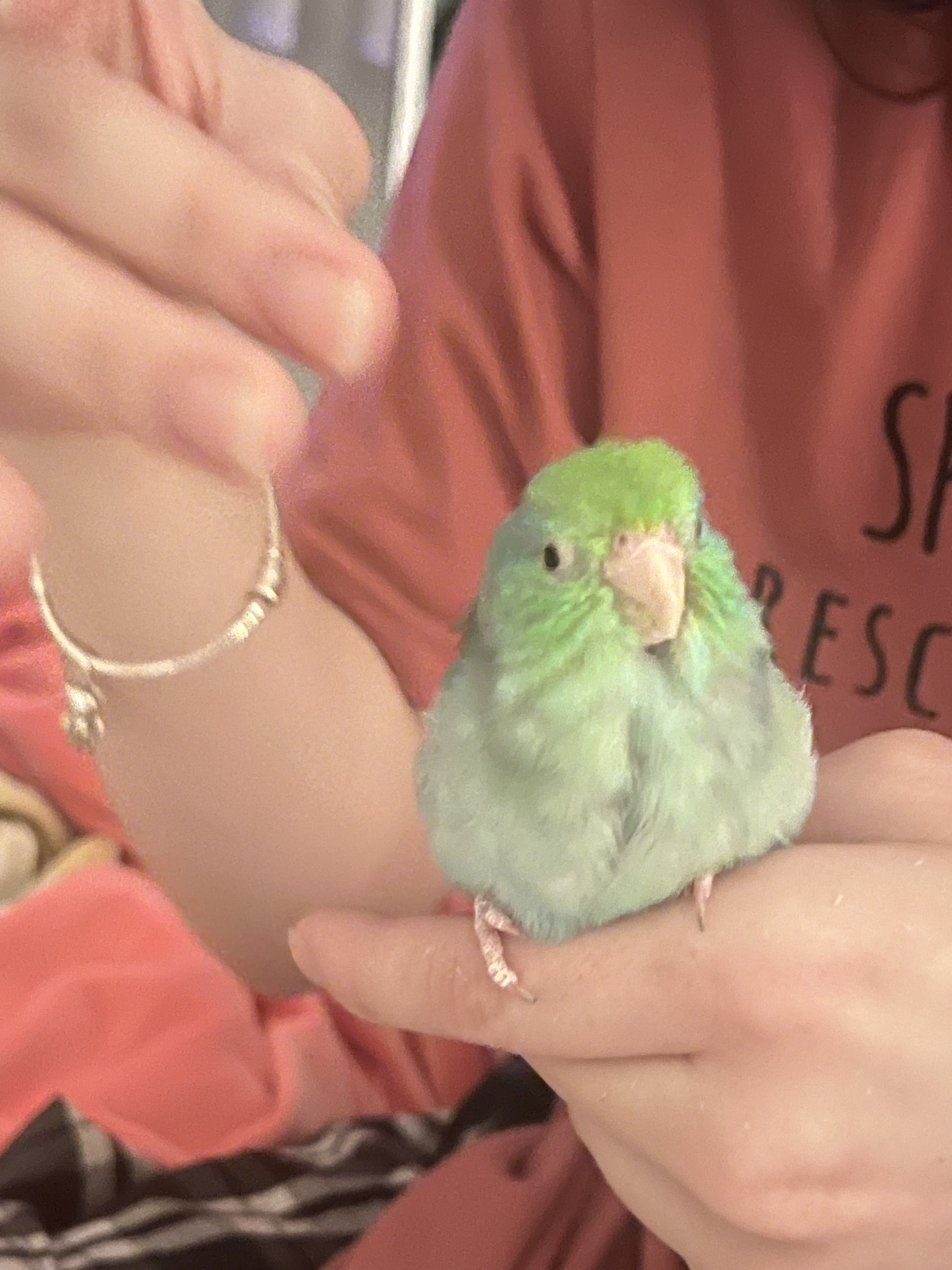
Echo Smithour, turquoise pacific parrotlet. 2024

Parrotlets are often referred to as pocket parrots because of their size; but they are known for their larger-than-life personalities and feisty attitudes. They are solitary birds in captivity due to their aggressive behavior towards other birds when confined, so it is not suggested to house one with conspecifics unless ample space is available. Pet parrotlets should never be kept with other bird species due to the likelihood of aggression.

Although the base, or wild-type color of parrotlets is green, they also come in a rainbow of mutations: American Yellow, Green Marbled, American Yellow Marbled, Green Fallow, Green Fallow Marbled, American Yellow Fallow, American Yellow Marbled Fallow, Blue, American White, Blue Marbled, American White Marbled, Blue Fallow, American White Fallow, Blue Marbled Fallow, American White Marbled Fallow, Turquoise, American Turquoise, Turquoise Marbled, American Turquoise Marbled, Turquoise Fallow, American Turquoise Fallow, Turquoise Fallow Marbled, American Turquoise Fallow Marbled, Grey, American Grey, Grey Marbled, American Grey Marbled, Grey Fallow, American Grey Fallow, Grey Fallow Marbled, American Grey Fallow Marbled, Albino, Lutino Creamino, Cinnamon, Misty, Dark Factor, and Pied. "Dilute" is a term not used in parrotlets. "Pastel" was previously a term used for edging on the feathers and wings; however, the preferred term is Marbled.

== Distribution and habitat ==
Wild Pacific parrotlets are native to western Ecuador and northwestern Peru. Most common in dry habitats such as the desert and deciduous forest, but have spread into humid areas in response to deforestation. Pacific parrotlets have also been reported in the middle Marañón valley. In 2014 a small flock of Pacific parrotlets was reported near the Rio Mataje in Nariño, southwestern Colombia.

They are abundant across their range; populations are relatively undisturbed by human activity. Pacific parrotlets are found living in flocks from 40 to 50, on the borders of W lowlands and foothills, woodlands, shrubby clearings, gardens, parks, and crops (Restall & Freile, 2019, p. 208). Pacific parrotlets typically live in subtropical or tropical dry forest, subtropical or tropical moist lowland forest, subtropical or tropical dry shrubland, and heavily degraded former forest. Pacific parrotlets are non-migratory, meaning they stay in the same area year-round.

== Conservation ==
The Pacific parrotlet is currently listed as Least Concern by the IUCN Red List. The number of mature individuals in the wild is not known, but population size seems to be stable.

== Behavior ==
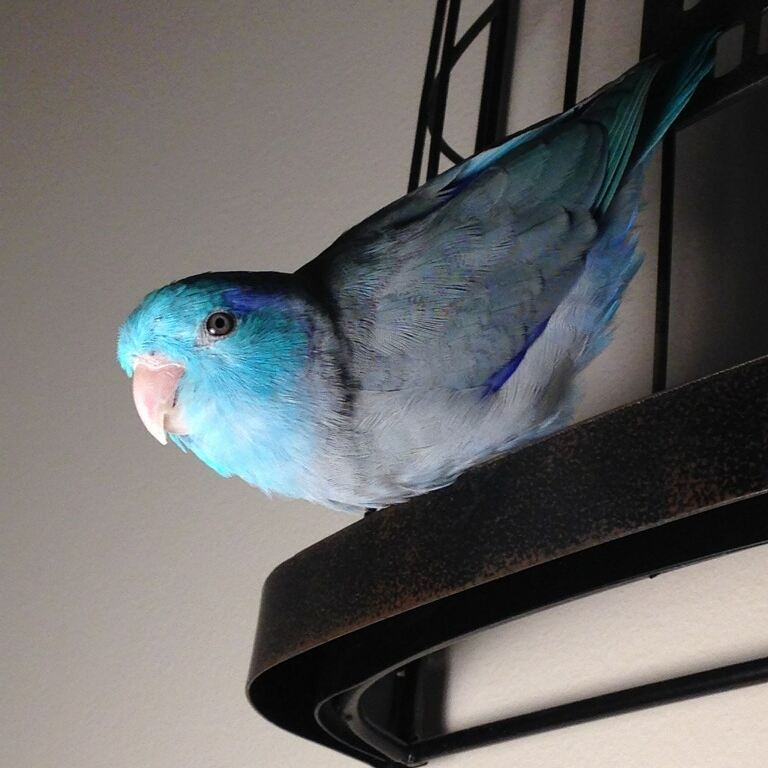
Blue male Pacific parrotlet

=== Social ===
Pacific parrotlets are found living in flocks from 40 to 50. Calls are high-pitched and rapid "tchit"; in flock situations this produces a constant chattering. In captivity they are best kept individually with ample human attention, given their propensity for aggression, but can also be kept as a pair in a very large cage under extreme supervision, as they are very social birds that can benefit from same species companionship, but have violent tendencies under stressful conditions. The cage must be big enough that the weaker bird in the pair can fly away from confrontation when conflict arises. Parrotlets are very easy to emotionally distress and their reactions are dangerous to their health, so keeping them isolated from other parrot species outside of the cage is an absolute must.

When initially introducing two individual birds to become a pair, this must be done gradually over a longer period of time. At first the birds should live in separate cages in the same room, after a while; careful and supervised time together out of the cage, and lastly when a friendship has formed; moving into the large cage for the pair. Preferably none of the birds should have lived in the large cage prior, since this can spark territorial aggression.

=== Reproduction ===
Pacific parrotlets are very protective of their eggs and chicks. Each clutch has 4–6 white eggs, which are incubated for an average of 18 days. In the wild they nest in tree cavities or on fence posts. They have also been observed to nest in abandoned nests of necklaced spinetails and pale-legged horneros.

=== Diet ===
Pacific parrotlets tend to feed on berries and cactus fruits, but are not picky in their feeding. In captivity, parrotlets eat many fruits, seeds, vegetables, and herbs.

While in captivity, Pacific parrotlets thrive on a variety diet, some staples may include but are not limited to offerings of quinoa, millet, broccoli, beetroot, oats, bellpepper, brown rice, apples, and pomegranate seeds. This can also be combined into the form of "chop" and blended and frozen for future use.

Note their arid native environment and choose a pellet-based mix. Be careful to avoid overfeeding seeds, especially those high in fat including sunflower and safflower. Fatty liver disease is common in New World parrots.

Infant parrotlets will feed on a prepared mixture of hatchling hand feeding formula, and must be supervised and assisted when under a month old. Older birds will gradually develop an appetite for a more seed or pellet based diet, which should always be supplemented with fresh fruits and vegetables.

== Aviculture ==
This species is not very common in pet stores and is valued by breeders. Its normal price range is $250 all the way up to US$1200. Since 1930 the U.S. has had an established breeding population in captivity, before CITES laws preventing importing wildlife from foreign countries. In the wild, the average lifespan for Pacific parrotlets is 10.4 years. Captive Pacific parrotlets can exceed this age with good care, proper breeding, and regular veterinary examinations, although individuals may have shorter or longer life spans due to poor breeding practices.

Pacific parrotlets, like many larger parrot species, can learn to "speak", or mimic, though their "voices" are not as clear as larger birds. Their vocabulary is relatively limited compared to larger parrots, although they have been known to learn a few words and phrases.

The species is well known among parrotlet breeders and owners as being feisty and curious despite their small size.

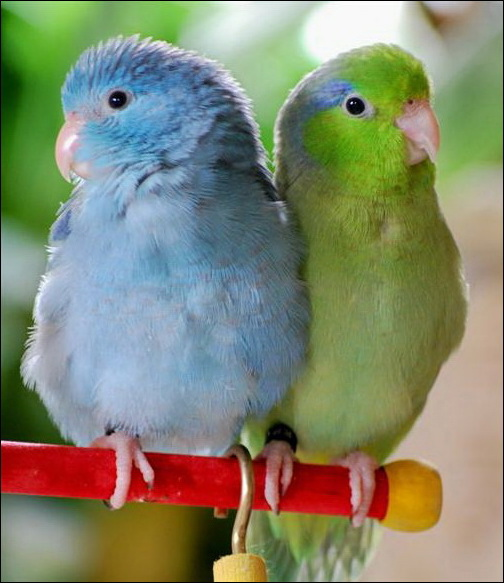
Female blue and male green/wild-type

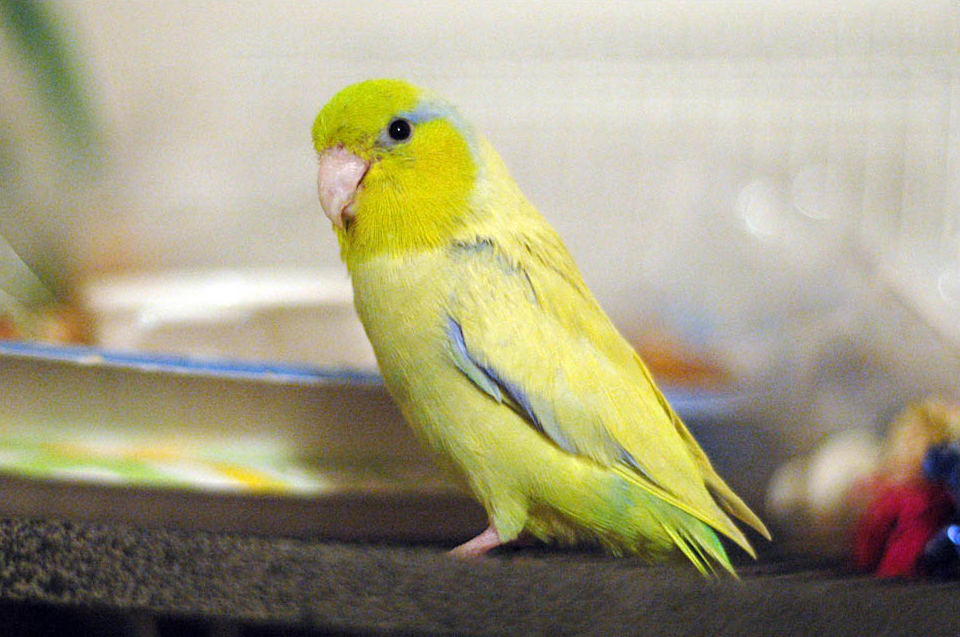
Male yellow mutation

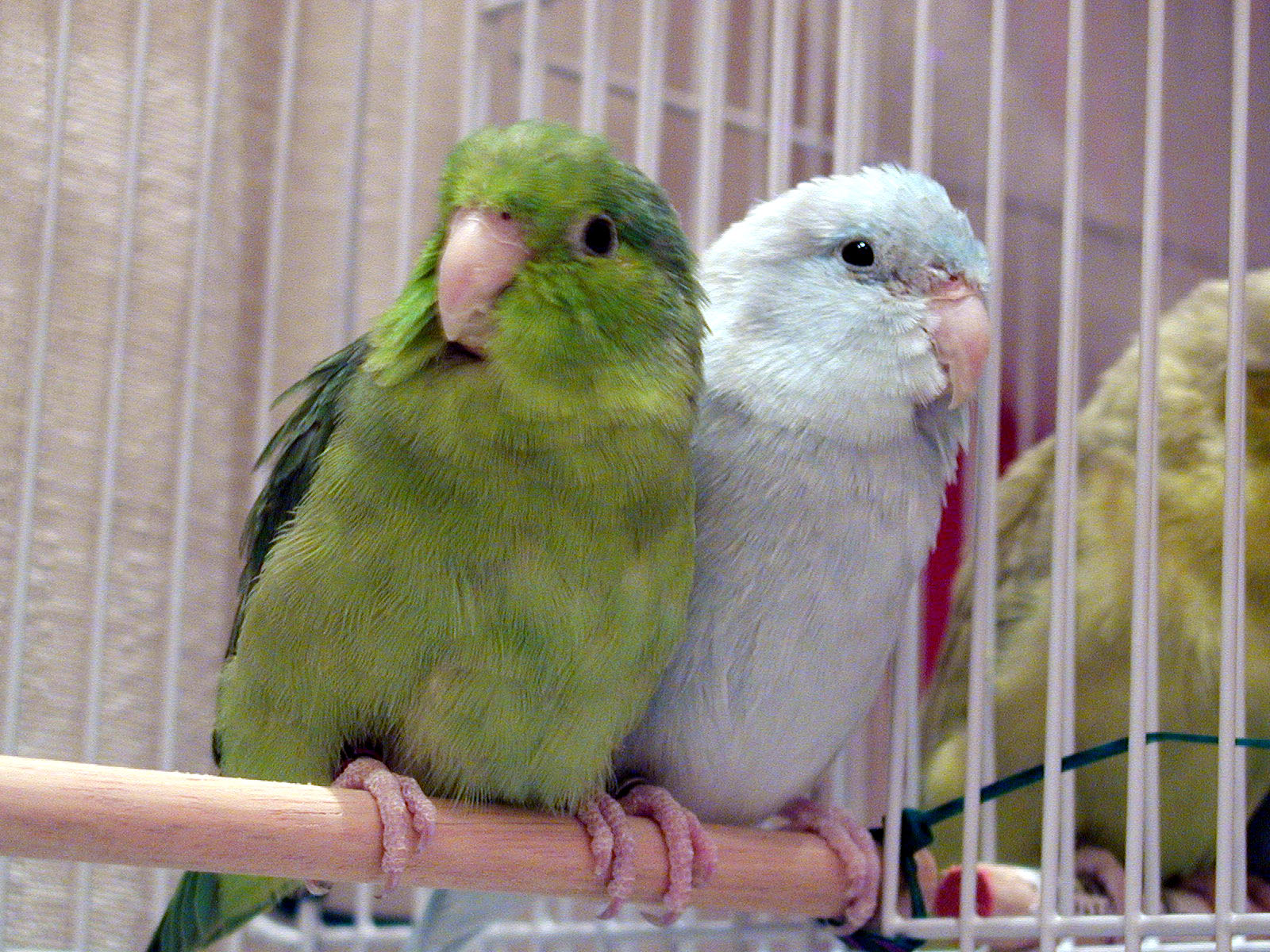
Male wild-type and female American white/dilute blue

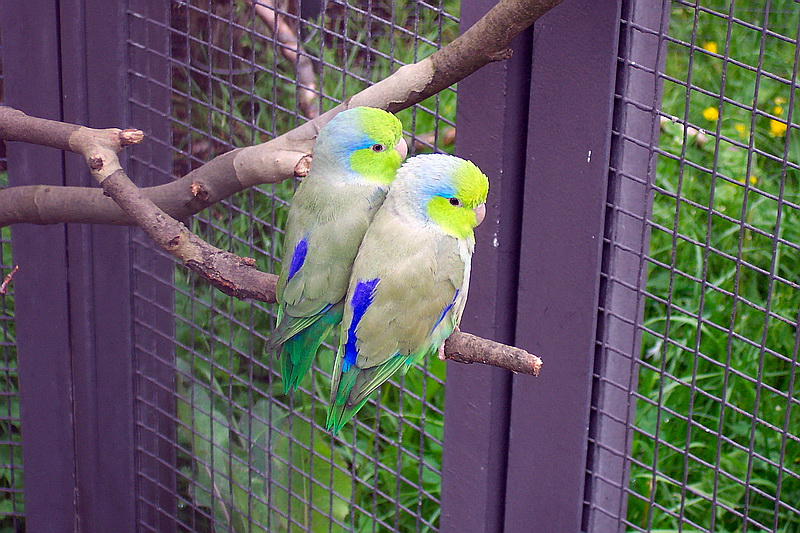
Two male wild-types

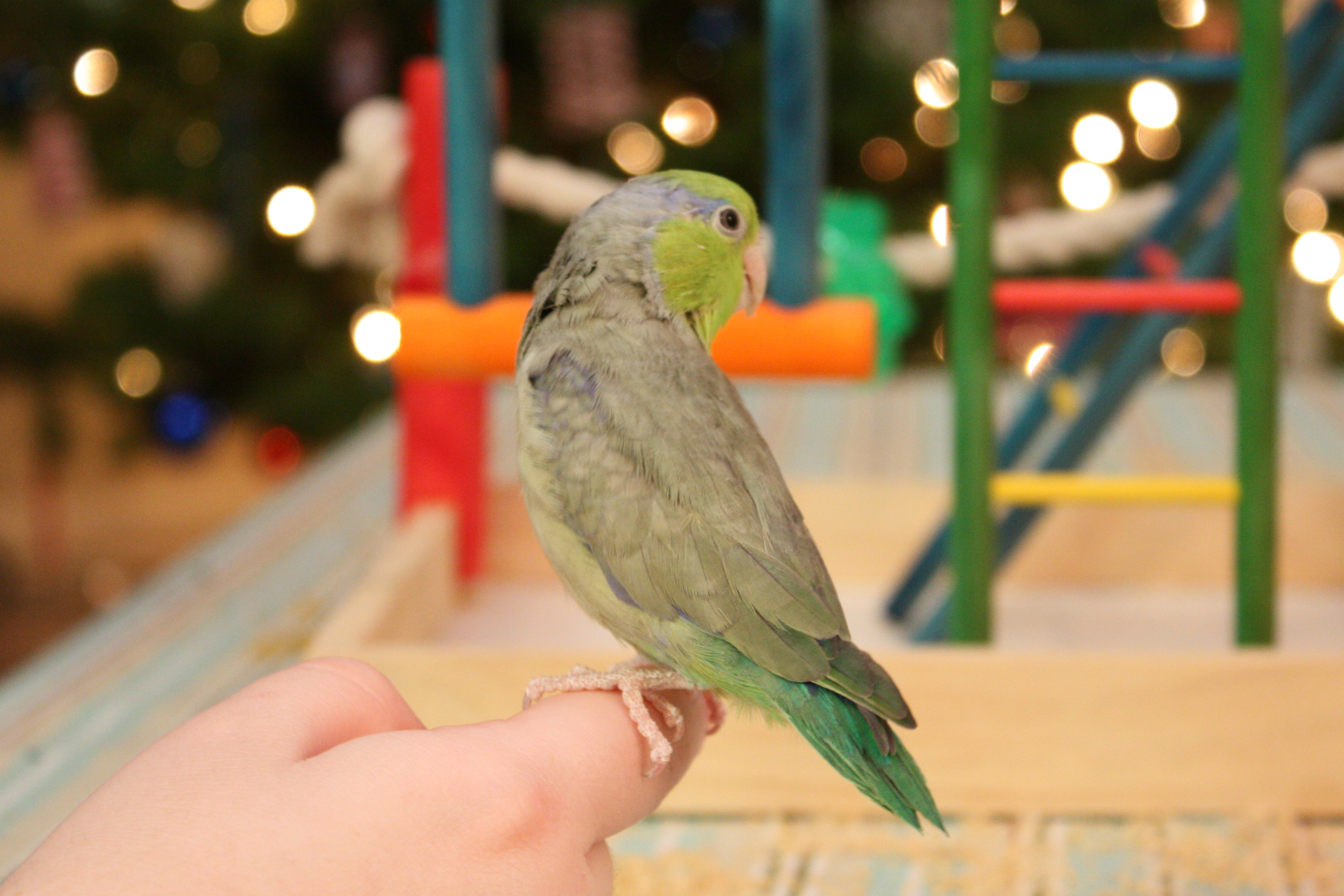
Female wild-type

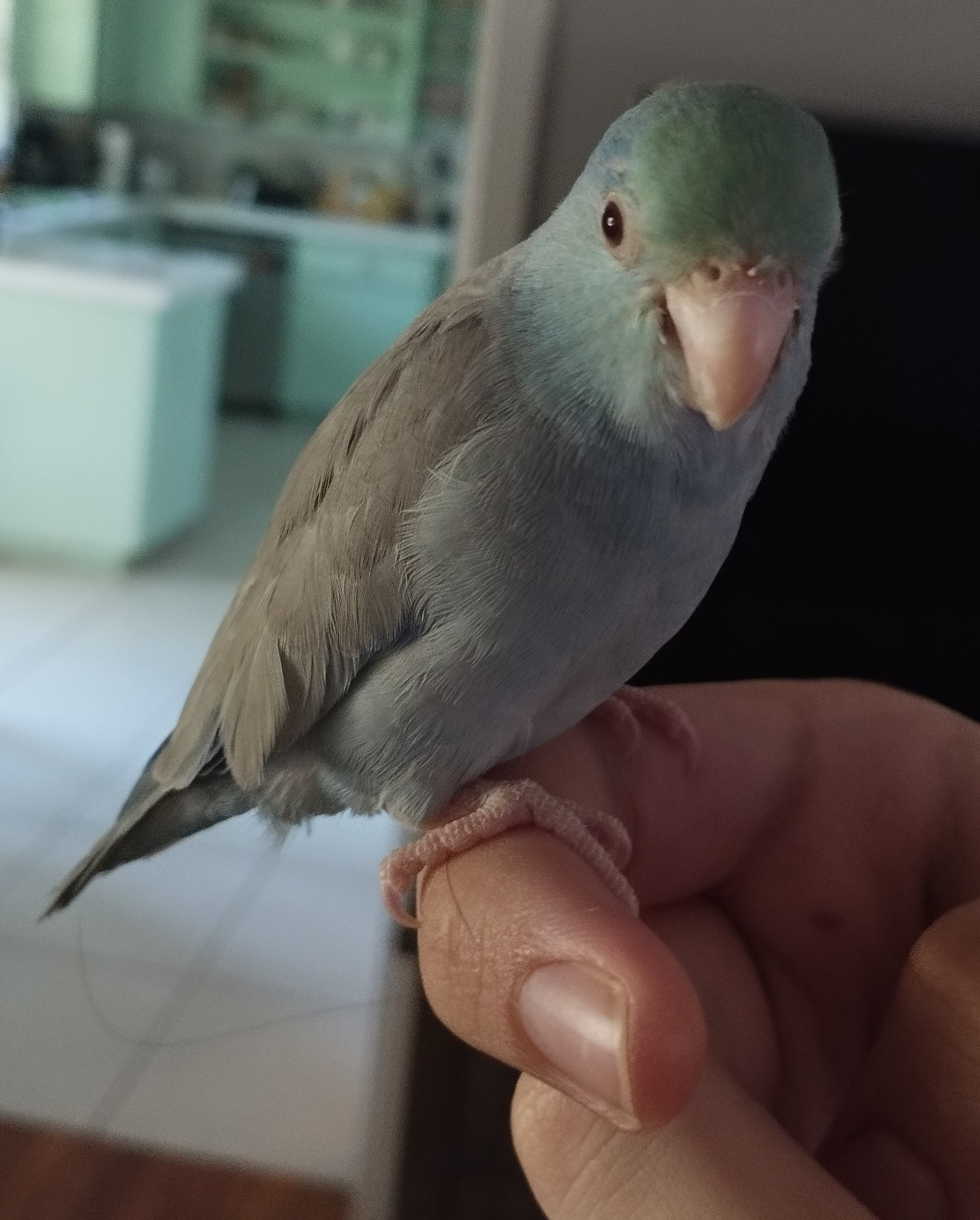
A turquoise parrotlet on a finger for size reference.
