= King parrot =

King parrot may refer to:

== Common name of species ==
- Red-capped parrot (Purpureicephalus spurius), a regional name in Western Australia
- Alisterus
  - Australian king parrot (Alisterus scapularis), found in eastern Australia
  - Papuan king parrot (A. chloropterus) in Papua
  - Moluccan king parrot (A. amboinensis) in Moluccas and other Indonesian islands.

== Other ==
- King Parrot (band), Australian band
- King Parrot Creek, stream in Victoria, Australia
