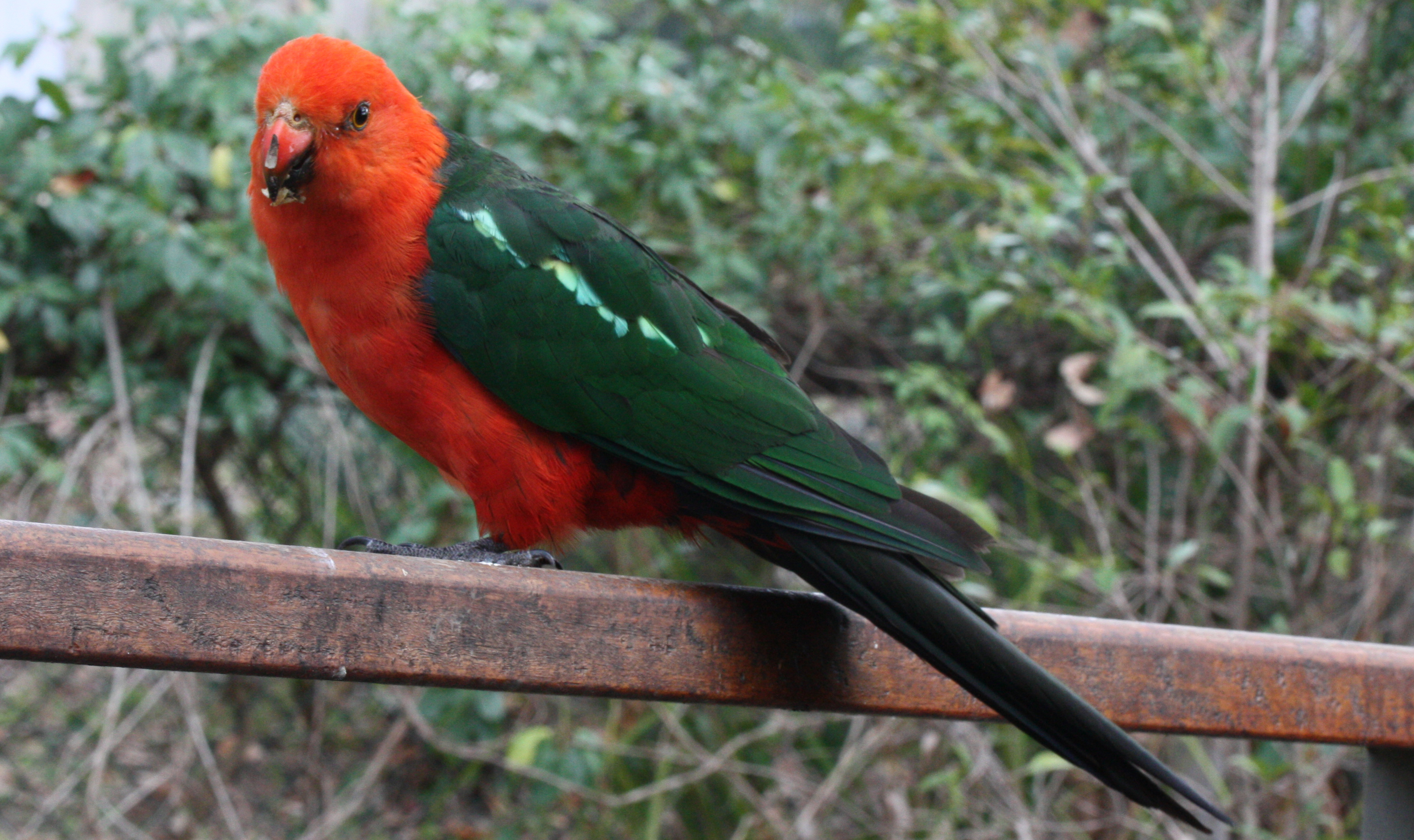
- Alisterus scapularis

Scientific classification
- Kingdom: Animalia
- Phylum: Chordata
- Class: Aves
- Order: Psittaciformes
- Family: Psittaculidae
- Subfamily: Psittaculinae
- Tribe: Polytelini; Mathews, 1916

Genera
- Alisterus; Aprosmictus; Polytelis

= Polytelini =

Tribe of birds

The Polytelini tribe belongs to the parrot family Psittaculidae and consists of three genera.

== Species ==
Image	Genus	Living species
	Alisterus Mathews, 1911	Australian king parrot, Alisterus scapularis; Moluccan king parrot, Alisterus amboinensis; Papuan king parrot, Alisterus chloropterus
	Aprosmictus Gould, 1842	Jonquil parrot, Aprosmictus jonquillaceus; Red-winged parrot, Aprosmictus erythropterus
	Polytelis Wagler, 1832	Superb parrot, Polytelis swainsonii; Regent parrot, Polytelis anthopeplus; Princess parrot, Polytelis alexandrae
