= Spinifex parrot =

Spinifex parrot may refer to the following bird species:

- Polytelis alexandrae, also known as the princess parrot
- Pezoporus occidentalis, also known as the night parrot
