= Flying High Bird Sanctuary =

- Interactive map of Flying High Bird Sanctuary
- 25°13′07″S 152°14′21″E
- Date opened: December 2002
- Location: Bruce Highway, Corner Old Creek Road, Apple Tree Creek, Queensland, Australia
- No. of animals: 3000+
- Website: www.flyinghighbirdsanctuary.net.au

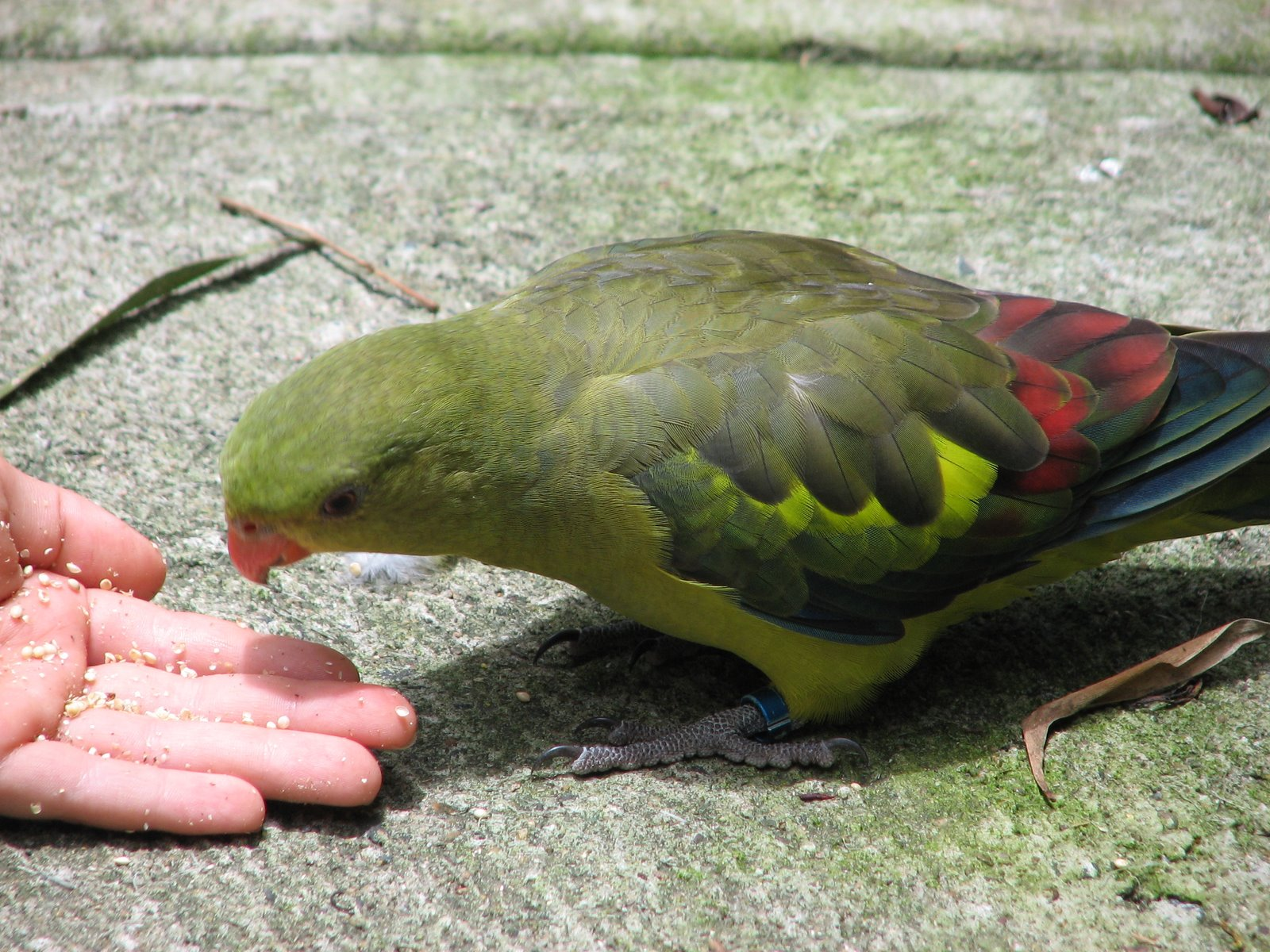
A visitor feeding a regent parrot

Flying High Bird Sanctuary (formerly Flying High Bird Habitat) is the largest free-flight aviary in Australia and has over 2000 birds. Visitors can walk around inside the aviary to see the birds. It is located on the corner of Bruce Highway and Old Creek Road, Apple Tree Creek, about 50 km south of Bundaberg in central Queensland, Australia. It was opened in 2002.

== History ==
The facility opened to the public in December 2002 as Flying High Bird Habitat. At the time, it had only the main aviary with about 300 birds. It is situated on land formerly occupied by the Apple Tree Creek school. The two school buildings were moved to serve other uses after the school closed in the late 1960s, and John Woodall started building the sanctuary on the land in 2001.

By 2010 the complex had been expanded with additional aviaries and a macaw breeding complex, and was home to almost 3000 birds. On 19 March 2010 the facility was taken over by David and Anne Tocknell, their son Matt and his wife Leisa and was renamed Flying High Bird Sanctuary. It is the largest free-flying aviary in Australia.

The Sanctuary was sold on 9 December 2015 and is now under the new management of Des and Cathy Watts. Since 2010 the Sanctuary has expanded even further with the addition of the Kangaroo and Emu enclosures, a separate enclosure for the resident owls and animal nursery. Visitors can enjoy a real hands on experience with the birds at feeding time as well purchasing food to hand feed the animals at any time of day. One of the biggest highlights for people young and old is bottle feeding and interacting with the baby goats as well as the other numerous baby chicks and ducklings. The first baby Macaw for the new owners was born March 2016. "Alpha" is hand raised and people are encouraged to interact with him and are welcome to have photos taken with him.

== Exhibits ==
The main aviary covers over 2 acres (0.81 ha) and is over 7 metres (23 ft) high. It contains 300 metres (980 ft) of trails for visitors in a rainforest setting with Australian, Asian, and South American birds.

== Breeding ==
The sanctuary breeds and hand raises birds for the pet industry, including harlequin and Catalina macaws. It has also started captive breeding programs for several native birds that will be released into the wild to augment wild bird populations.

== The future ==
New exhibits and features planned at this time include a koala enclosure, wetland attraction, separate South American and Asian free flight aviaries, a picnic area, emu and kangaroo enclosures, and a raptor aviary. These features are expected to be completed by some time in 2012.
