= King Parrot Creek =

Stream in Victoria, Australia

Coordinates: 37.15°S 145.283333°E

King Parrot Creek is a stream in Victoria, Australia. The creek flows on the eastern side of Kerrisdale, a locality approximately 25 km (16 mi) south east of Seymour, where it meets the Goulburn River.

King Parrot Creek drops around 375 metres (1230 ft) over its 48 km (30 mi) length.

King Parrot Creek was named from the fact early settlers saw Australian king parrots there in the 1820s.

== See also ==
- List of rivers of Australia
