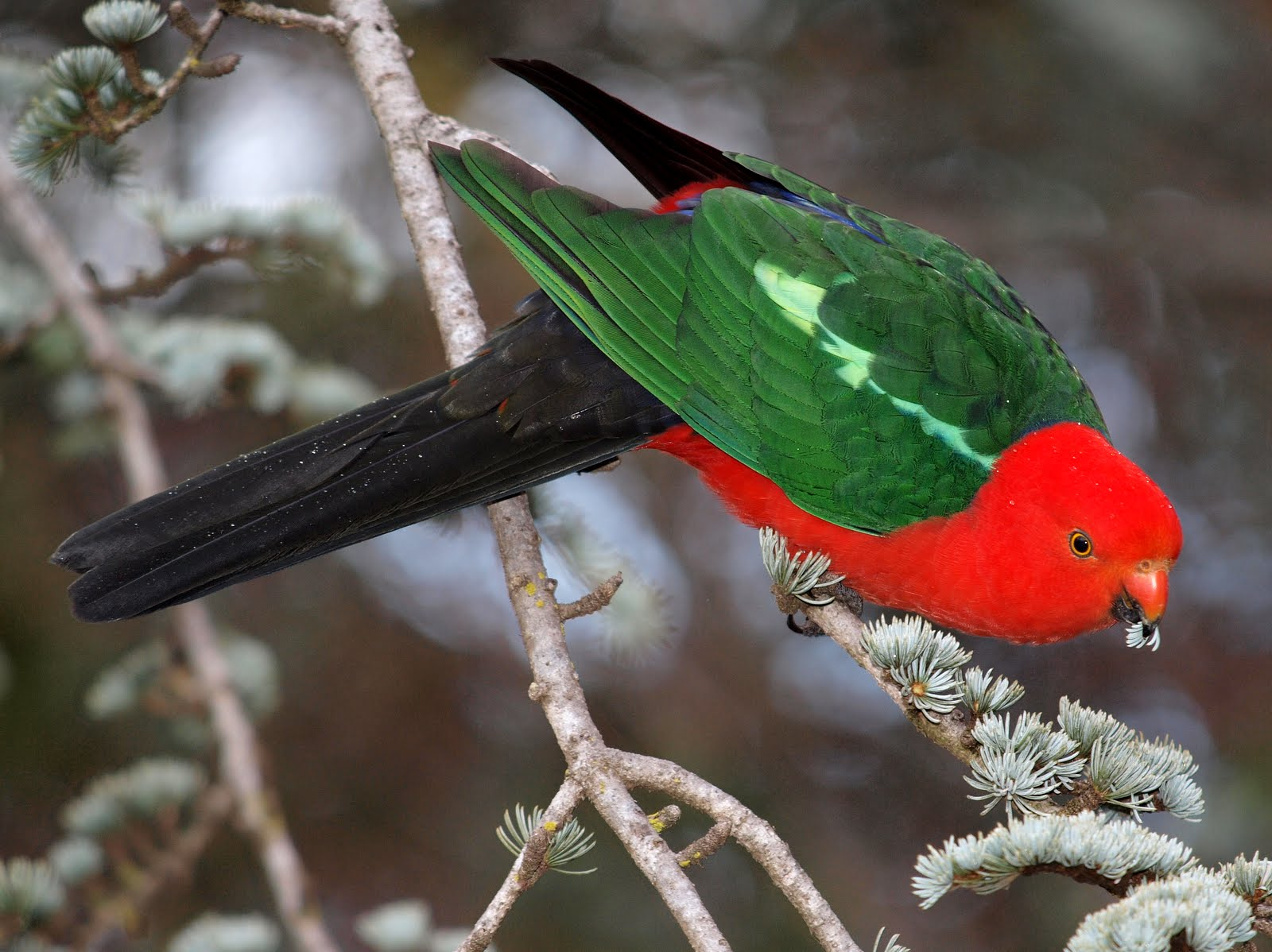
- Male Australian king parrot (Alisterus scapularis) in Canberra, Australia

Scientific classification
- Kingdom: Animalia
- Phylum: Chordata
- Class: Aves
- Order: Psittaciformes
- Family: Psittaculidae
- Tribe: Polytelini
- Genus: Alisterus; Mathews, 1911

Species
- Alisterus scapularis Alisterus chloropterus Alisterus amboinensis

= Alisterus =

Genus of birds

Alisterus is a genus of medium-sized Australasian parrots, comprising the Australian king parrot (Alisterus scapularis), the Papuan king parrot (A. chloropterus) and the Moluccan king parrot (A. amboinensis). The three species are respectively found in eastern Australia, Papua, the Moluccas and other Indonesian islands. Predominantly of red and green plumage, the long-tailed parrots are related to the genera Aprosmictus and Polytelis.

== Description ==
Medium-sized parrots, 35–43 cm (14–17 in) in length with long, broad tails. They have relatively small beaks for their size. The beaks of the adults are two colours, blackish and orange-reddish, except for the subspecies of the Moluccan king parrot, Alisterus amboinensis buruensis, which has a grey-black beak, and female of the Australian species, Alisterus scapularis, which has a grey beak.

=== Sexual dimorphism ===
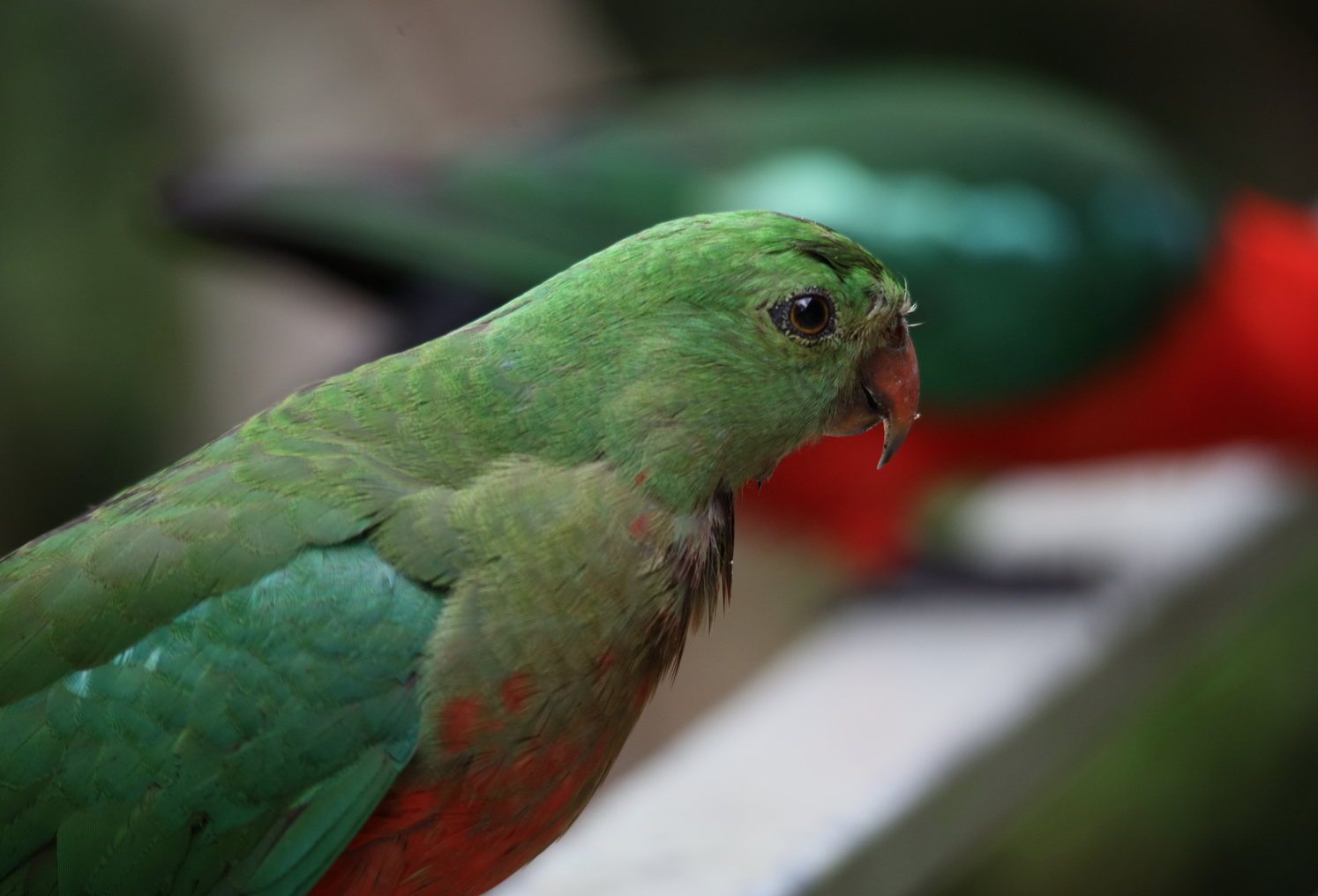
Australian king parrot (Alisterus scapularis) female plumage (green dominant), with dimorphic male plumage (red dominant) in background

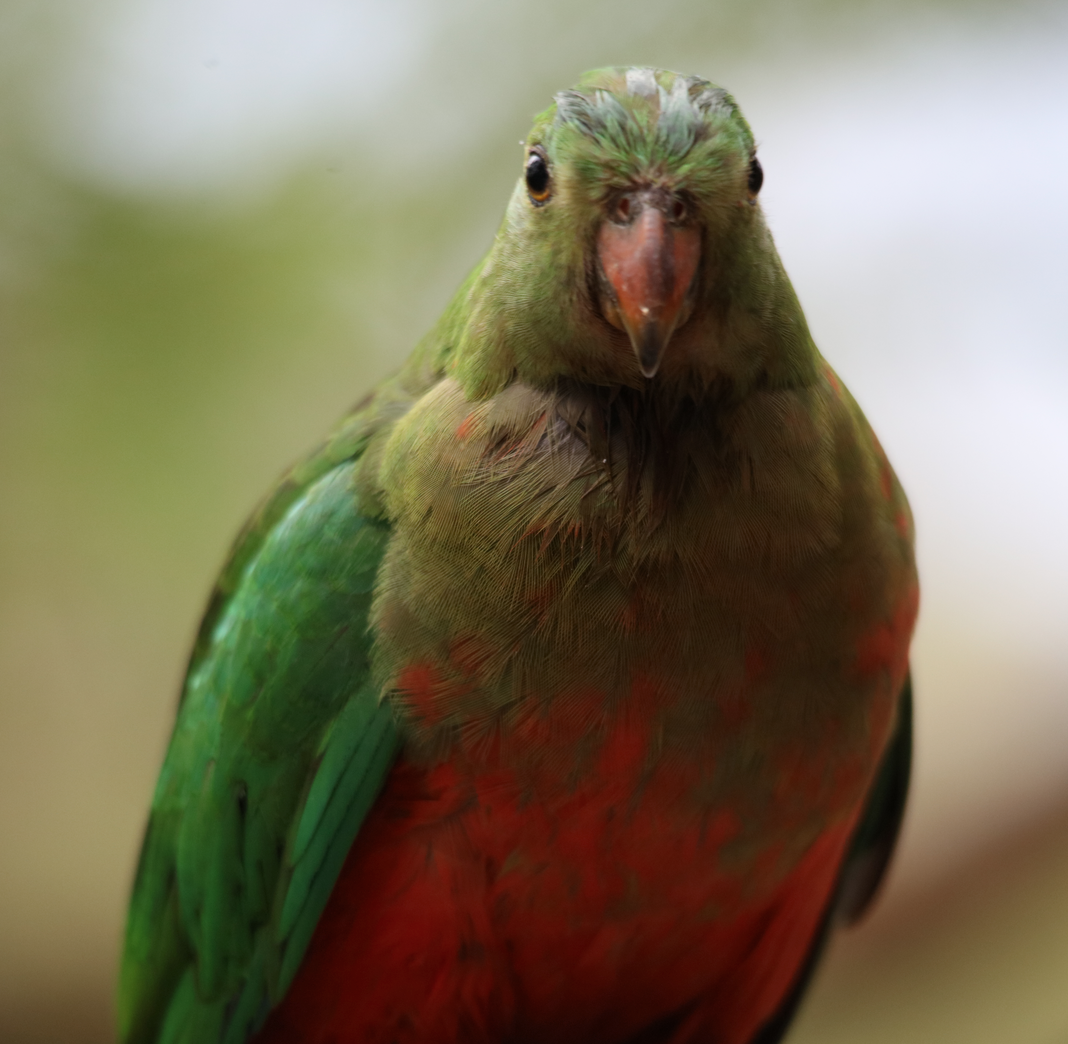
Female Australian king parrot (Alisterus scapularis)

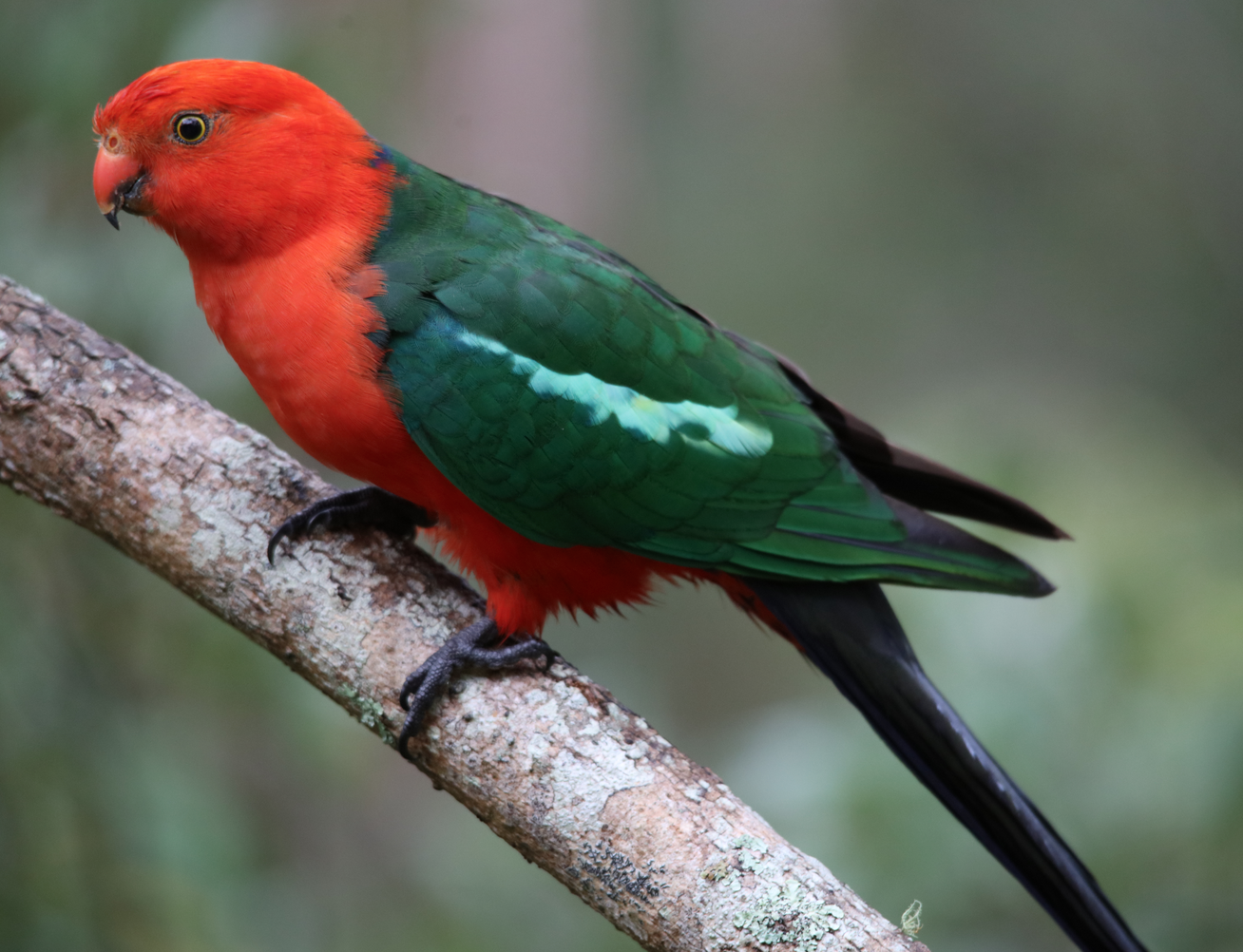
Male Australian king parrot (Alisterus scapularis)

The Papuan king parrot and the Australian king parrot show sexual dimorphism in their plumage and beak colouration, which contrast to the Moluccan king parrot, where the male and female have an identical external appearance.

The two subspecies of the Australian king parrot are similar except in size. The male has a red head and neck, red lower parts, blue back and rump, and green wings, each with a pale-green band (resembling a shoulder stripe). In the female, the head is green, the green being continuous over the neck, chest, and back. Red plumage covers the lower abdomen, and the pale-green wing band is small or absent. Juvenile males also have a green neck and head.

The three subspecies of the Papuan king parrot all show sexual dimorphism and in all three subspecies, the males can be identified by prominent broad pale-green bands on each wing. The differences in the females between subspecies are more marked than the differences in the males. The female of subspecies A. chloropterus moszkowskii has green wings, and a red head, neck, chest, and abdomen resembling the male, and differs from the male with its much smaller pale-green wing band. The females of A. chloropterus chloropterus and A. chloropterus calloterus differ from the males with broadly similar sexual dimorphism to the Australian king parrot with extended green plumage, except the chests of the females of these two Papuan king parrot subspecies have vague transverse green and red striations.

== Behaviour and ecology ==
The three species are forest-dwelling, and are found singly, in pairs, or in groups. Australian king parrots sometimes gather in groups of 30 or more around food sources, while Moluccan king parrots sometimes form groups up to 10, and the Moluccan king parrots may gather in groups of five or six. They generally feed on seeds, fruits, and berries in trees.

== Taxonomy ==
Classified in the subfamily Psittacinae within the true parrot family, the genus Alisterus was described by Australian amateur ornithologist Gregory Mathews in 1911. Mathews coined the name for his four-year-old son Alister. They were previously considered part of the genus Aprosmictus, which contains the red-winged parrot (Aprosmictus erythropterus) and olive-shouldered parrot (A. jonquillaceus).

The king parrots appear to be most closely related to the genera Aprosmictus and the long-tailed parrots of the genus Polytelis, united by similarities in food begging and contact calls by chicks, and by more recent molecular analysis in 2005. The molecular work placed this group in turn as sister to a group containing Eclectus, Tanygnathus, and Psittacula.

The three species and several subspecies of king parrots are:

Genus Alisterus – Mathews, 1911 – three species
Common name	Scientific name and subspecies	Range	Size and ecology	IUCN status and estimated population
Moluccan king parrot	Alisterus amboinensis (Linnaeus, 1766) Six subspecies: A. a. amboinensis (Linnaeus, 1766); A. a. buruensis (Salvadori, 1876); A. a. dorsalis (Quoy & Gaimard, 1830); A. a. hypophonius (S. Müller, 1843); A. a. sulaensis (Reichenow, 1881); A. a. versicolor Neumann, 1939	Numerous islands and western New Guinea of Indonesia.	Size: 35 cm (14 in) long. Male is similar to female in all six subspecies. Wings do not have a scapular band. Five subspecies have green wings and one subspecies has blue wings. Orange irises. Dark grey legs. Habitat: Diet:	LC
Papuan king parrot	Alisterus chloropterus (E.P. Ramsay, 1879) Three subspecies: A. c. callopterus (Albertis & Salvadori, 1879); A. c. chloropterus (E.P. Ramsay, 1879); A. c. moszkowskii (Reichenow, 1911)	New Guinea	Size: 36 cm (14 in) long. Three subspecies all showing sexual dimorphism. The differences in the females between subspecies are more marked than the differences in the males. The pale green band on wing is much more marked in the males. Orange irises. Dark grey legs. Habitat: Diet:	LC
Australian king parrot	Alisterus scapularis (Lichtenstein, 1816) Two subspecies: A. s. minor Mathews, 1911; A. s. scapularis (Lichtenstein, 1816)	Eastern Australia	Size: 43 cm (17 in) long. Male is mainly red and green and the female is mainly green. A band of pale green feathers on each wing is prominent in the male and small or absent in the female. Blue back and rump. Yellow irises. Grey legs. Its two subspecies are similar except in size, the northern subspecies being the smaller. Habitat: Diet:	LC

Female king parrot feeding
