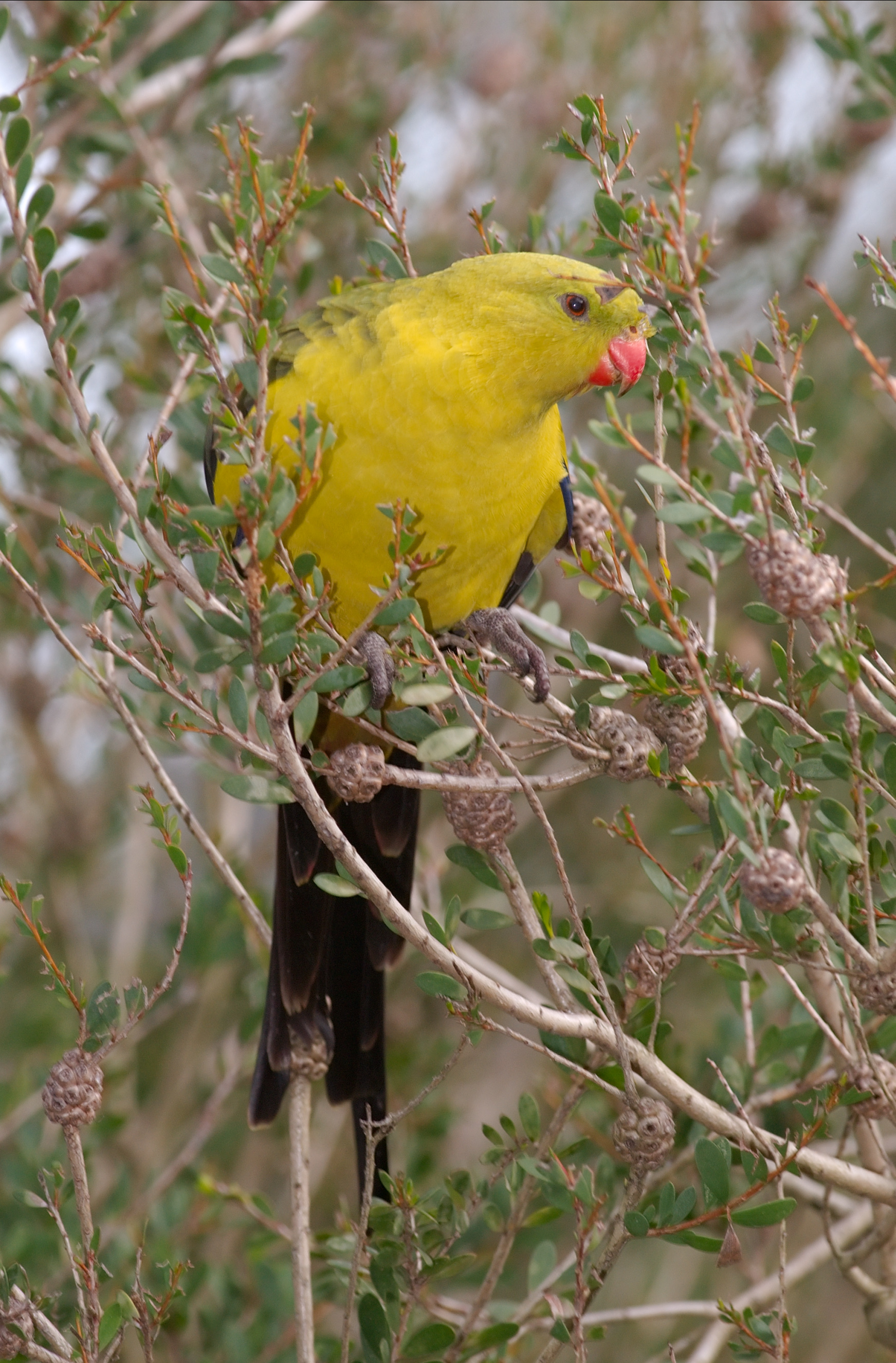

Conservation status
- Least Concern (IUCN 3.1)

Scientific classification
- Kingdom: Animalia
- Phylum: Chordata
- Class: Aves
- Order: Psittaciformes
- Family: Psittaculidae
- Genus: Polytelis
- Species: P. anthopeplus

Binomial name
- Polytelis anthopeplus (Lear, 1831)

Subspecies
- P. a. anthopeplus P. a. monarchoides

= Regent parrot =

Species of bird

The regent parrot or rock pebbler (Polytelis anthopeplus) is a bird found in southern Australia. It has predominantly yellow plumage with a green tail. The bird is found primarily in eucalyptus groves and other wooded areas of subtropical southwestern Australia, as well as in a smaller area of subtropical and temperate southeastern Australia. Seeds make up the bulk of its diet.

== Taxonomy ==
A species of Psittaculidae, allied to the tribe Polytelini, a sister taxon to Polytelis swainsonii, the superb parrot, and P. alexandrae, the princess parrot. The epithet anthopeplus is derived from ancient Greek, a compound of anthos, flower, and peplos, robe. A 2017 molecular study placed the regent parrot as an early offshoot to the genus Aprosmictus and not as closely related to the other two species.

There are two populations, morphologically similar though isolated, within the species distribution range of Southern Australia. These are described as subspecies:

- Polytelis anthopeplus anthopeplus, Southwest Australia
- Polytelis anthopeplus monarchoides Schodde, 1993. Southeast Australia

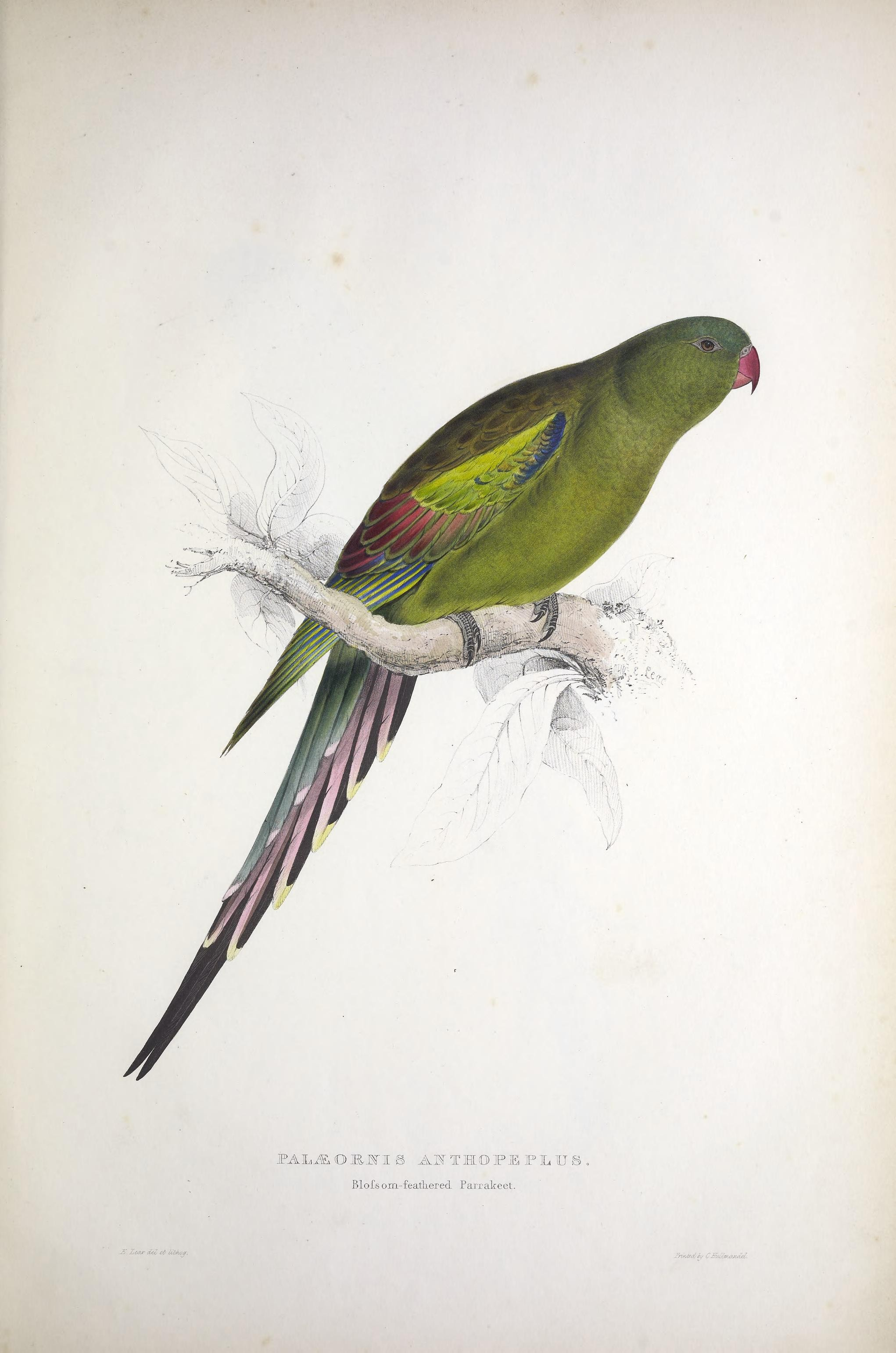
"Palæornis anthopeplus Blossom-feathered Parrakeet", the image that sees Lear cited as the author of the first description.

The regent parrot was first depicted by English author and artist Edward Lear in 1831. Lear included two images in Illustrations of the family of Psittacidae, or parrots, an early folio of lithographs with brief captions. The first plate reproduced a female specimen, given the title Palæornis anthopeplus (1831), the second was a male, Palæornis melanura (pt. 12, 1832), drawn by Lear in England. The regional origin of the parrots, presented as two species, is not supplied in the work, so the type specimen or locality for each was not formally nominated and assumed to be lost. A 1912 review by G. M. Mathews stated the source of the specimens was New South Wales, and occurred in a range that excluded the Southwest of the country. When correcting this omission, Mathews proposed the taxa named anthopeplus and melanura in Lear's folio was only found in the east and that the southwest population was a new taxon, nominated westralis. The arrangement and typification of the geographically separate groups was largely ignored by authors, until Richard Schodde published a conclusion that the origin of both Lear's specimens were from a Western Australian population, based on differences in colouration of the female plumage which he observed in the plates. Further evidence was provided by examining any possible collection and transport of the species to England, living or skinned, a possible holotype held at the Liverpool Museum, and comparison other collected data. Subsequently, the nominate subspecies of the West became P. a. anthopeplus and the eastern isolate was given a neotype and assigned to subspecies P. anthopeplus monarchoides.

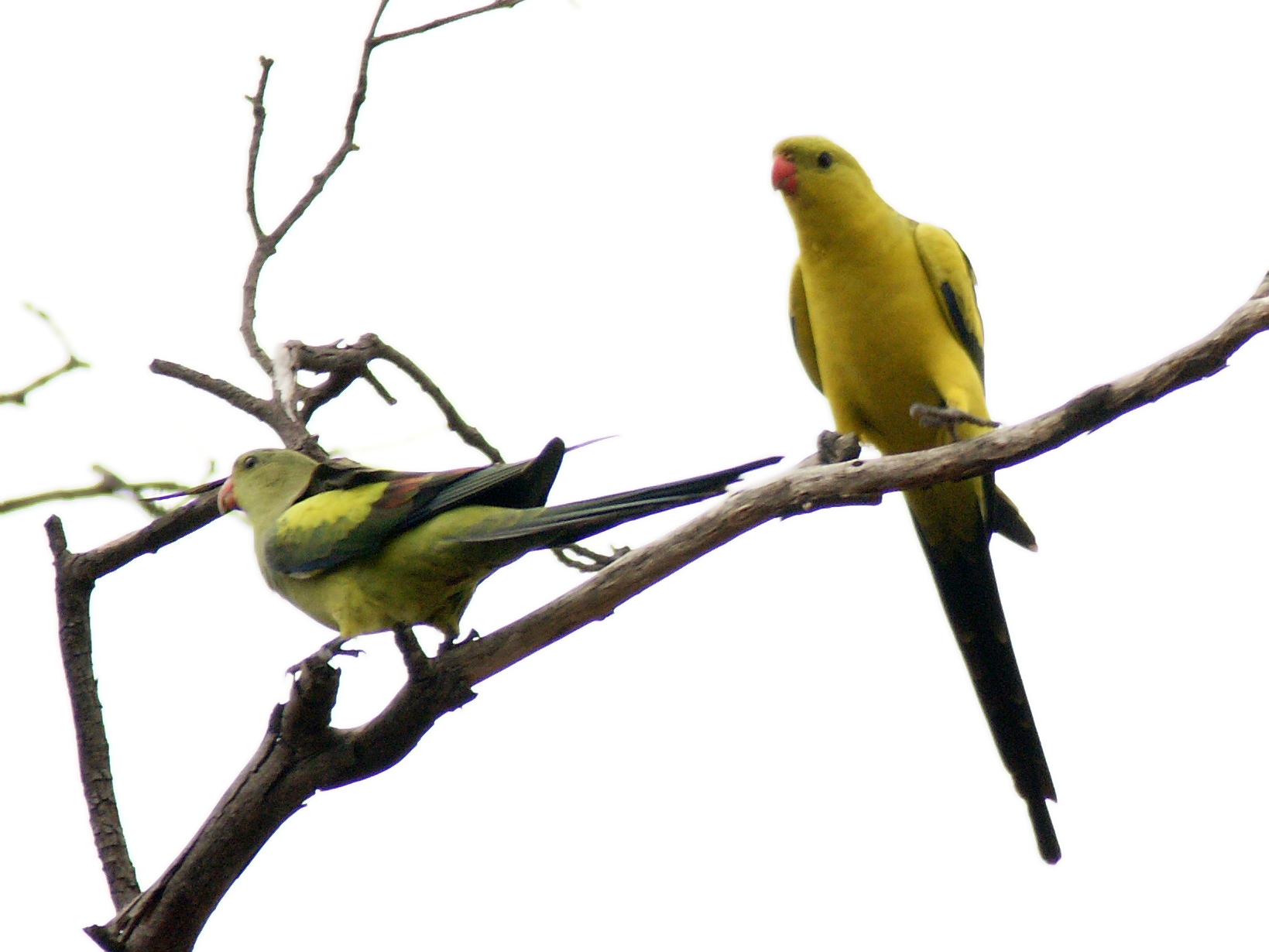
A female (left) and male (right) in Wyperfeld National Park, Australia

"Regent parrot" has been designated the official name by the International Ornithologists' Union (IOC). The species is also known variously as the rock pebbler, rock peplar, Murray smoker, Marlock parakeet, yellow king-parrot and regent parakeet. Lear's illustrations are captioned with Blossom-feathered Parrakeet to Palæornis anthopeplus and Black-tailed Parrakeet to P. melanura.

The indigenous names for the southwest subspecies in the Nyungar language, noted by Dom Serventy, include Waukanga and Wouk-un-ga, and Walkinger recorded at Avon River. A recommended orthography and pronunciation list of the region's bird names has proposed the adoption of common names yalop [yaw'lawp] and wookonga [woo'kawng'a] for this subspecies.

== Description ==
A yellowish-green parrot, long and slender, with similar patterning exhibited by the sexes. They are between 14½–16½" (37–42 cm) in length and weigh four ounces. The female is generally more green, the male much yellower. The tail feathers above are dark blue-green, those beneath are black. The male is generally yellow, with several shades on the head; its back is generally a collection of colorful shades of green; its beak generally red.

Immature birds, like the female, are duller in colour than males.

== Behaviour ==
A social bird, found in pairs or joining up to twenty others in flocks. The southwest subspecies, where it is common to abundant, may occur in mobs of up to one hundred birds. This produces an attractive spectacle when in flight. The movement in flight is fast and erratic, though described as graceful, with swept back wings.

=== Feeding ===
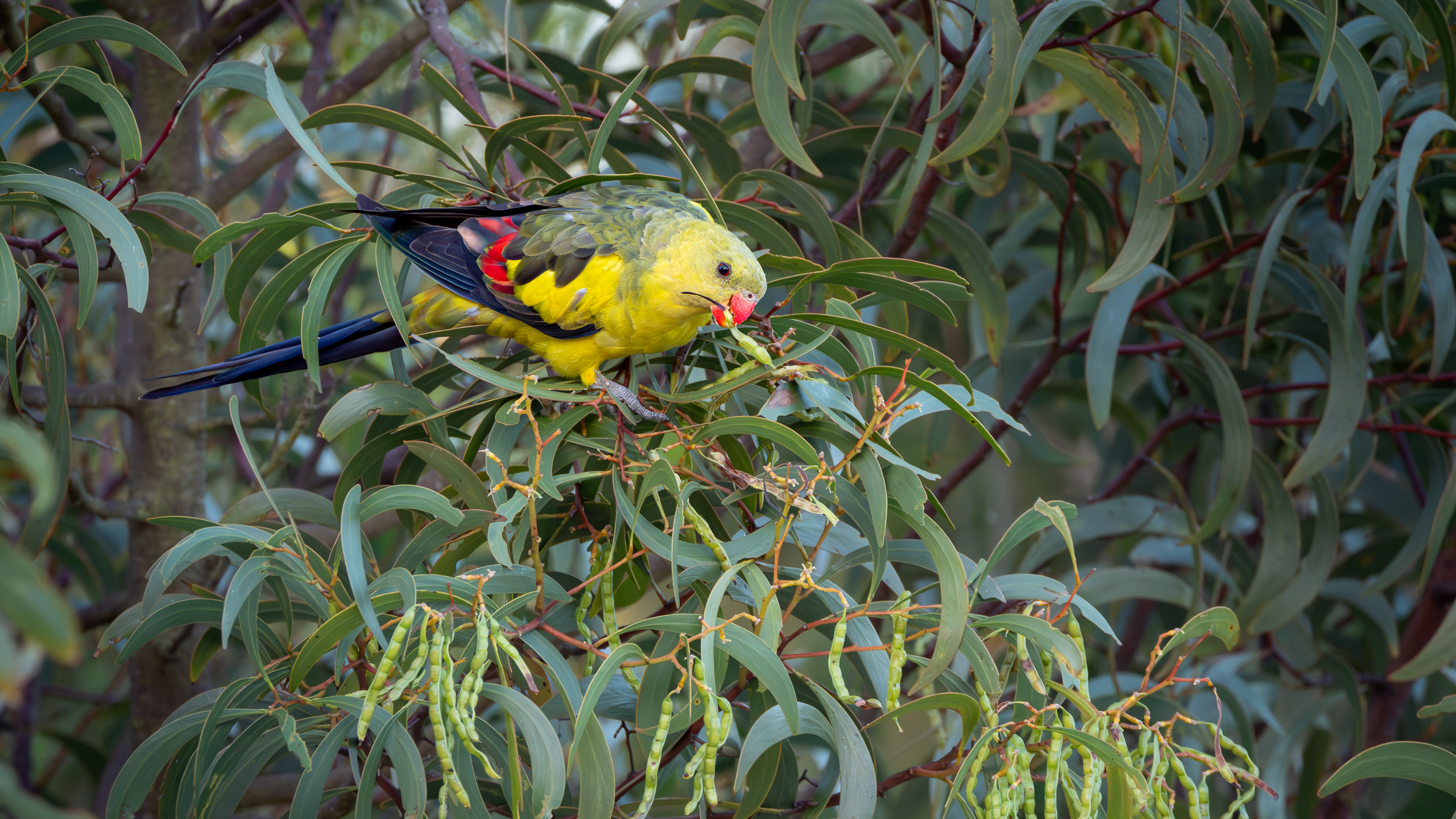
Adult feeding on seeds of golden wattle (Acacia pycnantha)

Most feeding activity is on the ground, foraging for grass seed. They also seek seed and blossoms in the limbs of trees, usually acacia and eucalypt species. Their diet also includes fruit, leaf buds and nuts of native species. The western subspecies has adapted to feed on fruits and wheat, or other cereals, introduced throughout the range after European settlement of the region.

=== Reproduction ===
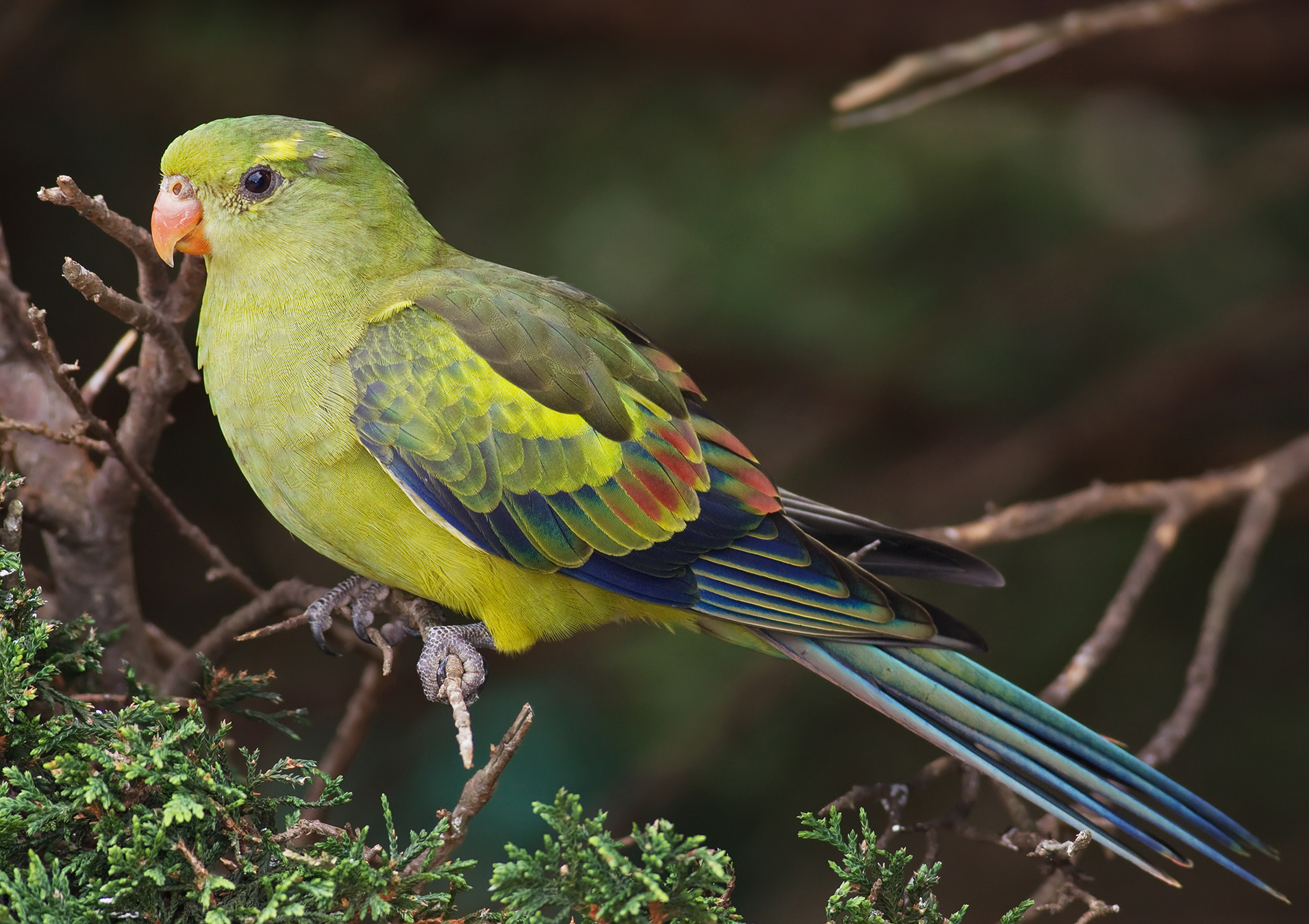
Juvenile at Walk-in Aviary, Canberra, Australia

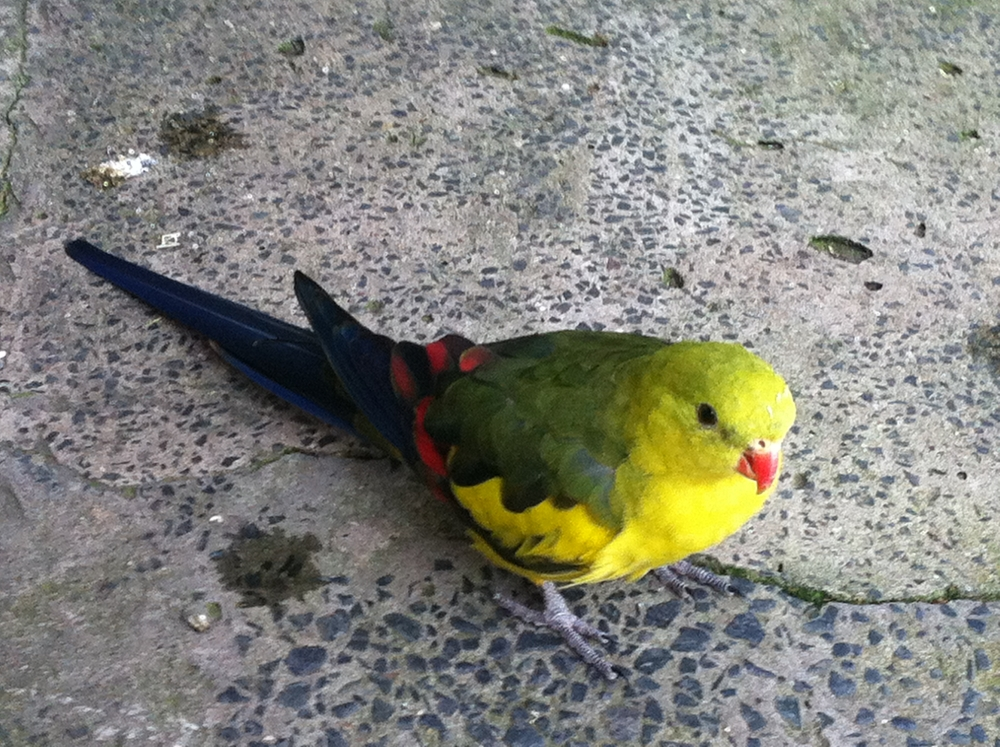
Male at Symbio Wildlife Park, Australia

Nesting is at the base of a tree hollow of great depth, up to fifteen feet within the main stem of the plant. The site is usually a large eucalyptus, with a hollow in the trunk that may reach almost to ground level, where the female lays around four eggs.

The female broods 3-8 eggs for approximately 21 days. During this period she seldom departs from the nest, if at all, and is fed by the male. When the young have hatched, they are cared for by both the male and female. During this period, they can be fed several times their normal portion of feed, which they readily convey to their young. The young begin to fly at about 5 weeks. Sexual maturity is reached at about 2 years of age.

== Conservation ==
While the western subspecies (P. anthopeplus anthopeplus) is listed as "lower risk" or "least concern", the eastern subspecies (P. anthopeplus monarchoides) is listed as vulnerable under the Australian Environment Protection and Biodiversity Conservation Act 1999. A recovery plan for the subspecies was published in 2011. The bird is regarded as an agricultural pest in Western Australia.

== Captivity ==
The species is traded as an aviary bird, referred to as the rock pebbler or regents parrot, the bird should only be acquired by experienced handlers and placed in free flying aviaries. They are not suitable for the inexperienced carer or as pets.

Captive regent parrots thrive on chopped mixtures for large parrots. They also like eggplant, fruit, sprouting seeds and a small assortment of insects. Unlike most birds parrots do not require grit in their diet, grit should only be given when a certified avian veterinarian prescribes it for digestion aid if the bird is ill. An occasional fresh willow or fruit tree branch to "spruce up" their quarters seems to please the birds. The regent parrot is naturally hardy, so being careful to protect them from drafts and the like is unnecessary. However, they should be protected from excessive cold, as such is uncommon in their natural habitat.

== See also ==
- List of parrots
- List of Western Australian birds
- Hogwash Bend Conservation Park
