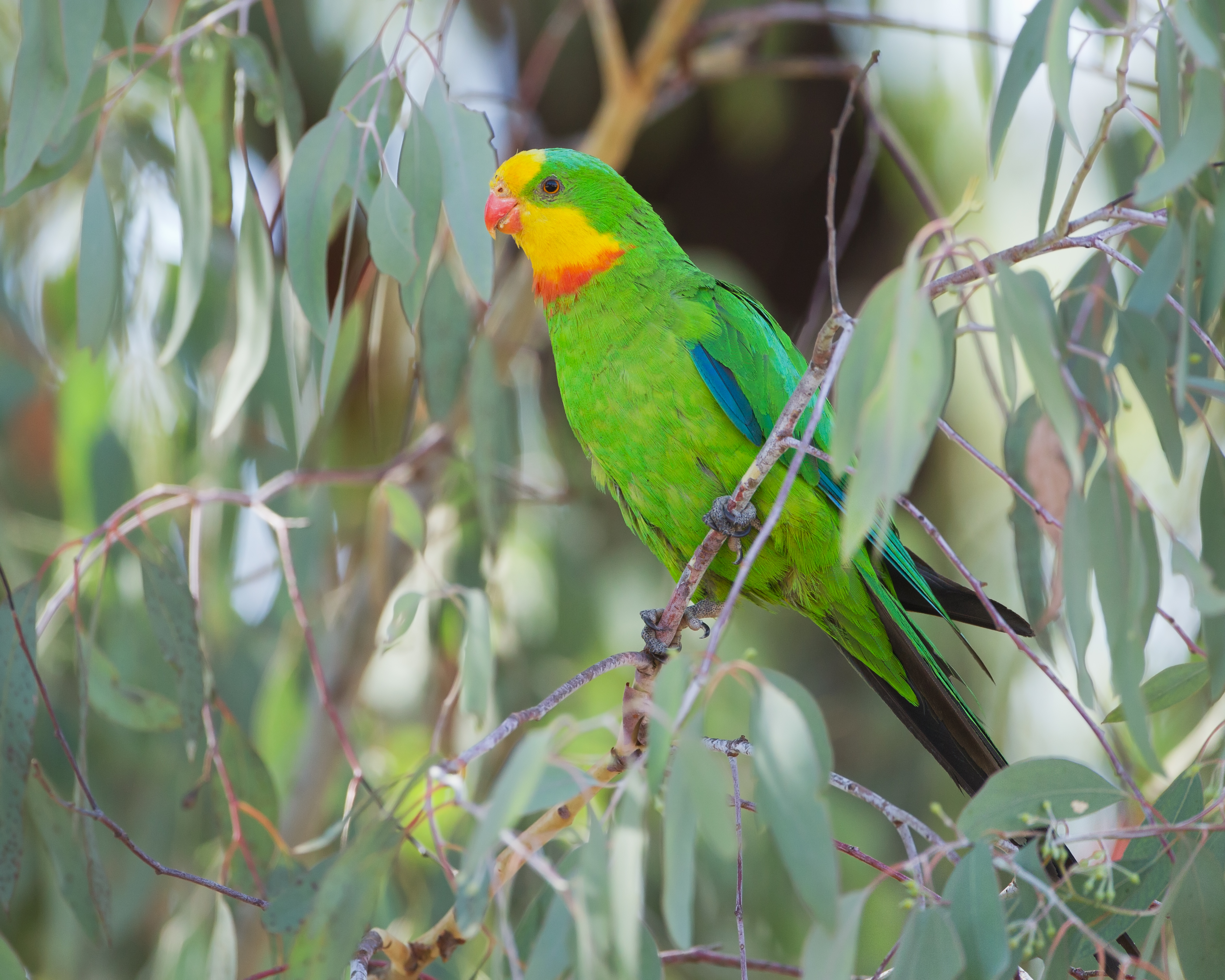
- Adult male in Canberra, Australia

Conservation status
- Least Concern (IUCN 3.1)

Scientific classification
- Kingdom: Animalia
- Phylum: Chordata
- Class: Aves
- Order: Psittaciformes
- Family: Psittaculidae
- Genus: Polytelis
- Species: P. swainsonii

Binomial name
- Polytelis swainsonii (Desmarest, 1826)

= Superb parrot =

Species of bird

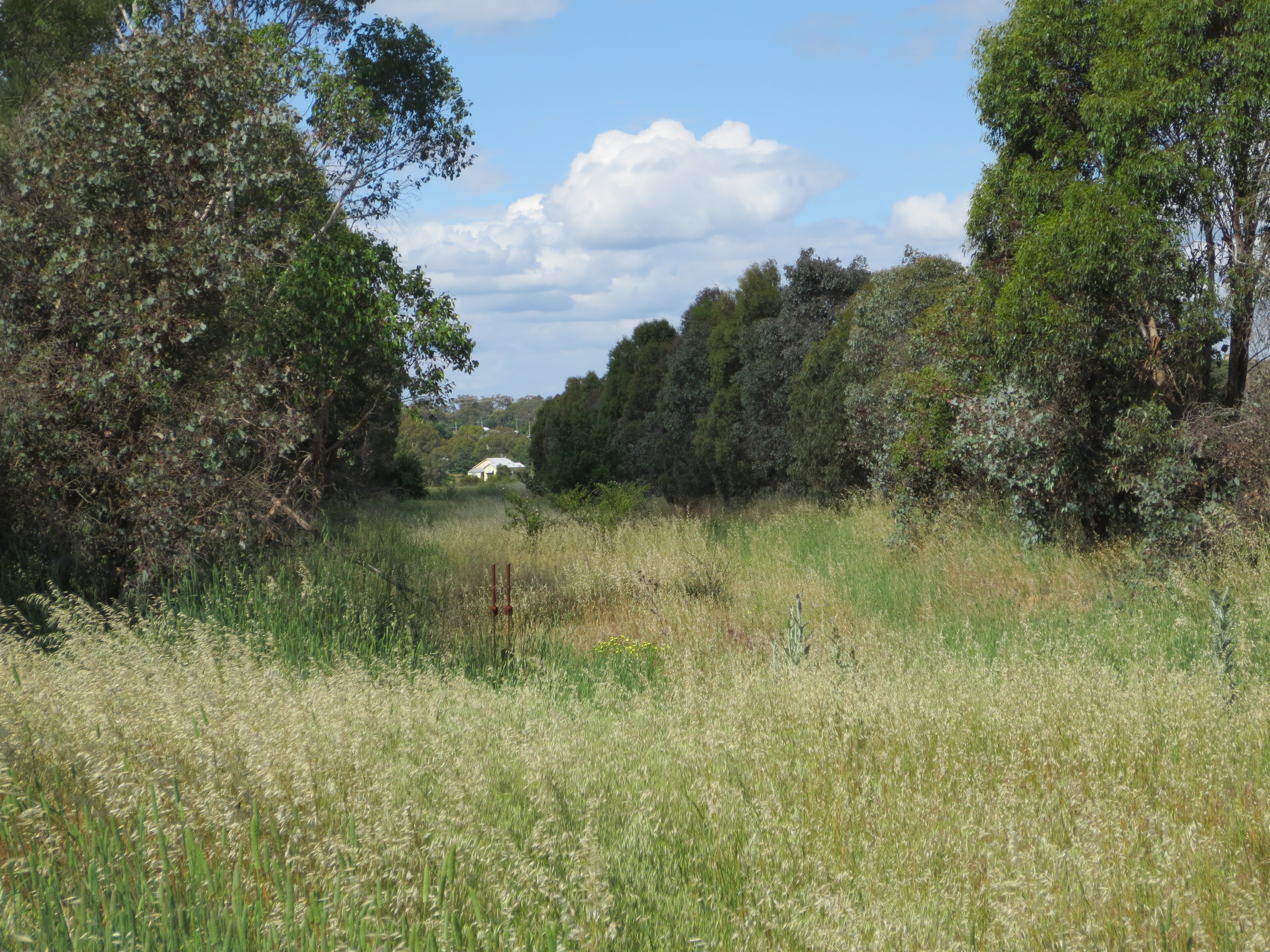
Restored habitat for the Superb parrot on an abandoned railway line

The superb parrot (Polytelis swainsonii), also known as Barraband's parrot, Barraband's parakeet, or green leek parrot, is a parrot native to south-eastern Australia. It is a dimorphic species and one of three species in the genus Polytelis.

The superb parrot is mostly bright green with darker flight feathers and is about 40 cm (16 in) long with a long pointed tail. Adult males have continuous yellow foreheads and throats, with a red horizontal band across the border of the throat.

== Taxonomy ==
First described by French naturalist Anselme Gaëtan Desmarest in 1826, the superb parrot is one of three species in the genus Polytelis of long-tailed parrots. Common names include superb parrot and, in avicultural circles, Barraband's parrot or parakeet, named after the artist Jacques Barraband who illustrated it for Francois Le Vaillant in 1801 or green leek (although the last is applied to several unrelated species). Its closest relative is the regent parrot.

== Description ==
The superb parrot is medium-sized, bright green, approximately 40 cm (16 in) long, and has long tail feathers, a yellow-green neck, and yellow-orange irises. The adult male has a scarlet band on its upper chest and a bright yellow face and throat. The adult female has a pale blue-green face, greyish-green throat, a variable tinged russet-pink fore-throat, and orange thighs. Juveniles have brown irises and otherwise resemble females. The male has adult coloured plumage at the age of about one year.

== Distribution and habitat ==
An Australian endemic, the superb parrot is restricted to the dry (sclerophyll) woodlands of New South Wales and Victoria. There is estimated to be at least 10,000 individuals in the wild.

=== Important Bird Areas ===
BirdLife International has identified the following sites as being important for superb parrot conservation:

- Barmah-Millewa
- Murrumbidgee Red Gums
- South-west Slopes of NSW

== Behaviour ==
It nests on hollow limb or a hole in a tree. During breeding season, small flocks of males often forage for food alone. Pairs may nest in a loose colonial system of as many as 6 pairs, so females are in the neighborhood at this time. The diet consists mainly of eucalypt flowers, fruits, nectar and pollen. It consumes seeds and green heads of the yellow box (Eucalyptus melliodora).

== Conservation status ==
=== International ===
Due to ongoing habitat loss in Australia, small population size and limited range, the superb parrot was evaluated as Vulnerable on the IUCN Red List of Threatened Species, until it was downlisted to Least Concern in 2012. It is listed on Appendix II of CITES.

=== Australia ===
Superb parrots are listed as vulnerable under the Australian Environment Protection and Biodiversity Conservation Act 1999. Their conservation status also varies from state to state within Australia; for example, the superb parrot is listed as threatened on the Victorian Flora and Fauna Guarantee Act (1988). Under this Act, an Action Statement for the recovery and future management of this species has been prepared.

=== Threatening processes ===
During February–June 2005, timber logging in the Barmah State Forest destroyed 60 percent of the nesting colonies of the superb parrot (6,000 tonnes or 6,600 short tons of river red gums): with fewer than 150 breeding in Victoria, this has severely compromised their chances of survival.

In December 2008, dozens of reports were filed of superb parrots being hit by cars. NPWS wildlife officials speculated that the parrots had gorged on grain spilled from an uncovered truck and became unable to move, eventually being hit by automobiles.

== Gallery ==
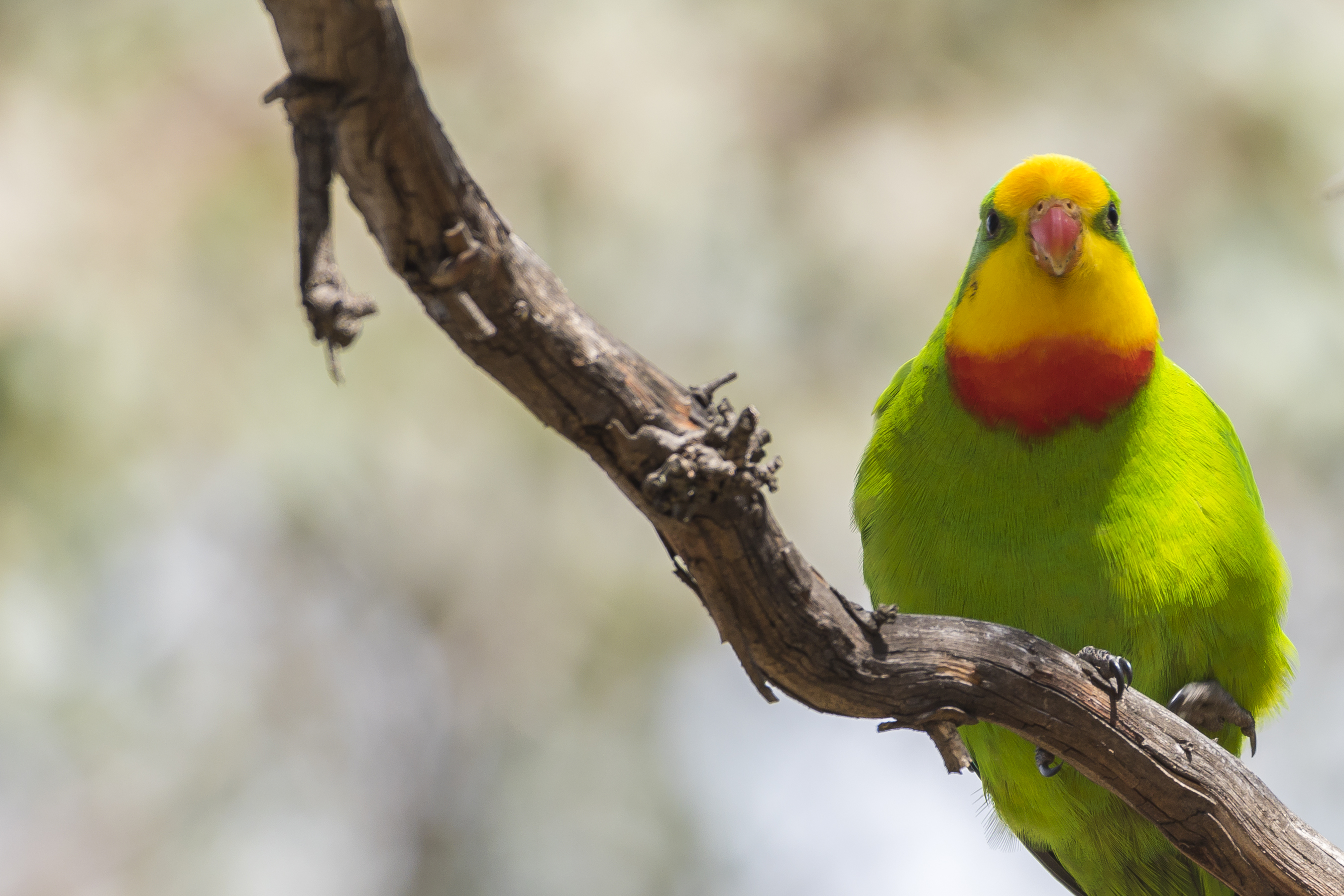
Adult male superb parrot in Canberra

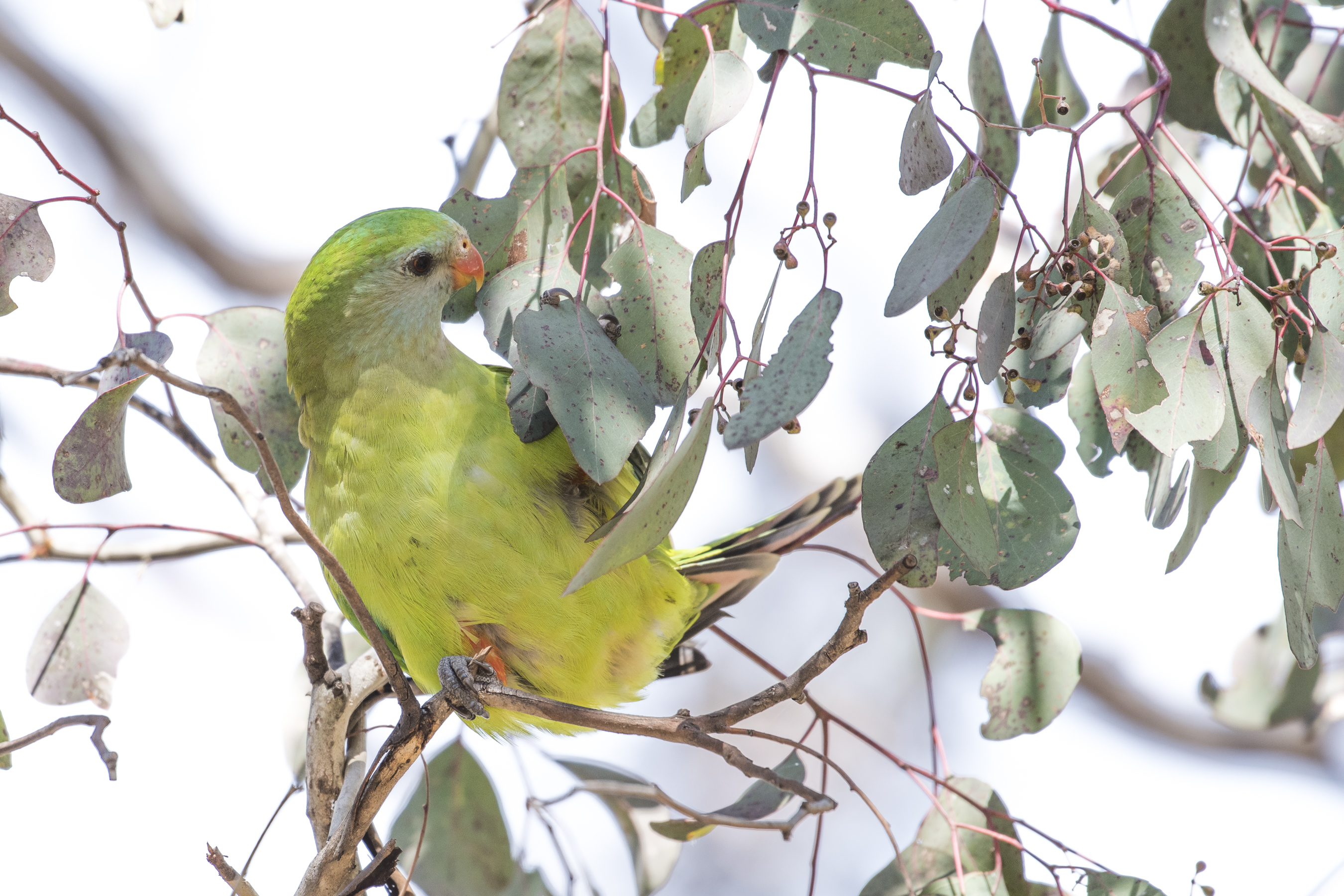
Adult female superb parrot in Canberra

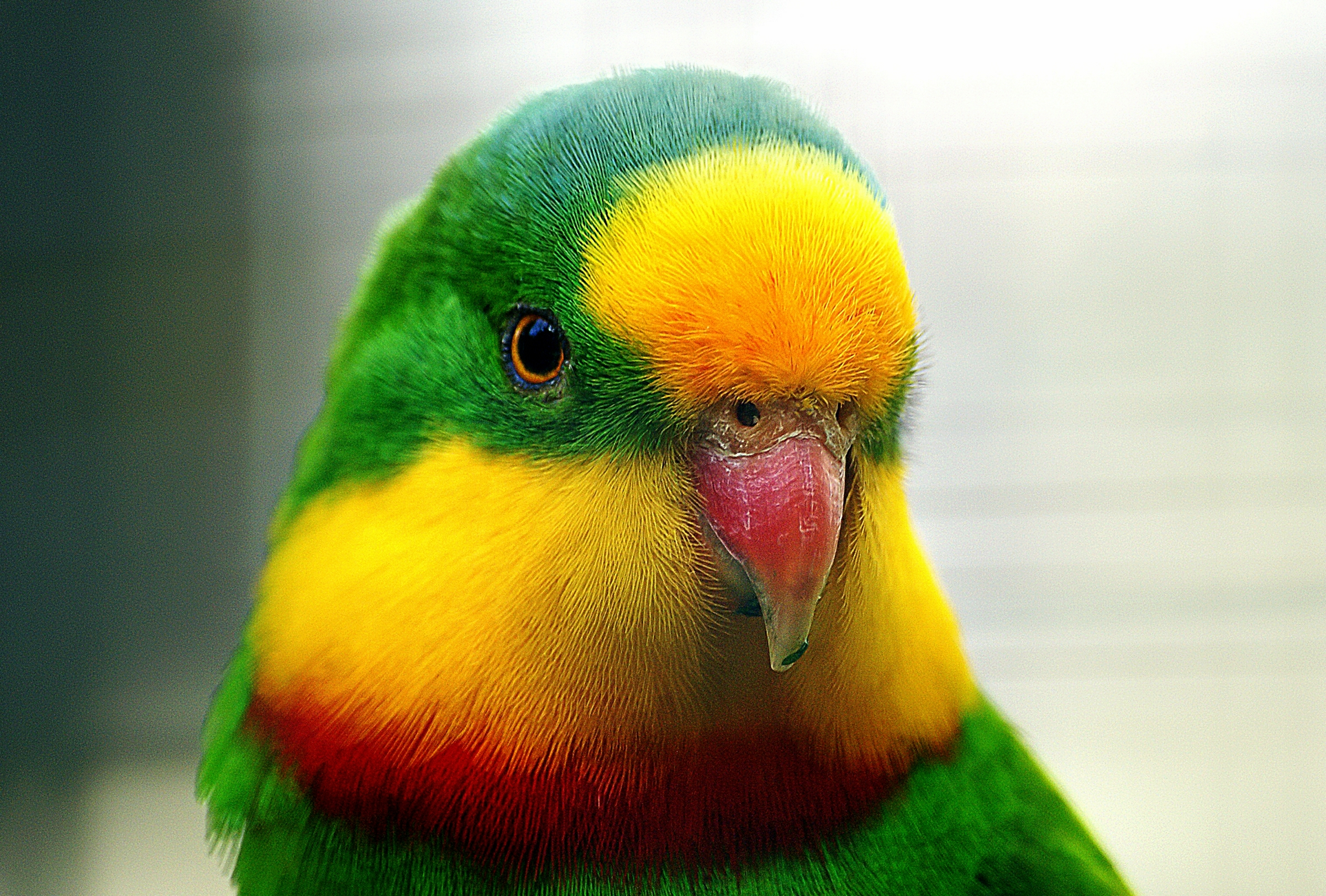
Closeup of male
