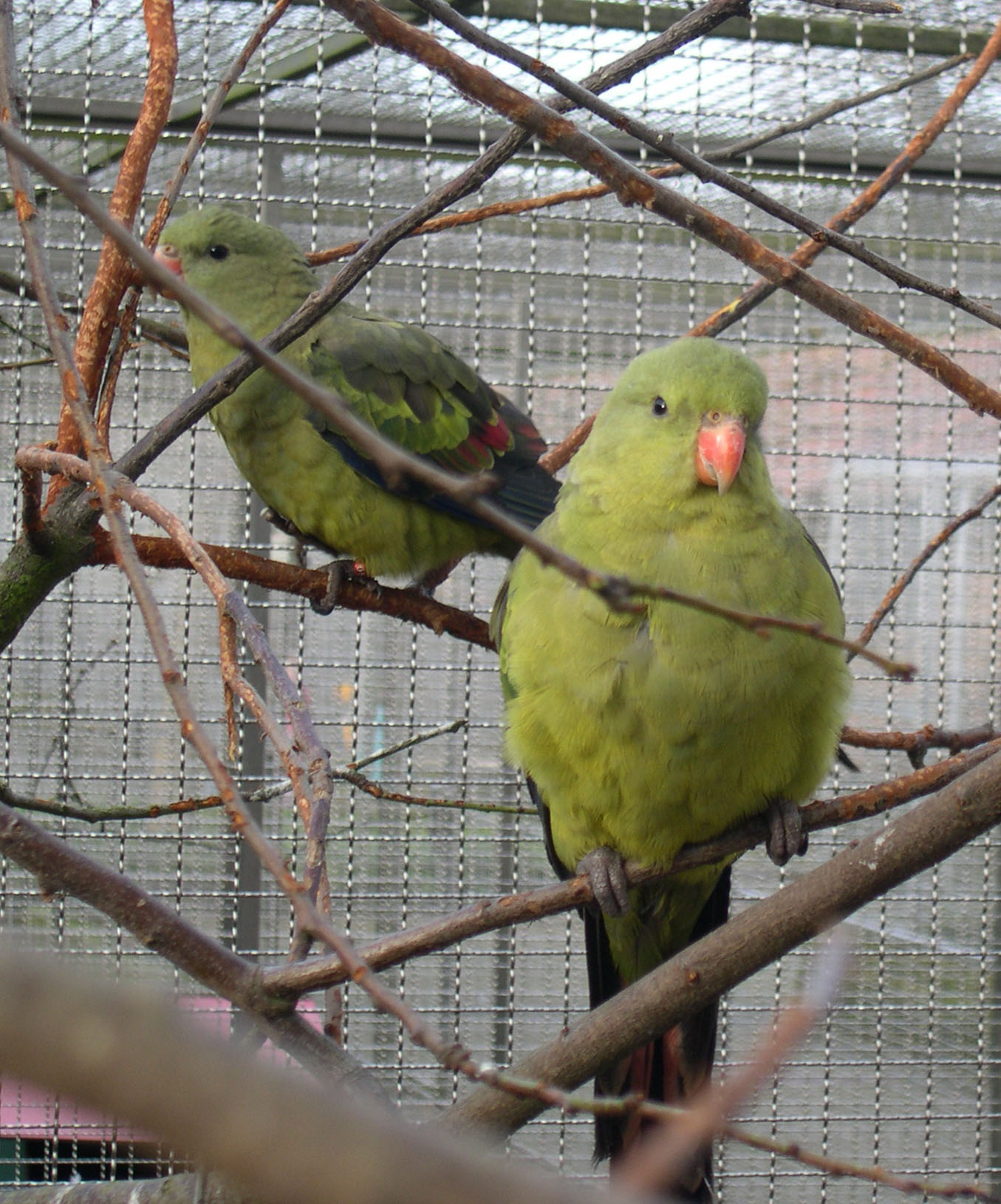
- Regent parrots, Polytelis anthopeplus

Scientific classification
- Kingdom: Animalia
- Phylum: Chordata
- Class: Aves
- Order: Psittaciformes
- Family: Psittaculidae
- Tribe: Polytelini
- Genus: Polytelis; Wagler, 1832

Type species
- Psittacus barrabandi Swainson, 1821

Species
- Polytelis alexandrae Polytelis anthopeplus Polytelis swainsonii

= Polytelis =

Genus of birds

The genus Polytelis (literally translates into 'magnificent') of the family Psittaculidae consists of three species long-tailed parrot endemic to Australia. Traditionally, it was included in the Australian broad-tailed parrots (tribe Platycercini), but molecular studies place the genus within the Polytelini.

A 2017 molecular study placed the regent parrot as an early offshoot to the genus Asprosmictus and not as closely related to the other two species.

== Taxonomy ==
The genus has three species.

Genus Polytelis – Wagler, 1832 – three species
Common name	Scientific name and subspecies	Range	Size and ecology	IUCN status and estimated population
Superb parrot	Polytelis swainsonii (Desmarest, 1826)	New South Wales and Victoria.	Size: Habitat: Diet:	LC
Regent parrot	Polytelis anthopeplus (Lear, 1831) Two subspecies: Polytelis anthopeplus anthopeplus (Lear) 1831; Polytelis anthopeplus monarchoides Schodde 1993	southern Australia.	Size: Habitat: Diet:	LC
Princess parrot or Princess of Wales (POW) parakeet	Polytelis alexandrae Gould, 1863	Australia	Size: Habitat: Diet:	NT
