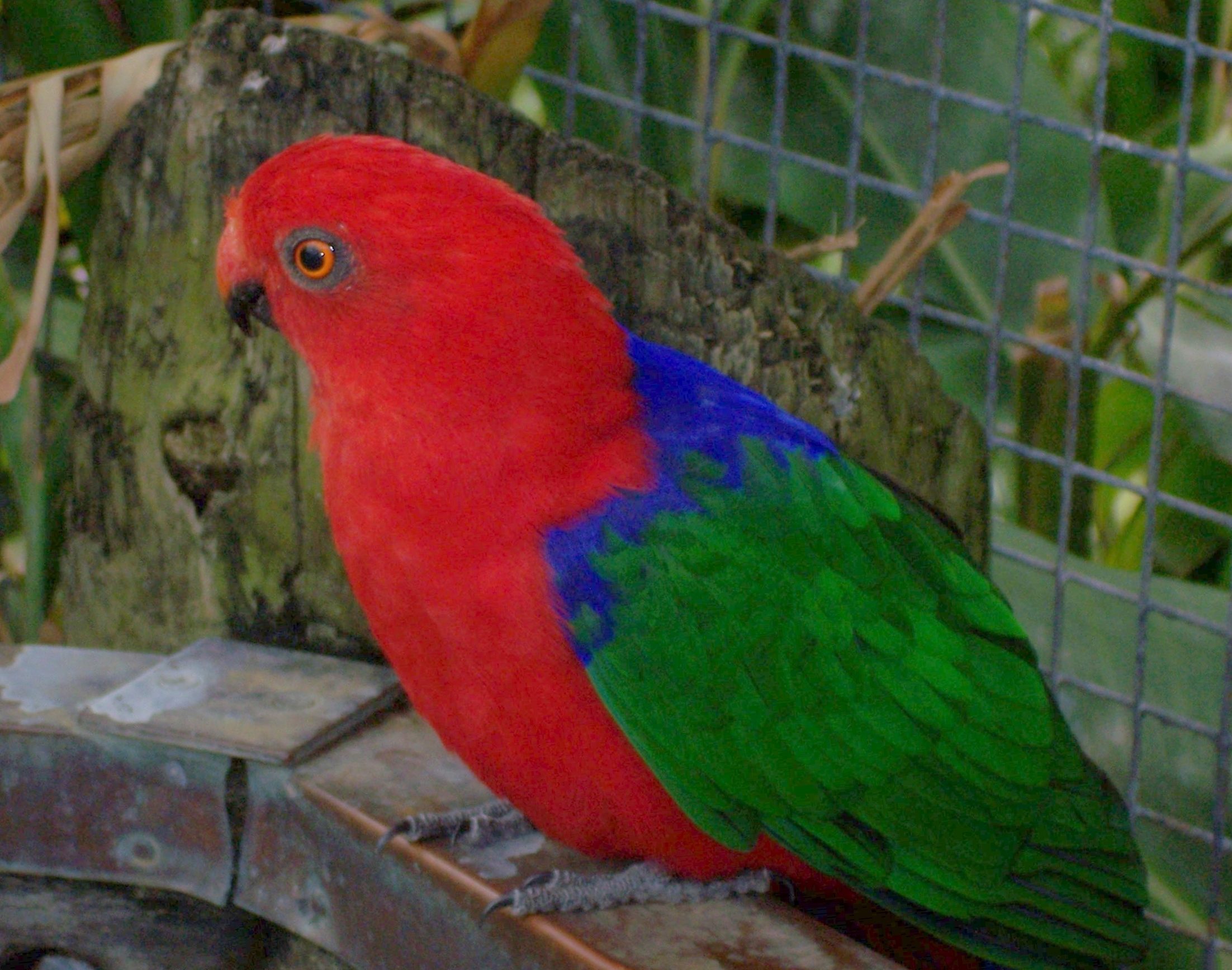
- Nominate subspecies at Brevard Zoo, Florida, USA

Conservation status
- Least Concern (IUCN 3.1)

Scientific classification
- Kingdom: Animalia
- Phylum: Chordata
- Class: Aves
- Order: Psittaciformes
- Family: Psittaculidae
- Genus: Alisterus
- Species: A. amboinensis

Binomial name
- Alisterus amboinensis (Linnaeus, 1766)

Synonyms
- Psittacus amboinensis Linnaeus, 1766

= Moluccan king parrot =

Species of bird

The Moluccan king parrot (Alisterus amboinensis) is a parrot endemic to Peleng Island, Maluku, and West Papua in Indonesia. It is sometimes referred to as the Ambon king parrot or Amboina king parrot, but this is potentially misleading, as it is found on numerous other islands than Ambon. The male and female are similar in appearance, with a predominantly red head and underparts, green wings (blue in one subspecies), and blue back and tail. Six subspecies are recognised, but only a few of these are regular in aviculture. In the wild, it inhabits rainforests and feeds on fruits, berries, seeds and buds.

== Taxonomy ==
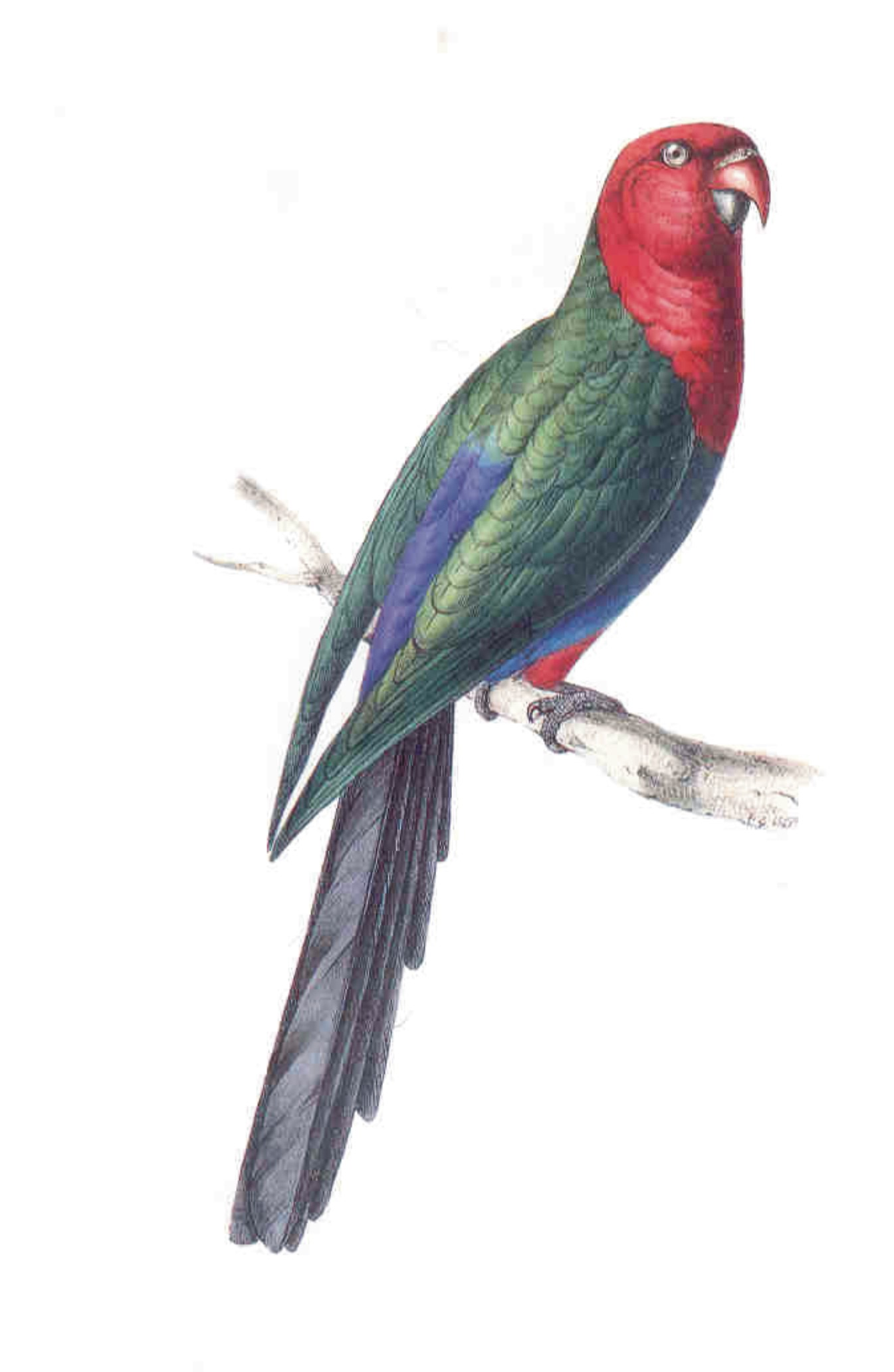
Image of a colour lithograph of a Moluccan king parrot produced by William Swainson in the first volume of Zoological Illustrations

In 1760 the French zoologist Mathurin Jacques Brisson included a description of the Moluccan king parrot in his Ornithologie based on a specimen collected on the island of Ambon in Indonesia. He used the French name La perruche rouge d'Amboine and the Latin name Psittaca amboinensis coccinea. Although Brisson coined Latin names, these do not conform to the binomial system and are not recognised by the International Commission on Zoological Nomenclature. When in 1766 the Swedish naturalist Carl Linnaeus updated his Systema Naturae for the twelfth edition he added 240 species that had been previously described by Brisson. One of these was the Moluccan king parrot. Linnaeus included a terse description, coined the binomial name Psittacus amboinensis and cited Brisson's work. This species is now placed in the genus Alisterus which was introduced by the Australian amateur ornithologist Gregory Mathews in 1911.

The Moluccan king parrot is one of three species collectively known as king parrots found in Australia, Papua New Guinea, and Indonesia.

There are six subspecies:

- A. a. amboinensis (Linnaeus, 1766) is the nominate subspecies and found on Ambon and Seram.
- A. a. buruensis (Salvadori, 1876) is found on Buru in central Maluku.
- A. a. dorsalis (Quoy & Gaimard, 1830) is found in West Papua. The red plumage is slightly darker in this subspecies.
- A. a. hypophonius (S. Müller, 1843) has all blue wings and is endemic to Halmahera in northern Maluku.
- A. a. sulaensis (Reichenow, 1881) is found on the Sula Islands.
- A. a. versicolor Neumann, 1939 is endemic to the island of Peleng of the Banggai Islands.

== Description ==
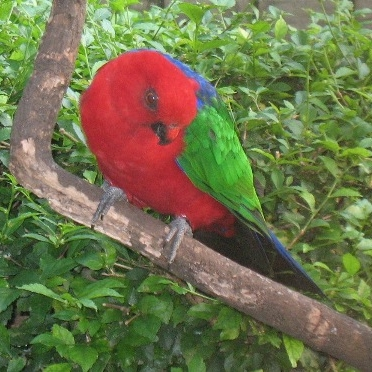
At the bird park in Taman Mini Indonesia Indah

An adult Moluccan king parrot measures 35–40 cm (14 in) in length and has a red head and chest, outer wings dull green (except in subspecies A. a. hypophonius, which are blue), mantle, lesser wing coverts and tail-coverts dark purple-blue. Tail darker blackish blue, irises orange, and the legs are dark grey. The lower mandible is blackish, and the upper mandible is orange-red with a blackish tip, except in the subspecies A. a. buruensis, where the entire bill is blackish. Unlike the other species of king parrots, the Moluccan king parrot does not display sexual dimorphism; that is, the sexes have similar plumage. Juvenile birds have a dark-brown bill tipped paler, greenish mantle, dark brown irises and red-tips to lateral tail feathers. Birds reach maturity in one year.

== Behavior ==
Encountered alone or in pairs, occasionally in small groups, it mainly frequents dense cover in the lower and mid-levels of forests. It is inconspicuous and rather quiet, except in flight. It consumes fruit, berries, seeds and buds. Nesting takes place in a tree-hollow. The breeding season begins in February and March, although breeding has not been observed in the wild, in captivity the clutch consists of two eggs which are incubated for 19 days. After hatching the chicks are ready to fledge at nine weeks old.

== Habitat and status ==
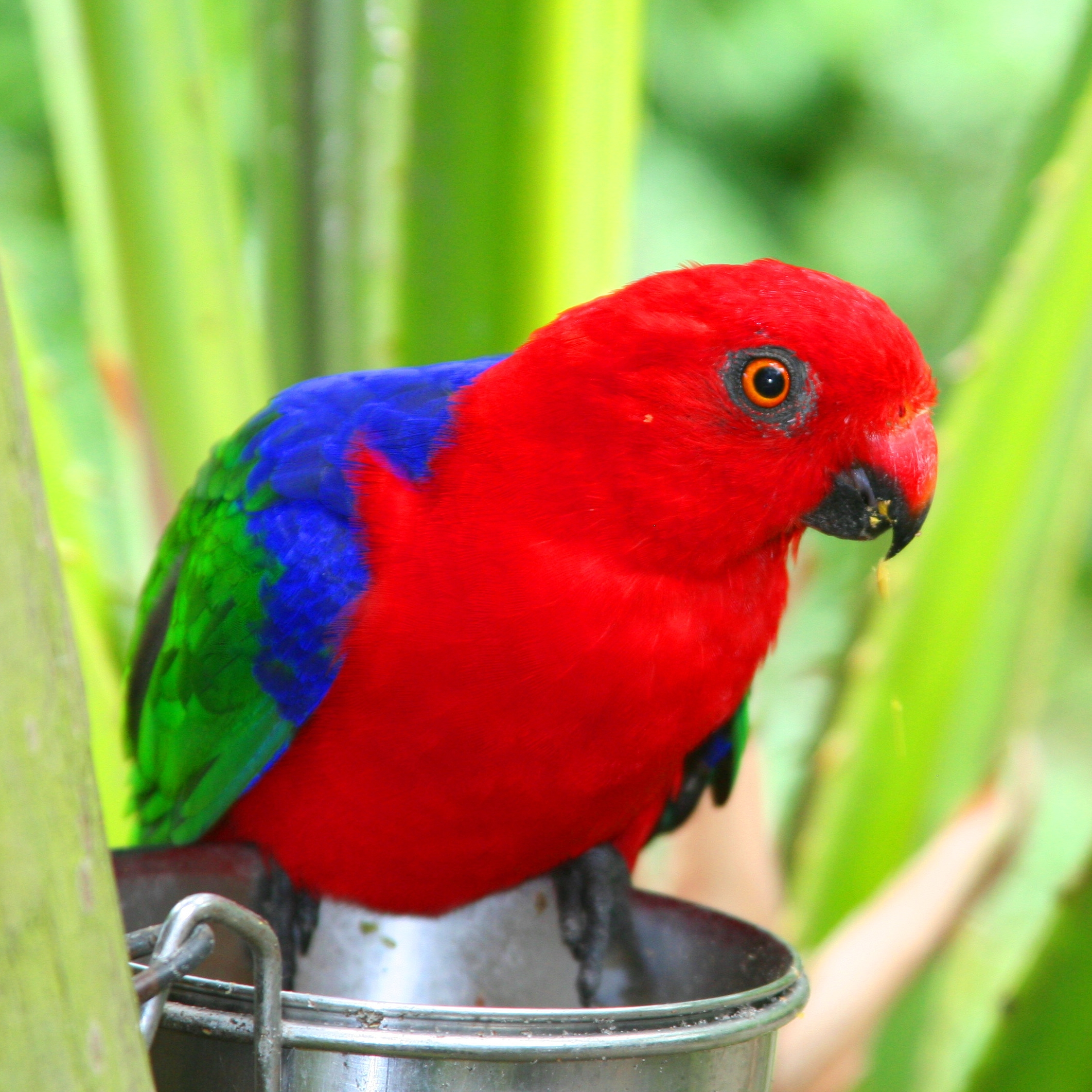
At Brevard Zoo

The Moluccan king parrot inhabits rainforests, but sometimes enters nearby plantations and gardens. Exceptionally, it occurs at altitude up to 2100 m, but more commonly below 1200 m (New Guinea) or 1600 m (Maluku).

It is generally uncommon due to habitat loss and capture for the parrot trade, but remains locally common at least on the Sula Islands, Halmahera, and Buru. Overall, the species is not believed to be in immediate danger, and consequently is listed as least concern by BirdLife International and IUCN. As most parrots, the Moluccan king parrot is listed in Appendix II of CITES.

== Aviculture ==
Until recently, only the subspecies A. a. amboinensis and A. a. hypophonius were regularly seen in aviculture, but A. a. buruensis and A. a. dorsalis are now also present, at least in zoos. It has regularly been bred in captivity, for example in Denmark.
