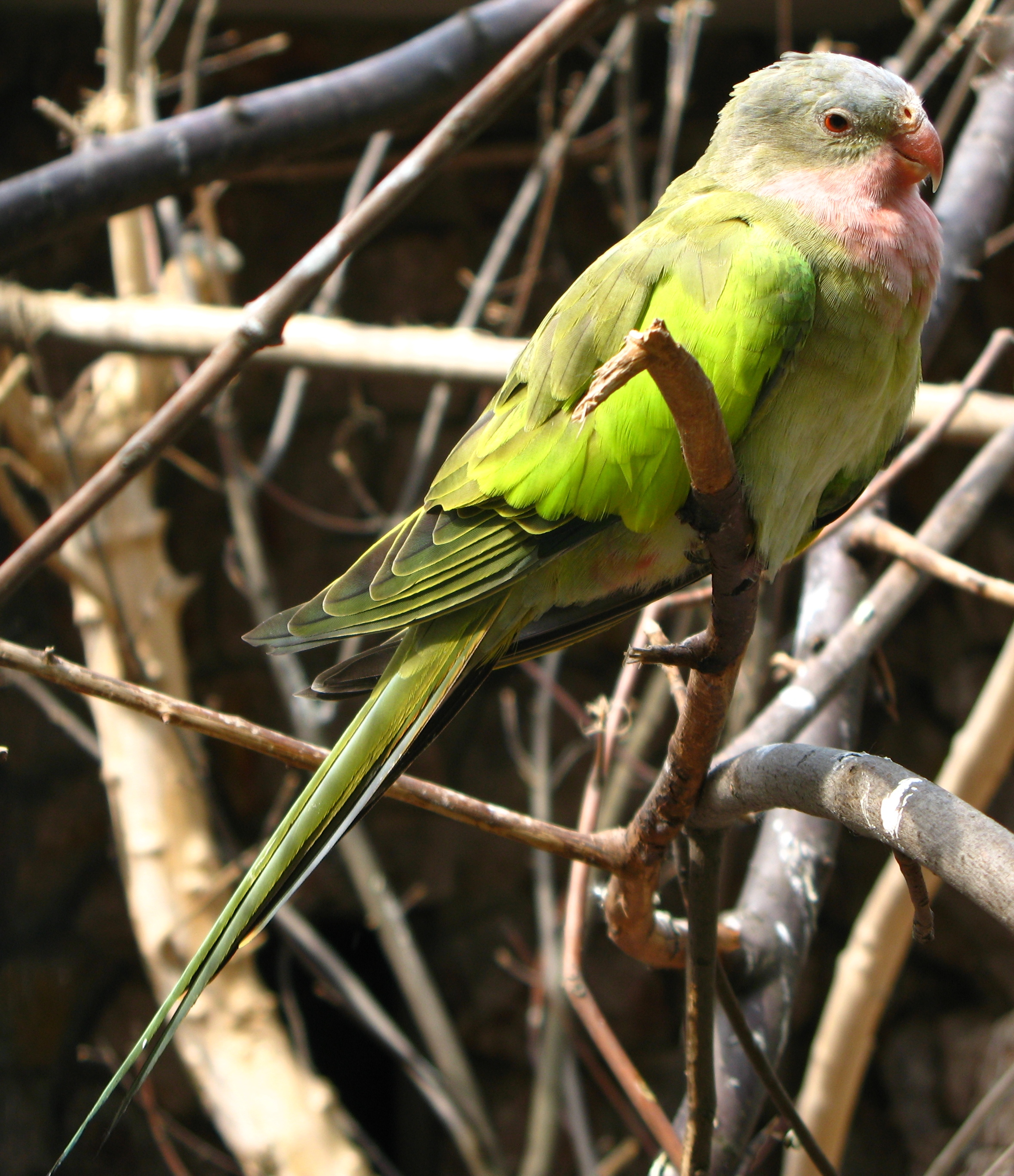
- At Warsaw Zoo

Conservation status
- Near Threatened (IUCN 3.1)

Scientific classification
- Kingdom: Animalia
- Phylum: Chordata
- Class: Aves
- Order: Psittaciformes
- Family: Psittaculidae
- Genus: Polytelis
- Species: P. alexandrae

Binomial name
- Polytelis alexandrae Gould, 1863

= Princess parrot =

Species of bird

The colourful princess parrot (Polytelis alexandrae) is an Australian bird of the parrot family. Its name was given in honour of Princess Alexandra of Denmark, who in 1863 married the Prince of Wales Edward VII and eventually became Queen of the United Kingdom. Other names for the species include: Queen Alexandra parrot (or parakeet), Alexandra's parakeet, Princess of Wales parakeet, rose-throated parakeet, and spinifex parrot. Their plumage is mostly green with a pink throat, bluish crown and rump, and bright green shoulders.

== Description ==
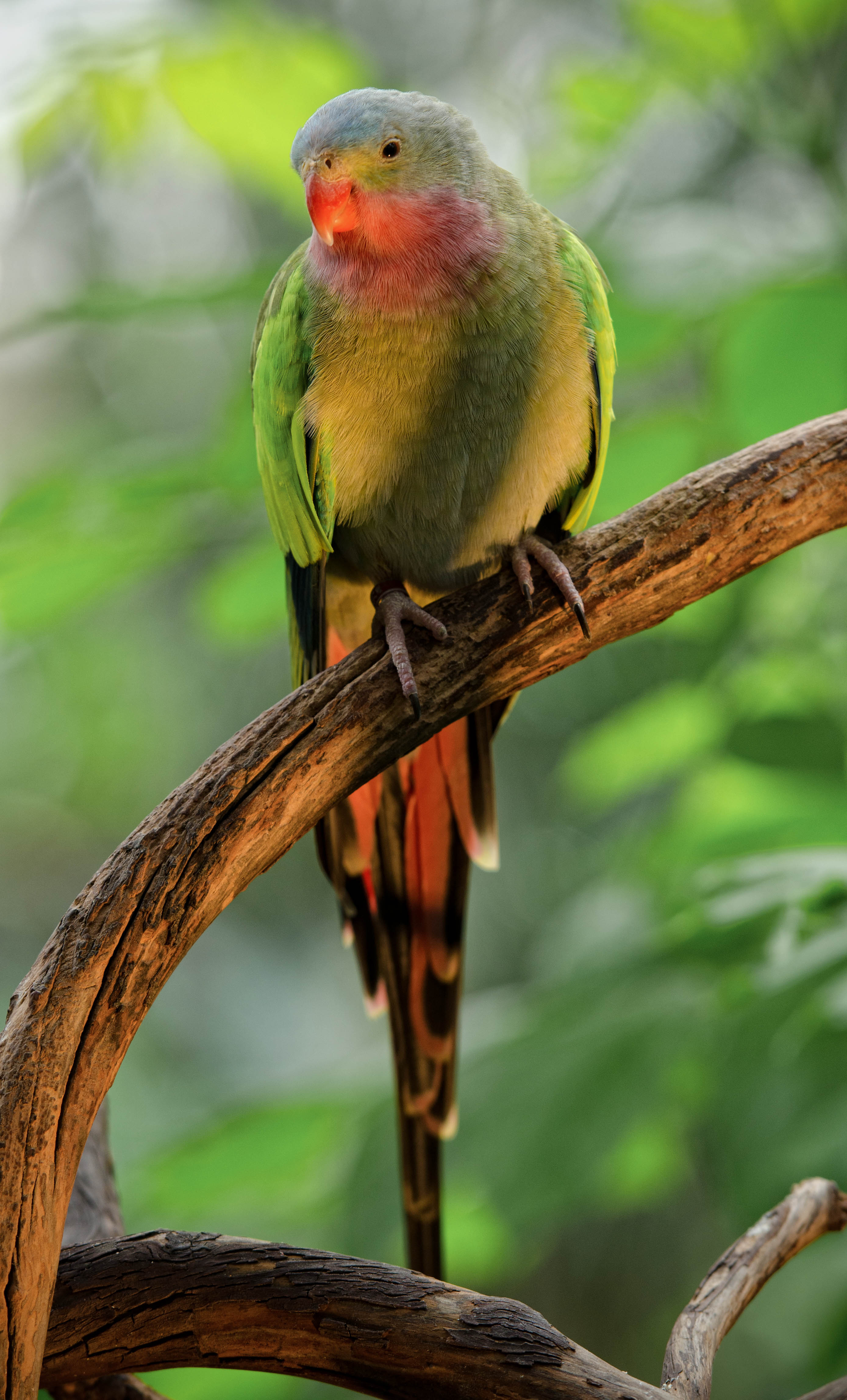
A male ("Monty") at Bloedel Conservatory, Vancouver, Canada

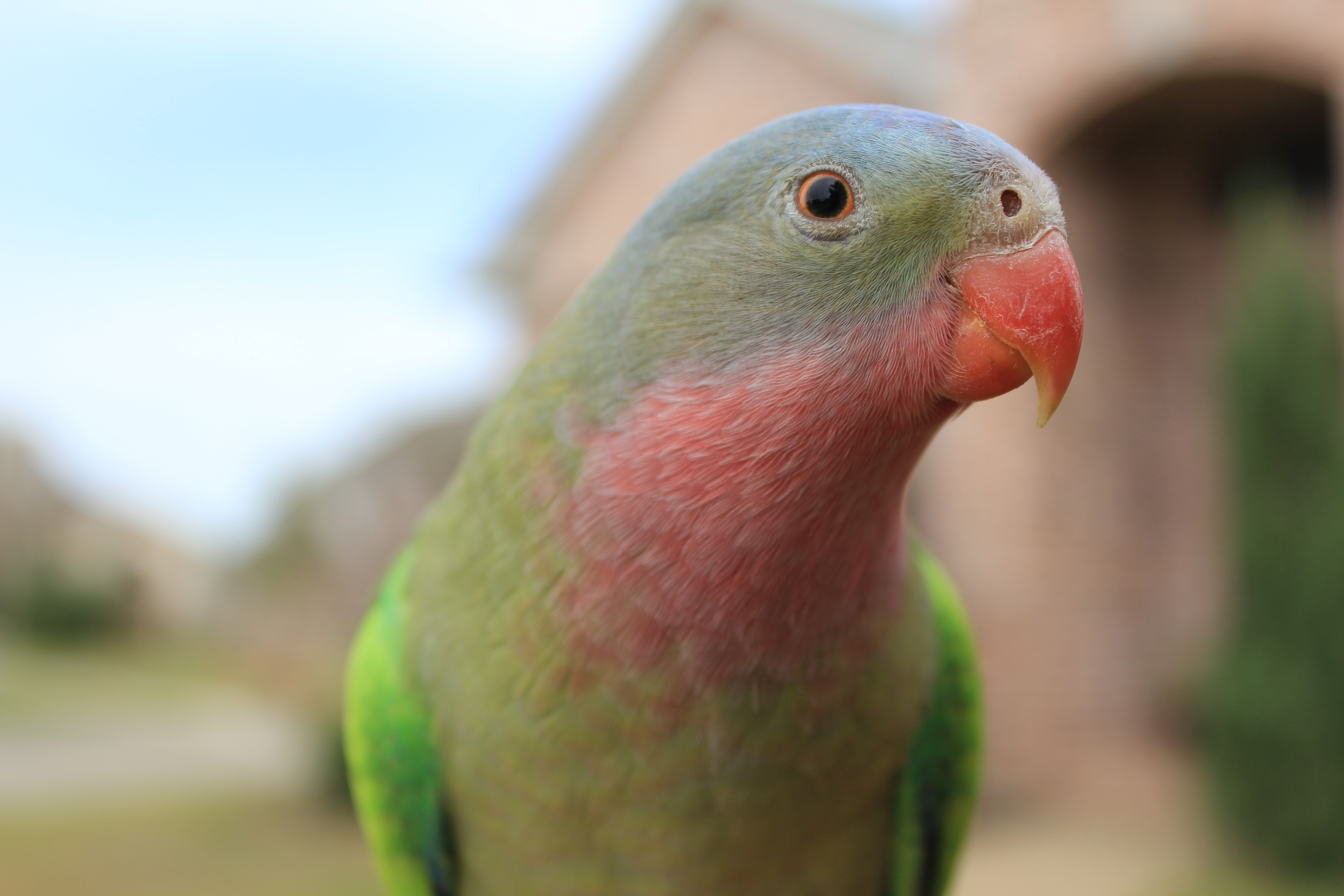
A male Princess parrot.

The princess parrot is a medium-sized parrot, 34 to 46 cm long and weighing between 110 and 120 g. The plumage is mostly green with a pink throat, bluish crown, and bright green shoulders. The rump is blue and the tail is long and narrow. The males have longer tail feathers and brighter coloring than females. The male also has a coral-red beak, while the female's is duller and has a greyish crown. Another difference is that the male has an orange iris, while the female's is much browner. In addition, the male of the species has a longer, projecting extension from the end of the 3rd primary (flight) feather on each side. This projection is called a 'spatula' or 'spatule' and appears in mature male birds.

== Behaviour ==
This species is nomadic, arriving in small groups to breed and then disappearing. It is one of Australia's least known parrots because it is so elusive, even though it is spread across the interior of Australia. It inhabits arid woodland and scrub with spinifex, eucalypts, acacias, etc. They are unusual among parrots in engaging in mobbing behaviour against predators. They feed on the seeds of grasses and shrubs.

=== Breeding ===
Four to six white eggs are laid which are incubated for 19 days. The chicks leave the nest about 35 days after hatching. These parakeets are truly opportunistic breeders, with pairs choosing to nest when food is plentiful. They nest in a hollow in an eucalypt or desert oak.

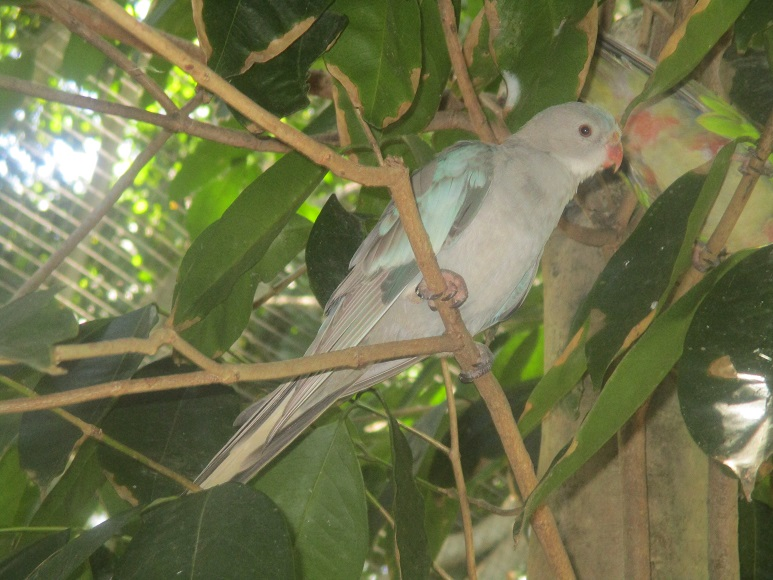
Blue winged mutant Princess Parrot

== Agriculture ==
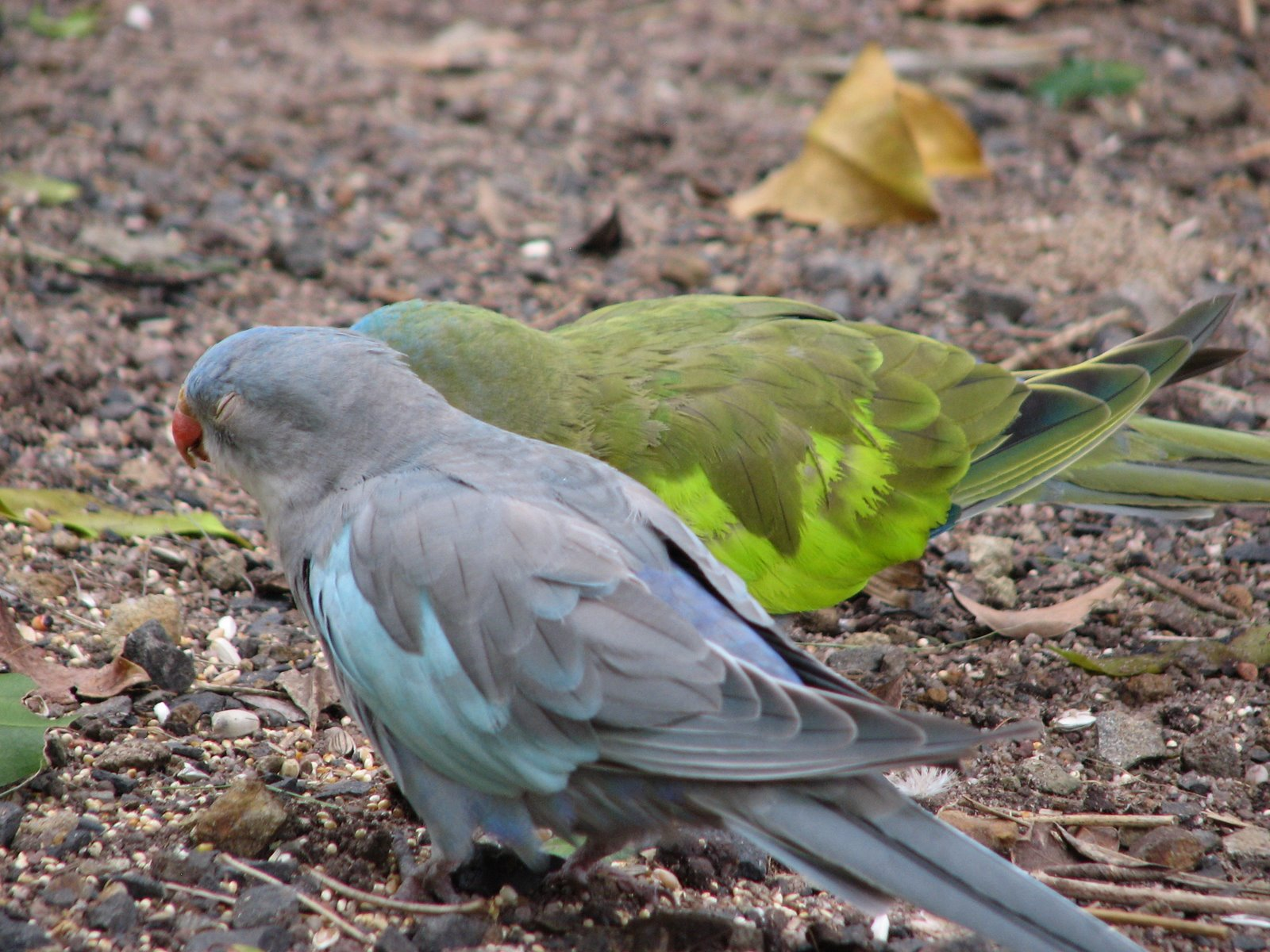
A blue mutant variety in front of a normal wild type at Flying High Bird Habitat, Australia

The princess parrot can make loud calls. Their life span is thought to be as long as 30 years. Under the right circumstances, they are able to bond to more than one member of the host family. These birds have a short range of mimicking ability, yet some have the ability to "talk". They are a favourite among many aviculturists and pet owners because of their looks and personality. Their diet consists of reasonable sized seeds and grasses that have seeds. They can be constipated if given bread or seeds that are small or become wet, they can become ill if seed bowls are contaminated by rats or mice so are best fed on an inverted ceramic pot with the bowl on top not wider than the top as they will dislodge the feed bowl.

There are three common color mutations of this parakeet. These colours are Lutino, Blue, and Albino (combination of Blue and Lutino). The natural, or 'normal' color is green. There are two types of blue, one blue winged and the second is bright blue wings and bright blue head.

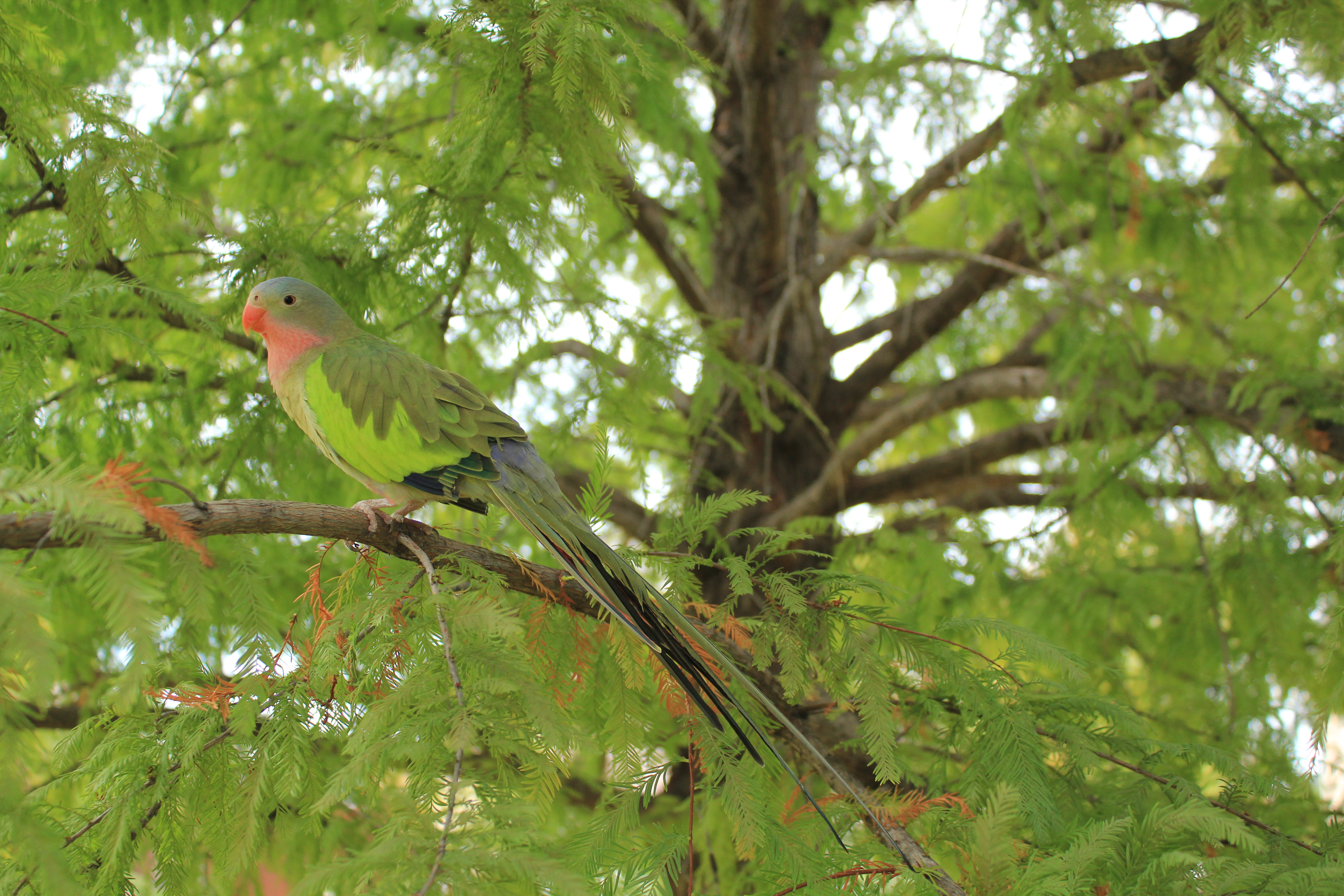
A male princess parrot perched on a branch.
