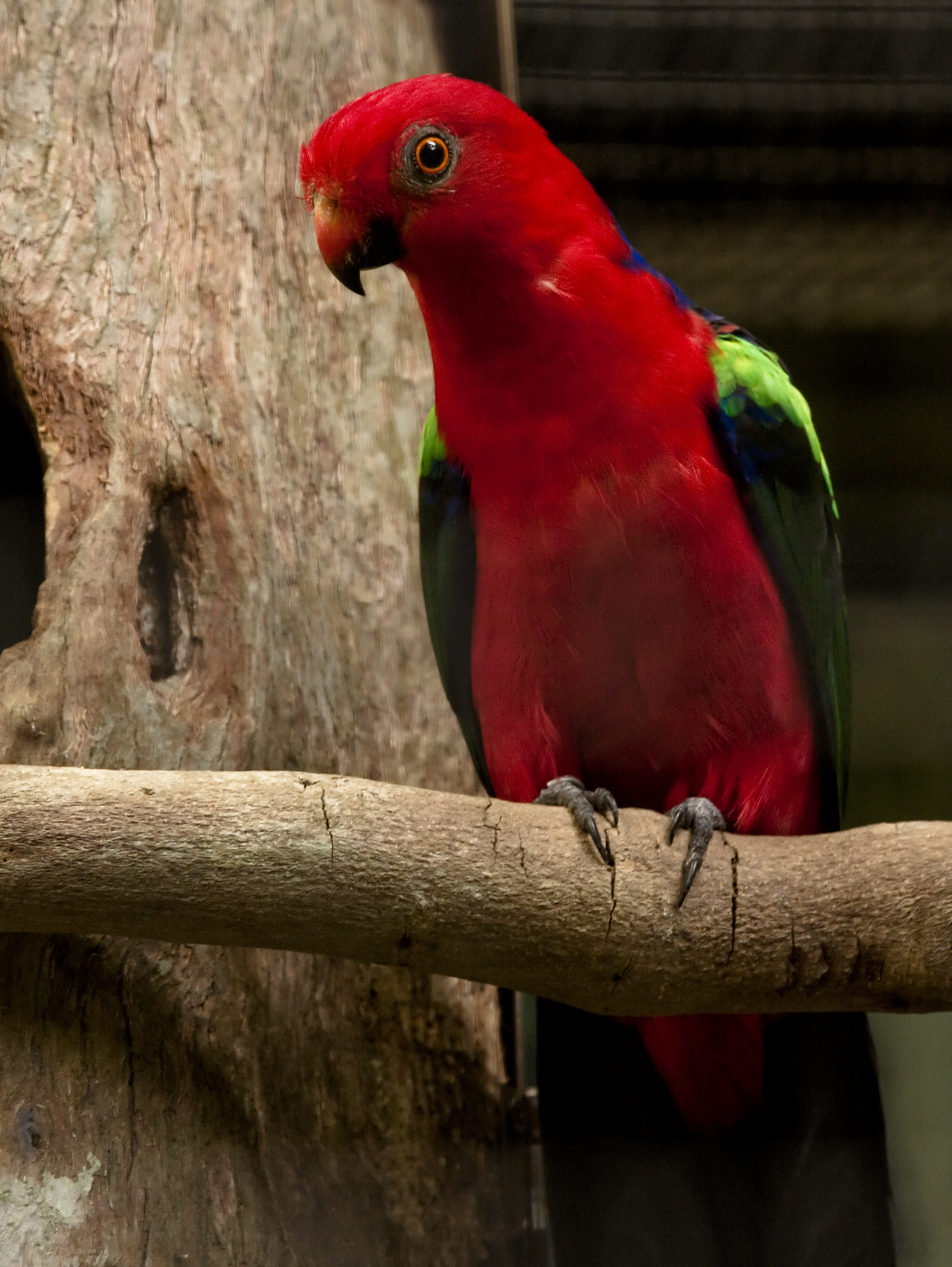
- Male at Jurong Bird Park

Conservation status
- Least Concern (IUCN 3.1)

Scientific classification
- Kingdom: Animalia
- Phylum: Chordata
- Class: Aves
- Order: Psittaciformes
- Family: Psittaculidae
- Genus: Alisterus
- Species: A. chloropterus

Binomial name
- Alisterus chloropterus (Ramsay, 1879)

= Papuan king parrot =

Species of bird

The Papuan king parrot (Alisterus chloropterus), also known as the green-winged king parrot, is a species of parrot in the family Psittaculidae found in New Guinea. Its natural habitats are subtropical or tropical moist lowland forest and subtropical or tropical moist montane forest.

== Taxonomy ==
First described by Australian ornithologist Edward Pierson Ramsay in 1879, the Papuan king parrot is one of three species known as king parrots found in Australia, Papua New Guinea, and West Papua/Indonesia. Three subspecies are recognized:

- A. chloropterus (Ramsay, EP 1879)
  - A. c. callopterus (Albertis & Salvadori 1879) is found in the Central Highlands west to the Weyland Mountains, the Sepik River area and upper Fly River.
  - A. c. chloropterus (Ramsay, EP 1879), the nominate subspecies, occurs in eastern New Guinea to the Huon Peninsula in the north, and Hall Sound in the south.
  - A. c. moszkowskii (Reichenow 1911) is found in the north of the island, from Cenderawasih Bay east to the Aitape region.

== Description ==
The Papuan king parrot is 36 cm (14 in) long including a long, broad tail. It has dark grey legs and orange irises. The three subspecies of the Papuan king parrot all show sexual dimorphism and in all three subspecies the male can be identified by a prominent broad pale-green band on each wing (resembling a shoulder stripe). The differences in the females between subspecies are more marked than the differences in the males.

The male has a red head and neck, red lower parts, blue back and rump, green wings each with a broad band of pale-green. In the male of A. c. chloropterus the blue extents upwards from the back to the hind neck. In the female of the A. c. chloropterus and A. c. calloterus the abdomen is red, the green over the head and neck is continuous with green of the back and wings, and the chest has vague transverse green and red striations. The female of subspecies A. c. moszkowskii has a red head, neck, chest, and lower abdomen resembling the male, and differs from the male with its much smaller pale-green wing band.

== Distribution and habitat ==
Found on in central and eastern New Guinea east of the Weyland Mountains, it lives in forests up to an altitude of 2600 m.

== Behaviour ==
Birds are encountered in ones or twos, or in small flocks up to 10 birds. They feed quietly in dense forest generally in small trees or low branches of large trees, and are often unnoticed. They eat berries, fruit, seeds and possibly some insects.
