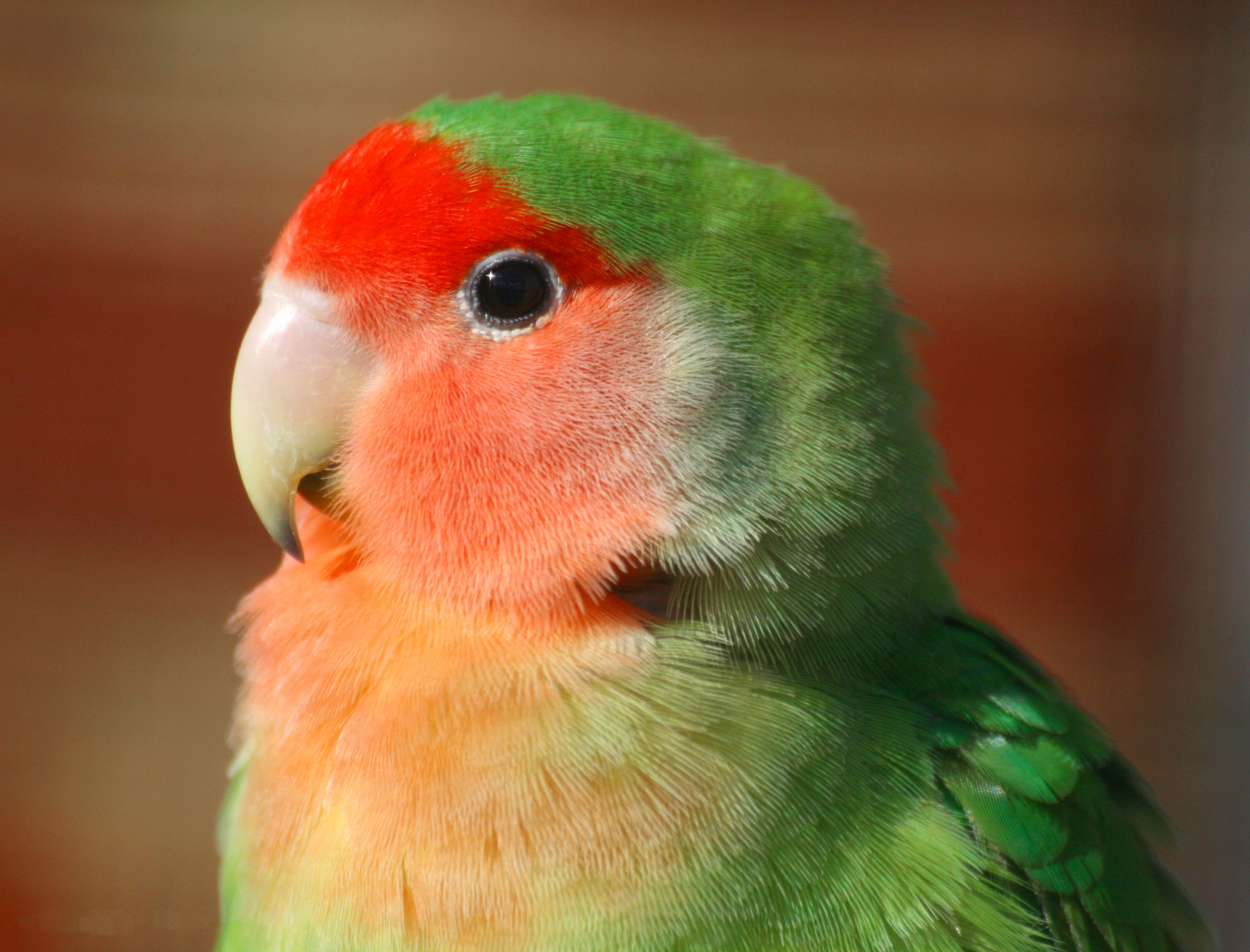
- Agapornis roseicollis

Scientific classification
- Kingdom: Animalia
- Phylum: Chordata
- Class: Aves
- Order: Psittaciformes
- Family: Psittaculidae
- Subfamily: Agapornithinae; Salvin, 1882

Genera
- Agapornis; Bolbopsittacus; Loriculus

= Agapornithinae =

Subfamily of birds

Agapornithinae is a subfamily of psittacine birds, one of the five subfamilies that make up the family Psittaculidae. Its members are small, short-tailed parrots that inhabit Africa and Asia. They usually have predominantly green plumage and present different colorations on the head.

== Genera ==
The subfamily contains 3 genera:

- Genus Agapornis
  - Agapornis canus – grey-headed lovebird
  - Agapornis fischeri – Fischer's lovebird
  - Agapornis lilianae – Lilian's lovebird
  - Agapornis nigrigenis – black-cheeked lovebird
  - Agapornis personatus – yellow-collared lovebird
  - Agapornis pullarius – red-headed lovebird
  - Agapornis roseicollis – rosy-faced lovebird
  - Agapornis swindernianus – black-collared lovebird
  - Agapornis taranta – black-winged lovebird
- Genus Bolbopsittacus
  - Bolbopsittacus lunulatus – guaiabero
- Genus Loriculus
  - Loriculus amabilis – Moluccan hanging parrot
  - Loriculus aurantiifrons – orange-fronted hanging parrot
  - Loriculus beryllinus – Sri Lanka hanging parrot
  - Loriculus camiguinensis – Camiguin hanging parrot (sometimes considered a subgenus of L. philippensis)
  - Loriculus catamene – Sangihe hanging parrot
  - Loriculus exilis – pygmy hanging parrot or green hanging parrot
  - Loriculus flosculus – Wallace's hanging parrot
  - Loriculus galgulus – blue-crowned hanging parrot
  - Loriculus philippensis – Philippine hanging parrot or Colasisi
  - Loriculus bonapartei – black-billed hanging parrot
  - Loriculus pusillus – yellow-throated hanging parrot
  - Loriculus sclateri – Sula hanging parrot
  - Loriculus stigmatus – great hanging parrot or Celebes hanging parrot
  - Loriculus tener – Bismarck hanging parrot or green-fronted hanging parrot
  - Loriculus vernalis – vernal hanging parrot
