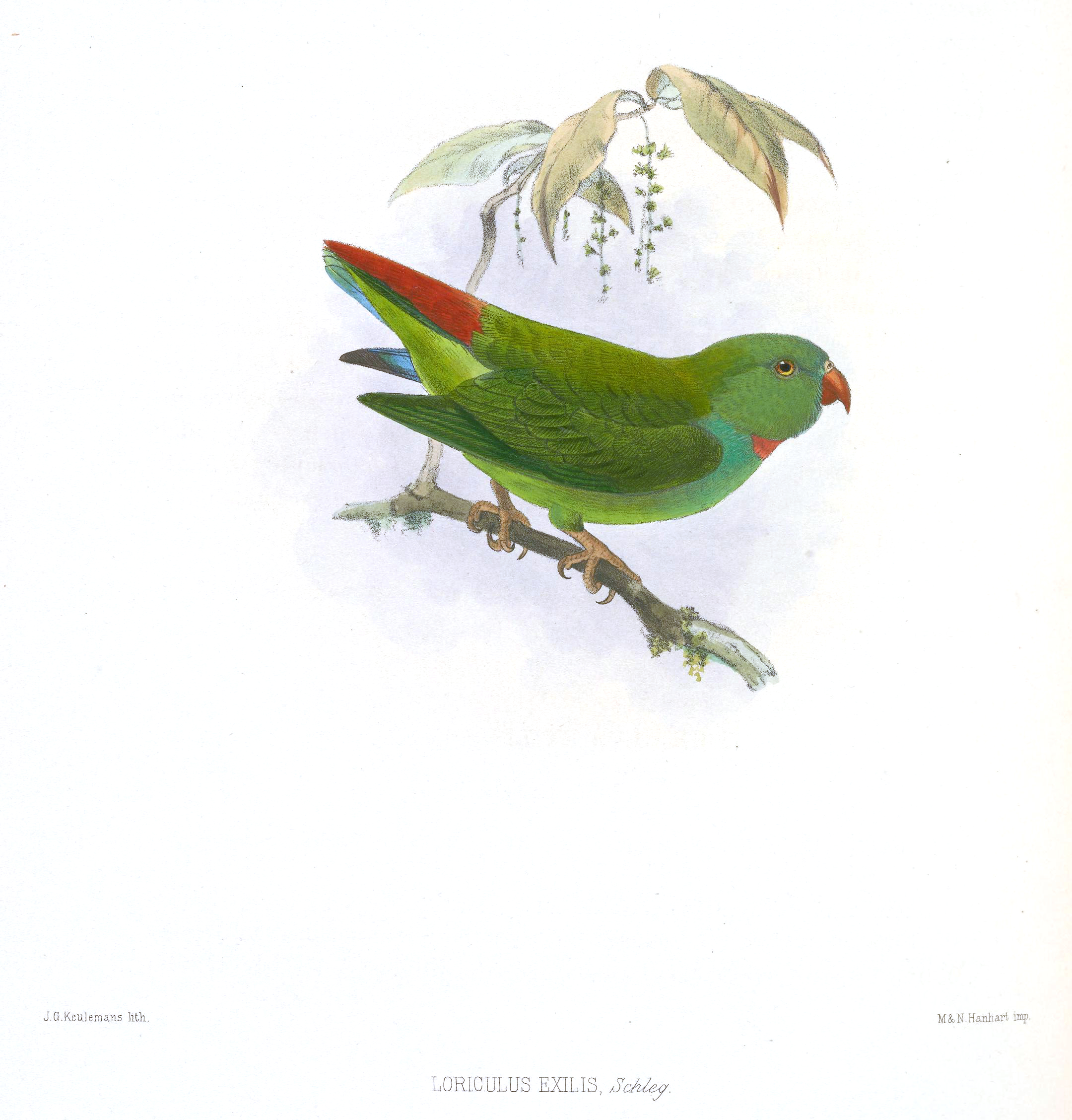

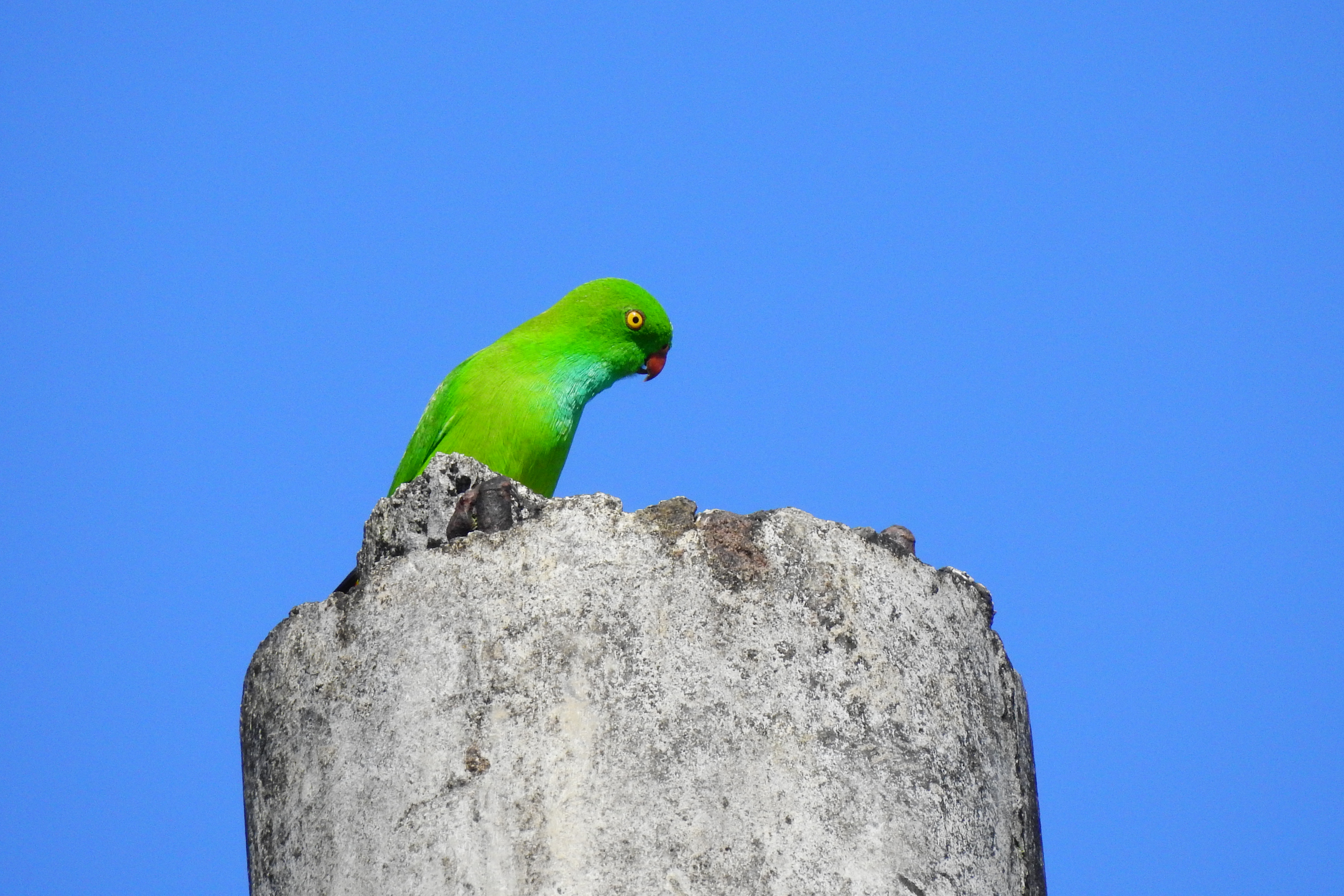

Conservation status
- Least Concern (IUCN 3.1)

Scientific classification
- Kingdom: Animalia
- Phylum: Chordata
- Class: Aves
- Order: Psittaciformes
- Family: Psittaculidae
- Genus: Loriculus
- Species: L. exilis

Binomial name
- Loriculus exilis Schlegel, 1866

= Pygmy hanging parrot =

Species of bird

Pygmy Hanging-Parrot

The pygmy hanging parrot, red-billed hanging parrot or green hanging parrot (Loriculus exilis) is a species of parrot in the family Psittaculidae and is one of the smallest members of its genus. It is distinctive by its small size, orange bill and bright green plumage with a red throat. The bird is green all over. Its face consists of an orange bill and red throat. The tail is red. It is sometimes confused with the great hanging parrot due to their similar color but the pygmy hanging parrot is smaller and has a more red bill, green forehead, and uniform green mantle. It is endemic to forest, mangrove and other wooded habitats on the Indonesian island called Sulawesi.

== Taxonomy ==
The pygmy hanging parrot (Loriculus exilis) belongs to the order Psittaciformes which contains parrots, macaws, cockatoos and lories. It belongs to the family Psittaculidae which contains five subfamilies which span the Old World: Loriinae, Agapornithinae, Platycercinae, Psittacellinae and Psittaculinae. Loriculus exilis is placed in the subfamily Psittaculinae, which include Polytelini, Psittaculini, and Micropsittini (pygmy parrots). Micropsittini is a tribe of birds phylogenetically sister to Polytelini/Psittaculini and has a deep stem age of 27.6 million years ago. The species tree within this tribe is changing regularly due to the small number and quality of genomic samples currently available.

Hanging parrots are a part of the genus Loriculus, which was historically placed within Loriinae, but more recent phylogenetic analyses have revised this classification, suggesting they are different subfamilies who experienced convergent evolution. Note that the name "pygmy hanging parrot" may be deceiving because pygmy parrots are classified within the genus Micropsitta, but this species is only called pygmy for its small size.

This species is monotypic, meaning no subspecies are recognized. However, they form a species group with Loriculus pusillus and Loriculus flosculus, which all used to be grouped together as one species.

== Description and Identification ==
Parrots are generally defined by their bright colors, large hooked rostrum (upper beak), prominent cere (a featherless area dorsal to the upper beak), and relatively short tails.

Pygmy parrots are small, typically weighing around 11 grams. Loriculus exilis is one of the smallest members of its genus, measuring 10–11 cm in length. Its plumage is mostly bright green with a slight tinge of yellow on its underparts. It has a bright red or orange beak, orange legs and a thin red mark on the throat bordered with a royal blue collar. Its upper side rump also has red feathers. The red throat patch can be a good indicator to further distinguish an individual: females have a reduced patch and even sometimes lack it completely, similarly to immature birds who do not have it at all. Immature individuals also have yellower legs then adults. In order to better climb and forage on tree trunks, they have evolved modified tail shafts stronger than average and long claws.

Loriculus exilis can often be confused with other species, however it can be distinguished from other pygmy parrots by its brighter plumage, and from other hanging parrots by its smaller size. Its home range can also be very helpful in differentiating it from others due to its restricted habitat on Sulawesi and nearby islands.

Vocalizations of the pygmy hanging parrot are described as short, high-pitched, insect-like notes. Recorded calls are often in sequences of two to four "tsi-tsi-tsik" sounds.

== Distribution and habitat ==
Loriculus exilis is mainly endemic to Sulawesi island in Indonesia, but can also be found on many small surrounding islands such as Buton, Kabaena, and Wawonii. Although previously thought to occur only in preserved, or primary lowland forest, the species has shown some tolerance to habitat degradation. This said, it inhabits a wide range of forested areas; primary and secondary lowland and hill forests, as well as mangroves and forest edge habitats. It has been said to fly or perch anywhere from sea level up to 1,000 meters, but recent records extend its elevation range to 1,320 m in the Mekongga Mountains. Its extent of occurrence, or total geographic range is estimated at 414,000 km². Since they are non-migratory, their geographic range is not expected to change in the next years.

== Behaviour and ecology ==
The habits of pygmy parrots are generally poorly known due to their small habitat range and small size making them difficult to survey. The species is generally inconspicuous, moving quietly and swiftly through the forest canopy. Observers have reported that they seem to be in a frenzy most of the time, hopping rather than walking and keeping their legs constantly crouched rather than standing straight like most other parrots.

=== Migration ===
Loriculus exilis is non-migratory, but may be nomadic, following the flowering and fruiting of trees. Observations from Northern Sulawesi in the 19th century reported flocks appearing suddenly after periods of absence, possibly linked to food availability. This said, the pygmy hanging parrot is usually found singly or in pairs. They are most active after sunrise, often delaying foraging in overcast conditions—suggests finely balanced energy budgets typical of very small birds.

=== Breeding ===
The pygmy hanging parrot has an average generation length of 3.8 years, meaning it takes ~3.8 years for an offspring to mature and have babies of its own. Breeding occurs in February and August. The clutch size is unknown, but eggs measured in captivity are approximately 19 × 15 mm.

Nests are mostly made in holes in dead palms and stumps, but can occasionally be in arboreal termitaria (termite nests in trees), just like other species such as the buff-faced pygmy parrot (Micropsitta pusio). Cavities are used for both nesting and roosting.

Their breeding is endemic and has 10 identified Important Bird and Biodiversity Areas (IBAs) or Key Biodiversity Areas (KBAs), which meet international criteria for sites that are essential for maintaining bird populations.

=== Food and feeding ===
Observations have concluded that pygmy parrots like to feed on lichen and fungus, and stomach content analyses have expanded on this with evidence of seeds, flowers, and insects consumption. Surveys on Loriculus exilis have suggested that its diet varies from the norm a little by mainly eating figs, nectar and blossoms.

In terms of their evolution, their stiffened tails are a result of mainly feeding on tree bark, and their strong feet/claws allow them to cling to vertical tree trunks and hang upside down while foraging.

== Cultural importance ==
Many parrots are kept in captivity as pets, but due to its rarity, small size and specialized diet, Loriculus exilis along with other pygmy parrots are not. Their dependence on a diet rich of lichens and fungi is difficult to replicate in captivity.

The bird trade in Indonesia is deep-rooted in their culture for traditions regarding bird calls and beauty as pets to specialized cuisines. This has resulted in a lucrative, thriving market with vast networks. There is currently limited trapping of the pygmy hanging parrot, but there are no quotas on it currently, meaning that this data could change or be unreported.

== Threats and survival ==
The population trends for Loriculus exilis are generally unknown, but suspected to be decreasing due to habitat loss from deforestation and trapping for the bird trade. Trapping for the pet trade is a big threat for Indonesian birds, but unfortunately has few field studies to properly gauge how serious that threat is. This is a pressing matter to make sense of as wildlife hunting and trade networks extend all of the provinces of Sulawesi, and is undergoing rapid exploitation. Over 2,100 individuals were reported in trade records from Indonesia in 1991, though no quotas were set in subsequent years. Despite these pressures, its ability to persist in disturbed habitats may buffer it against rapid decline. As well, since pygmy hanging parrots mainly stay in remote, high-elevation forests that are hardly accessible by humans, it is luckily unlikely that their rates of decline will exceed 20% in the next three generations (~12 years).

== Conservation status and future implications ==
According to the IUCN Red List, the pygmy hanging parrot is classified as Least Concern. Since the species rates of decline are unlikely to exceed the 30% threshold in three generations, and it has a large unfragmented habitat range exceeding 20,000 km², it does not meet the criteria for Vulnerable.

However, Loriculus exilis has a suspected decreasing population trend due to habitat degradation and trapping. Newer data shows that Sulawesi, Buton and Kabaena Islands’ forests are becoming increasingly fragmented, which may cause important stressors in this birds population growth over time.

The species is listed under Appendix II of CITES (Convention on International Trade in Endangered Species) meaning they are not in imminent danger but may be at risk of becoming so if its international trade is not strictly regulated.

Due to their crypticity, rarity and small size, many population variables remain unknown, such as number of mature individuals versus reared young and number of subpopulations. Thus, conservation actions proposed include population surveys, monitoring at key sites, protection of primary lowland forest, and the use of remote sensing to track habitat loss. This can help update Loriculus exilis' conservation status, and increase local legislation and awareness programs.

In captivity, due to their high energetic lifestyle and specific dietary needs, they were found to refuse to eat food and hum themselves out within hours.
