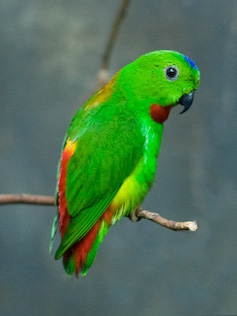
- Blue-crowned hanging parrot

Scientific classification
- Kingdom: Animalia
- Phylum: Chordata
- Class: Aves
- Order: Psittaciformes
- Family: Psittaculidae
- Subfamily: Agapornithinae
- Genus: Loriculus; Blyth, 1849

Type species
- Psittacus galgulus (blue-crowned hanging parrot) Linnaeus, 1758

Species
- See main text

= Hanging parrot =

Hanging parrots

Genus of birds

Hanging parrots are birds in the genus Loriculus, a group of small parrots from tropical southern Asia.

About 13 cm (5.1 in) long, hanging parrots are mostly green plumaged and short-tailed. Often head coloring helps to identify individual species. They are unique among birds for their ability to sleep upside down.

== Taxonomy ==
The genus Loriculus was introduced in 1849 by the English zoologist Edward Blyth for the blue-crowned hanging parrot. The name is a diminutive of the genus Lorius that was introduced by Nicholas Aylward Vigors for the lorys in 1825.

Fifteen species are recognised:

Genus Loriculus – Blyth, 1849 – Fifteen species
Common name	Scientific name and subspecies	Range	Size and ecology	IUCN status and estimated population
Vernal hanging parrot	Loriculus vernalis (Sparrman, 1787)	Indian subcontinent and some other areas of Southeast Asia.	Size: Habitat: Diet:	LC
Sri Lanka hanging parrot	Loriculus beryllinus (Pennant, 1781)	Sri Lanka.	Size: Habitat: Diet:	LC
Philippine hanging parrot	Loriculus philippensis (P.L.S. Müller, 1776)	the Philippines.	Size: Habitat: Diet:	LC
Black-billed hanging parrot	Loriculus bonapartei (Souancé, 1856)	the Sulu Archipelago of the Philippines	Size: Habitat: Diet:	LC
Camiguin hanging parrot	Loriculus camiguinensis (Tello, Degner, Bates, JM & Willard, 2006)	the Philippine island of Camiguin	Size: Habitat: Diet:	
Blue-crowned hanging parrot	Loriculus galgulus (Linnaeus, 1758)	southern Burma and Thailand, Malaya, Singapore, and Indonesia (Sumatra, Java, Borneo).	Size: Habitat: Diet:	LC
Great hanging parrot, Celebes hanging parrot	Loriculus stigmatus (Müller, 1843)	Sulawesi	Size: Habitat: Diet:	LC
Moluccan hanging parrot	Loriculus amabilis (, )	New Guinea	Size: Habitat: Diet:	LC
Sula hanging parrot	Loriculus sclateri Wallace, 1862	Halmahera, Bacan and Morotai in Indonesia.	Size: Habitat: Diet:	LC
Sangihe hanging parrot	Loriculus catamene Wallace, 1863	Banggai and Sula Islands in Indonesia.	Size: Habitat: Diet:	LC
Orange-fronted hanging parrot	Loriculus aurantiifrons (, )		Size: Habitat: Diet:	LC
Bismarck hanging parrot	Loriculus tener Schlegel, 1871	Sangihe, north of Sulawesi, Indonesia.	Size: Habitat: Diet:	LC
Pygmy hanging parrot, green hanging parrot	Loriculus exilis Schlegel, 1871	New Guinea	Size: Habitat: Diet:	LC
Yellow-throated hanging parrot	Loriculus pusillus Gray, 1859	Indonesian islands of Java and Bali.	Size: Habitat: Diet:	LC
Wallace's hanging parrot	Loriculus flosculus Wallace, 1864	e island of Flores.	Size: Habitat: Diet:	VU

== Gallery ==
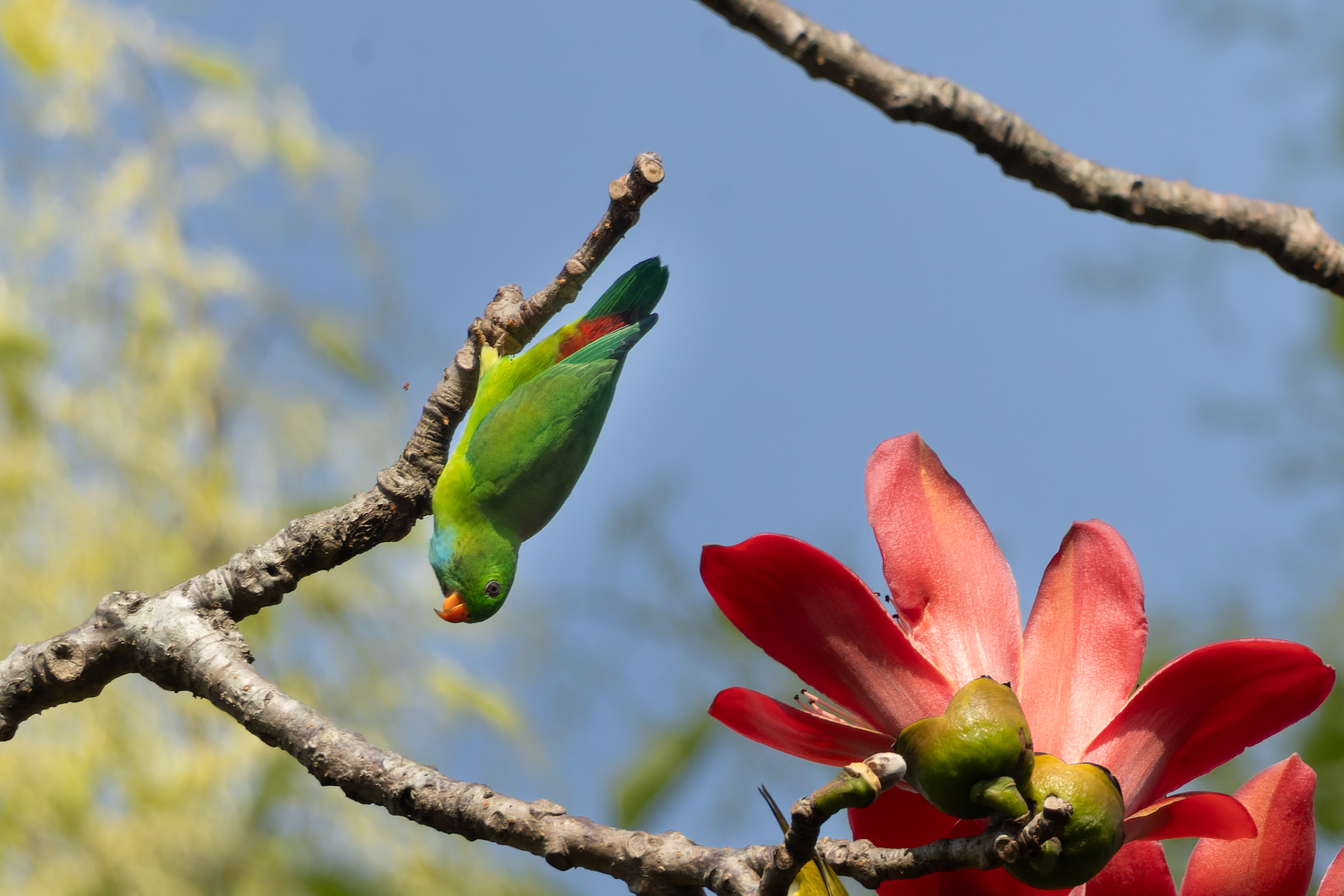
Vernal Hanging-Parrot

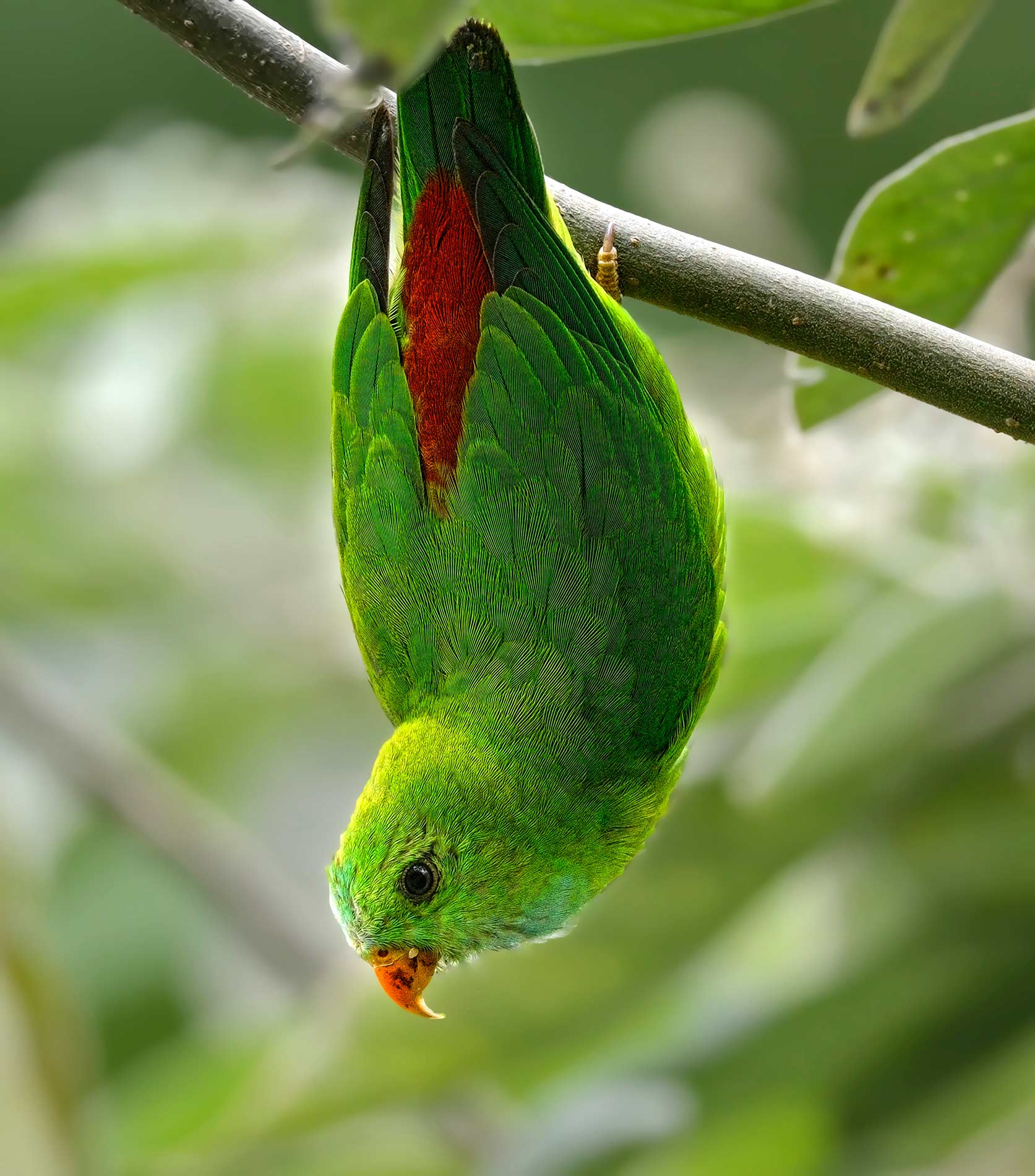
Vernal Hanging-Parrot

== See also ==
- Parrotlet
- Pygmy parrot
- Fig parrot
