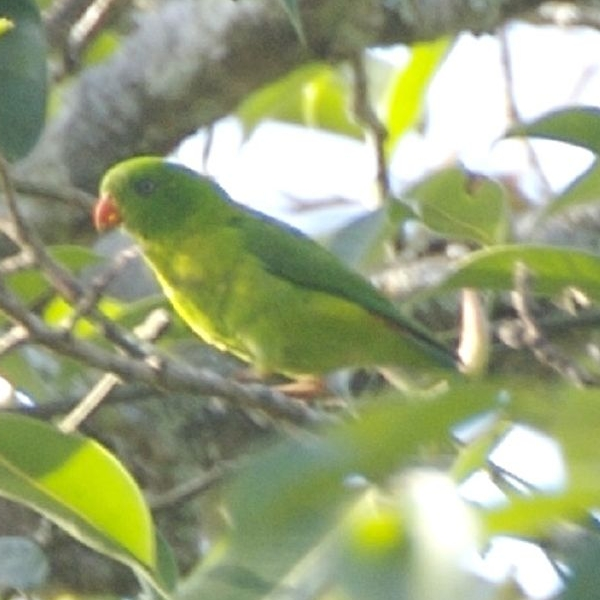

Conservation status
- Near Threatened (IUCN 3.1)

Scientific classification
- Kingdom: Animalia
- Phylum: Chordata
- Class: Aves
- Order: Psittaciformes
- Family: Psittaculidae
- Genus: Loriculus
- Species: L. pusillus

Binomial name
- Loriculus pusillus Gray, 1859

= Yellow-throated hanging parrot =

Species of bird

The yellow-throated hanging parrot (Loriculus pusillus) is a small species of parrot in the family Psittaculidae. It is endemic to the Indonesian islands of Java and Bali. It is found in forest and adjacent habitats. It is threatened by habitat loss.

== Description ==
The yellow-throated hanging parrot is small. Its body is green, with a yellow patch on the front of its neck. Its lower back is red.

== Diet ==
It primarily eats flowers, flower buds, and small fruits.

== Behavior ==
Yellow-throated hanging parrots often flock in large groups, both in flight and while perching on tree branches. They are known to vocalize loudly around mealtimes.
