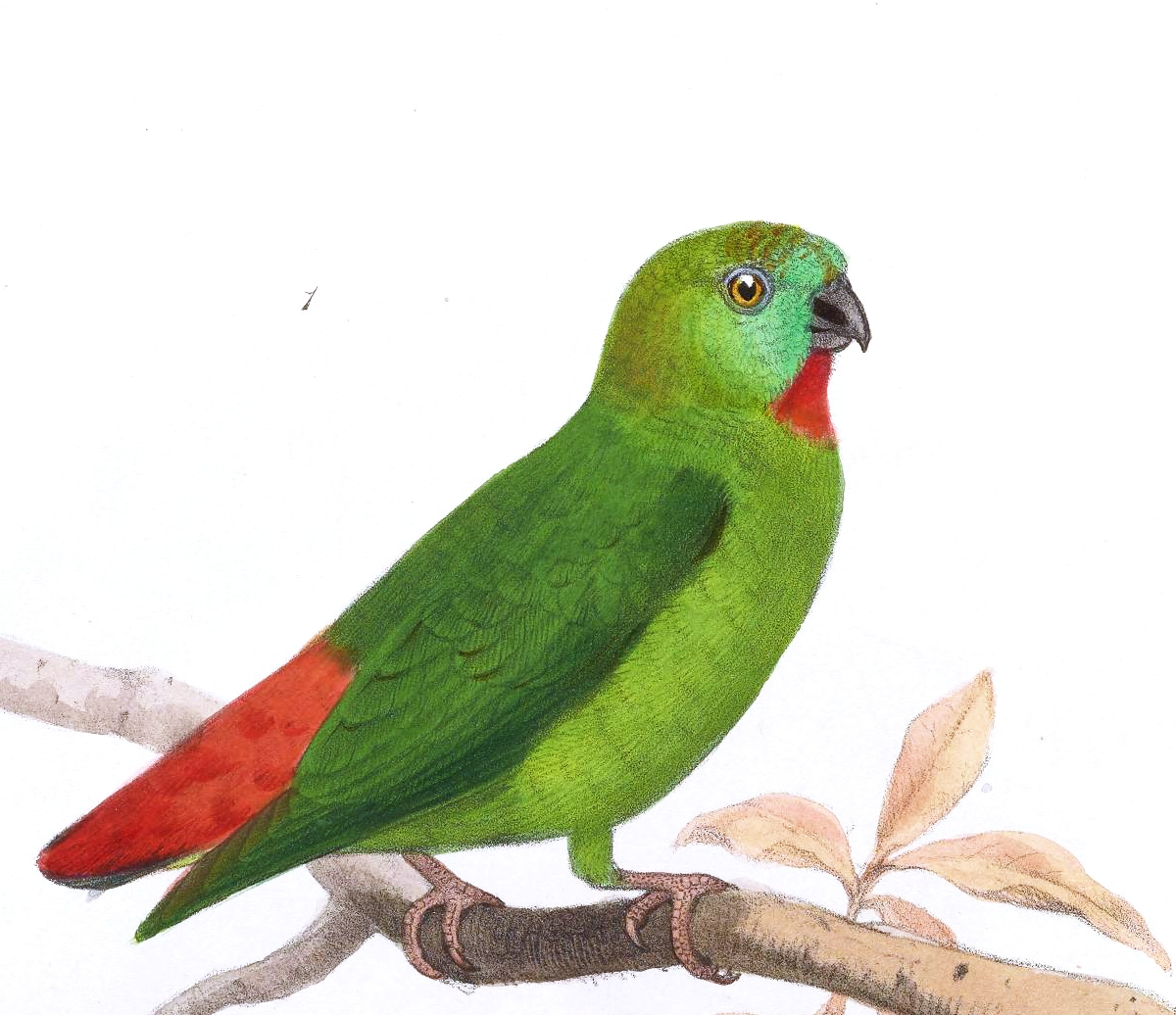
- Female
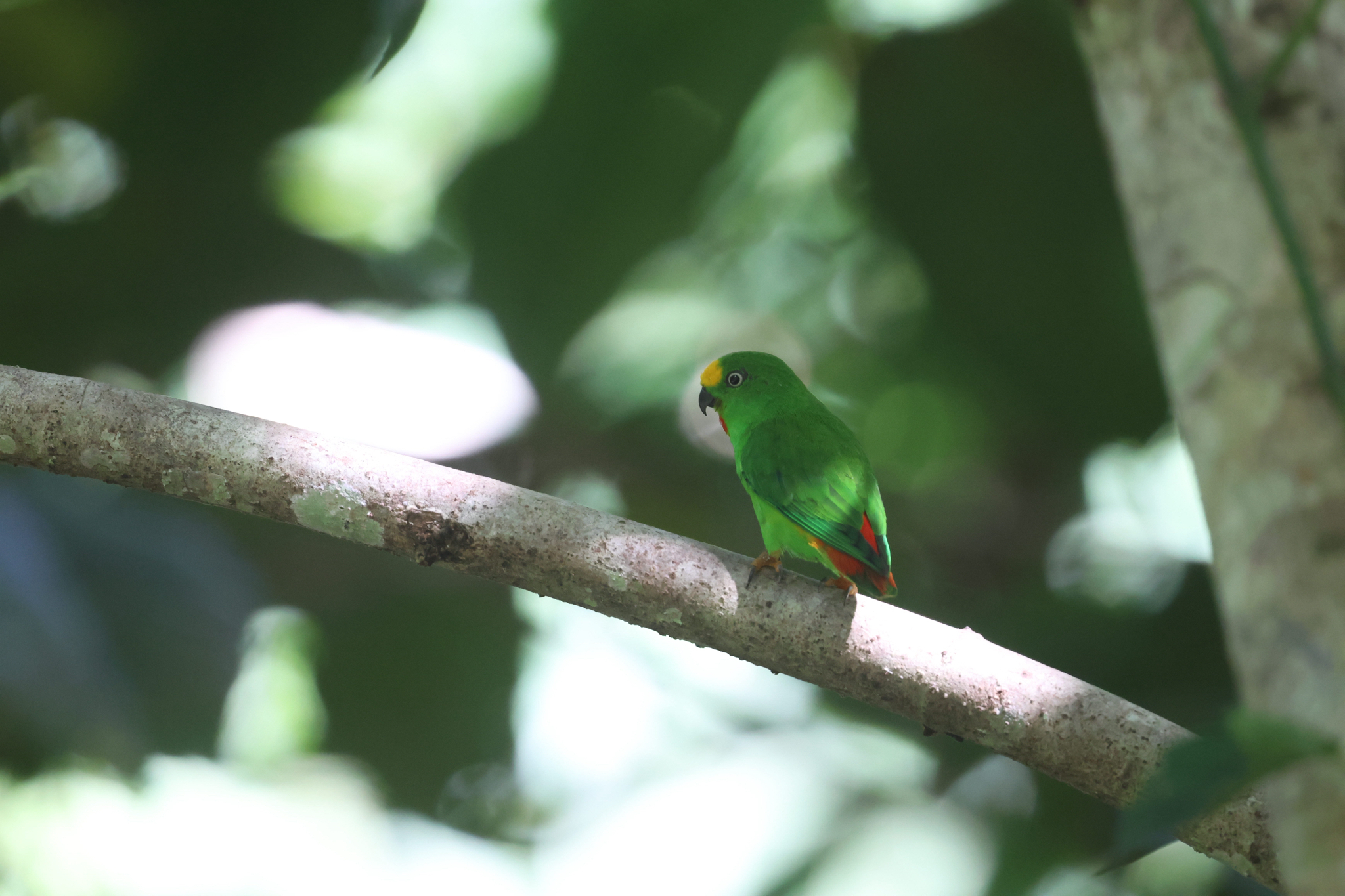

Conservation status
- Least Concern (IUCN 3.1)

Scientific classification
- Kingdom: Animalia
- Phylum: Chordata
- Class: Aves
- Order: Psittaciformes
- Family: Psittaculidae
- Genus: Loriculus
- Species: L. aurantiifrons

Binomial name
- Loriculus aurantiifrons Schlegel, 1871

= Orange-fronted hanging parrot =

Species of bird

The orange-fronted hanging parrot or Papuan hanging parrot (Loriculus aurantiifrons) is a small species of parrot in the family Psittaculidae. It is endemic to forest in New Guinea and adjacent smaller islands. It sometimes includes the Bismarck hanging parrot as a subspecies.

== Description ==
Individuals are 10 cm (4 in) and 14-16 g, and sexually dimorphic. Males and females are both mainly green in color, with males having a golden yellow forecrown, and females having a blue-green forecrown and blue-green cheeks. Both sexes have a red throat patch, red rump, and yellow on the sides of the rump.
