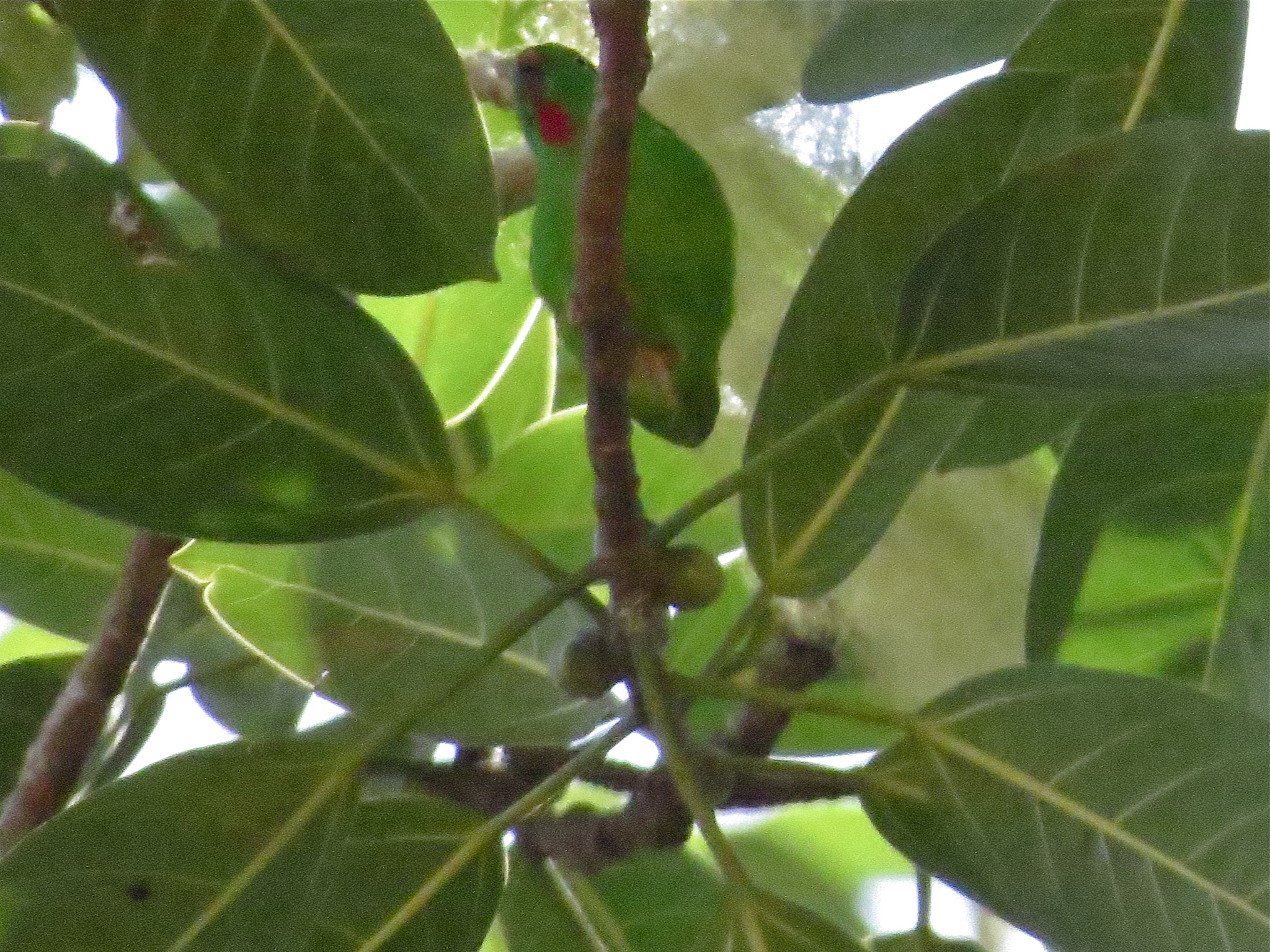

Conservation status
- Vulnerable (IUCN 3.1)

Scientific classification
- Kingdom: Animalia
- Phylum: Chordata
- Class: Aves
- Order: Psittaciformes
- Family: Psittaculidae
- Genus: Loriculus
- Species: L. flosculus

Binomial name
- Loriculus flosculus Wallace, 1864

= Wallace's hanging parrot =

Species of bird

Wallace's hanging parrot (Loriculus flosculus) also known as the Flores hanging parrot, is a small (length: 11–12 cm) parrot endemic to the island of Flores.

This is an arboreal parrot. The male is predominantly green, with a red bill, a red spot on the throat, orange legs and dark red nape, bright red rump and uppertail-coverts. The female has the red on the throat reduced or absent.

This parrot qualifies as Endangered as it has a very small range and population. The main threat is habitat destruction. The current population is estimated at between 2,500 and 10,000.

It is named after Alfred Russel Wallace, a British naturalist, explorer, geographer, and biologist.
