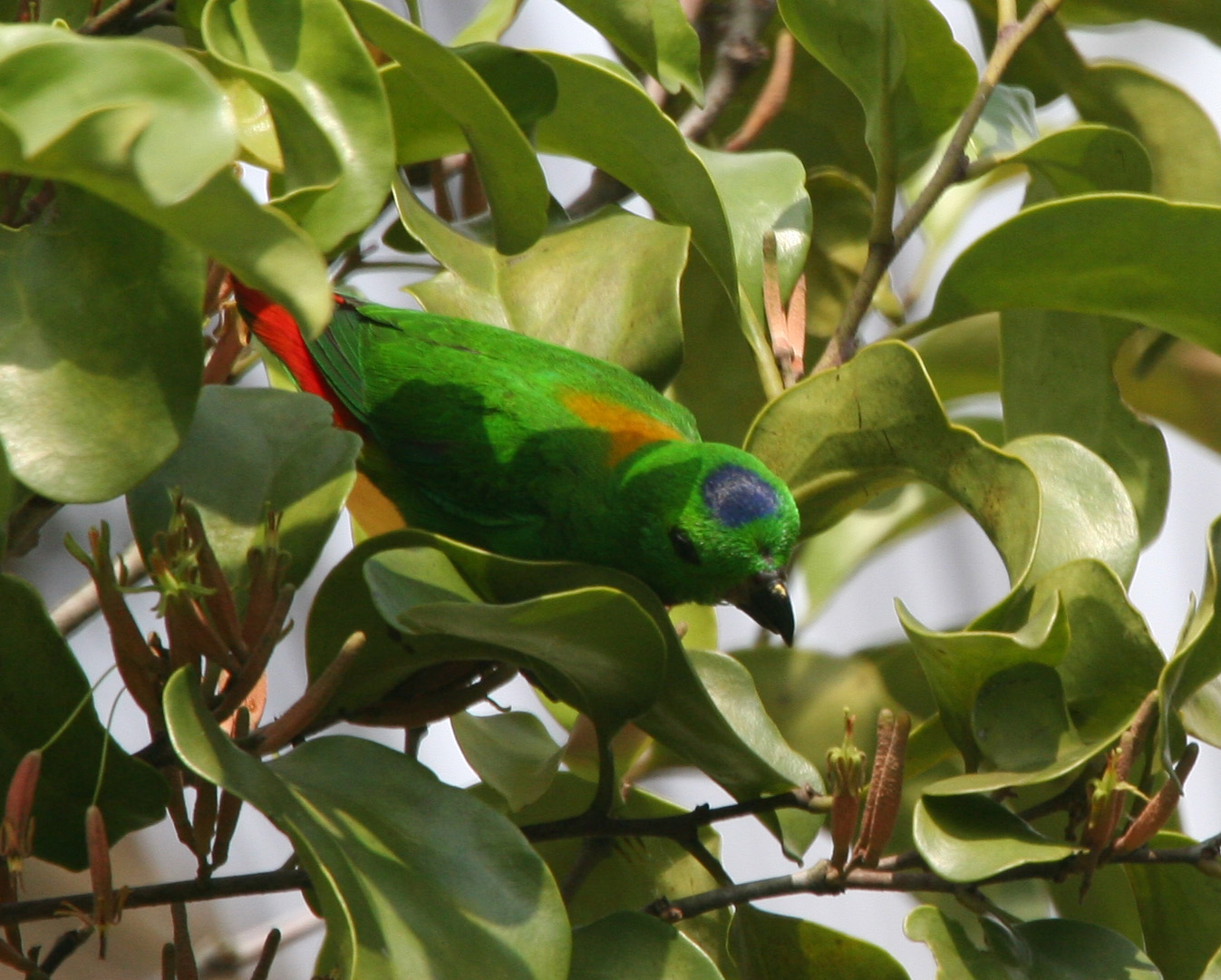
- Male, Singapore
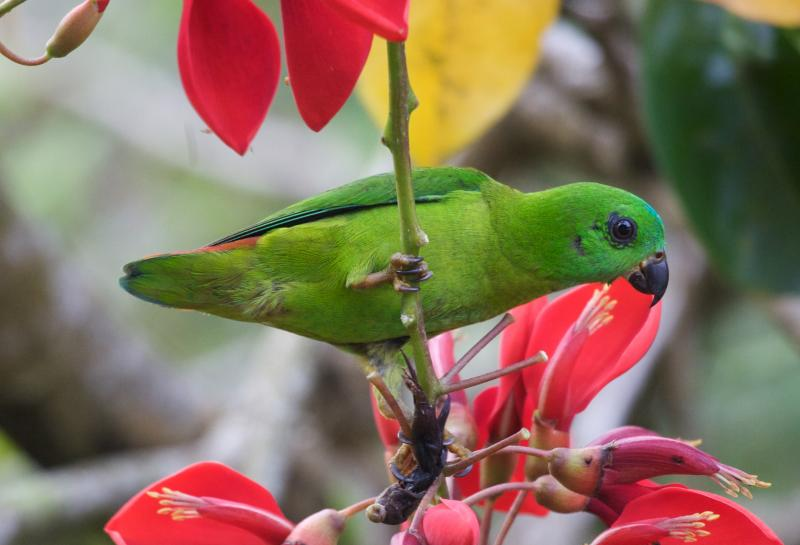
- Female, Singapore

Conservation status
- Least Concern (IUCN 3.1)

Scientific classification
- Kingdom: Animalia
- Phylum: Chordata
- Class: Aves
- Order: Psittaciformes
- Family: Psittaculidae
- Genus: Loriculus
- Species: L. galgulus

Binomial name
- Loriculus galgulus (Linnaeus, 1758)

Synonyms
- Psittacus galgulus Linnaeus, 1758

= Blue-crowned hanging parrot =

Species of bird

The blue-crowned hanging parrot (Loriculus galgulus) is a parrot species endemic to southern Burma and Thailand, Malaya, Singapore, and Indonesia (Sumatra, Java, Borneo). These parrots are 12 cm (4.7 in) in height and weigh 28 g (0.99 oz) and have a longevity of 14 years. They are recognized by their green plumage, black beak and characteristic blue feathers arranged like a crown on their head.

== Taxonomy ==
The blue-crowned hanging parrot was formally described in 1758 by the Swedish naturalist Carl Linnaeus in the tenth edition of his Systema Naturae. He placed it with all the other parrots in the genus Psittacus and coined the binomial name Psittacus galgulus. The type locality is the Malaysian state of Malacca. The blue-crowned hanging parrot is now one of 14 hanging parrots placed in the genus Loriculus that was introduced in 1849 by the English zoologist Edward Blyth. The genus name is a diminutive of the genus Lorius that was introduced by Nicholas Aylward Vigors for the lorys in 1825. The specific epithet galgulus is an unidentified small bird described by the Roman author Pliny the Elder as hanging by its feet. The species is monotypic: no subspecies are recognised.

== Description ==
Blue-crowned hanging parrots have green plumage and adults have black beaks. There is sexual dimorphism between males and females of the species. Adult males have a characteristic blue "crown" patch on their head and a red mark on their throat as well as a red rump bordered by a yellow lower back. Adult females plumage is duller green in color compared to the males, they do not have the red throat mark and have a less apparent or absent blue crown on the head and lack yellow feathers on their lower back. Juveniles' plumage is dull green, they also have little to no blue crown patch, they have a little to no blue crown visible and their bills are light in color.

The calls these birds make when flying are shrill and squeaky. When flying in flocks, the calls can be described as rapid and ringing. As they forage, they utter shrill two-syllable calls.

== Distribution and habitat ==
The blue-crowned hanging parrot is distributed throughout southern Thailand, western Malaysia, Singapore, Sumatra, Borneo and other nearby islands. The parrot inhabits forests, forest edges, swamps, riverine forest, bamboo patches, mangrove wooded gardens, and coconut groves, as well as plantations.

Throughout its range, Sulawesi is the only area where more than one Loriculus species is found because intraspecific competition usually prevents other closely related species from overlapping.

== Behaviour ==
The hanging parrot can be observed travelling alone, in pairs, or in parties of 150 individuals in the canopy. During the mating season, bonded pairs will remain together and the male will chase off any other male that approaches.

Characteristic of hanging parrots, the blue-crowned hanging parrot sleeps upside down by hanging from tree branches. The birds climb or fly up tall trees and will hang by either both feet or only one foot and will fluff their feathers and tuck their head and neck into their body. This behaviour evolved in order to limit nighttime predation. The parrot's green plumage and hanging sleeping position imitates leaves among trees to camouflage themselves among the foliage. This behaviour was likely evolved from a common ancestor of Loriculus and Agapornis parrots endemic to Africa.

Young and sick birds are unable to hang and will perch sitting upright to sleep with their head turned to one side while tucked into the back feathers. Young birds have undeveloped modifications necessary for hanging but develop these rapidly as they fledge.

=== Breeding ===
The blue-crowned hanging parrot forms bonded pairs during January to July for the breeding season. In order to court a female, the male will display by strutting; where the red rump, tail coverts, and red throat feathers are fluffed up. The male will erect his body and spread his tail and bob his head while running across a branch or perch. With wings held low, he makes soft twittery "jeet jeet" call while showing off his red and gold rump on his lower back to nearby females. In response, a female who is not impressed by the male will react aggressively by chasing him away, or she may act indifferently. If the female is interested in the male, she will actively encourage him and accept food from him. The pair's bond is maintained in this species through courtship feeding where the male will regurgitate food and offer it to a female. The female who accepts the food will perch close to the male and they then spend most of their time together.

The parrots will carry nesting material in their contour feathers by tucking them with their beaks. The nests are built by the bird in natural cavities like open tree branches and made out of substrate like bark and leaves the bird finds in its habitat. The females have a gestation period of 20 days where she will incubate her eggs inside the nest. A single clutch can have up to 4 eggs and the chicks leave the nest about 33 days after hatching.

=== Food and feeding ===
Hanging parrots eat mainly fruits, such as papaya and rambutan, in the wild but will also feed on palm oil nuts, seeds, nectar, and fresh flowers. The blue-crowned hanging parrot employs different feeding methods. Young birds usually use their mandibles to nibble and break off pieces of food when perching and will flick their heads rapidly to remove the pulp after extracting its juice. Adults use their feet or bills to carry food and will feed when perching. Feeding usually occurs away from the food source after being carried to a perch. The bird can bring the food held up by the foot to its beak to feed and they can also hold up their foot and lower their head to feed. Other methods involve holding the food between its claws on the perch and lowering the head completely to feed.

== Relationship to humans ==
This species is commonly called Serindit Melayu in the Riau province and are typically kept as pets. The blue-crowned hanging parrot are important to the flora and Riau identity. Its name is used in "Hulu Keris", an important symbol of the province as part of the traditional clothing of Riau symbolizing courage, wisdom when upholding truth and justice. In Riau folklore stories of the faunal world, the hanging parrot is referred to as Panglima Hijau. In Malay literature, the blue-crowned hanging parrot symbolically represents love and is considered a love-bird. It is also commonly referred to in rhymes and poetry and is used in ritual activities.
