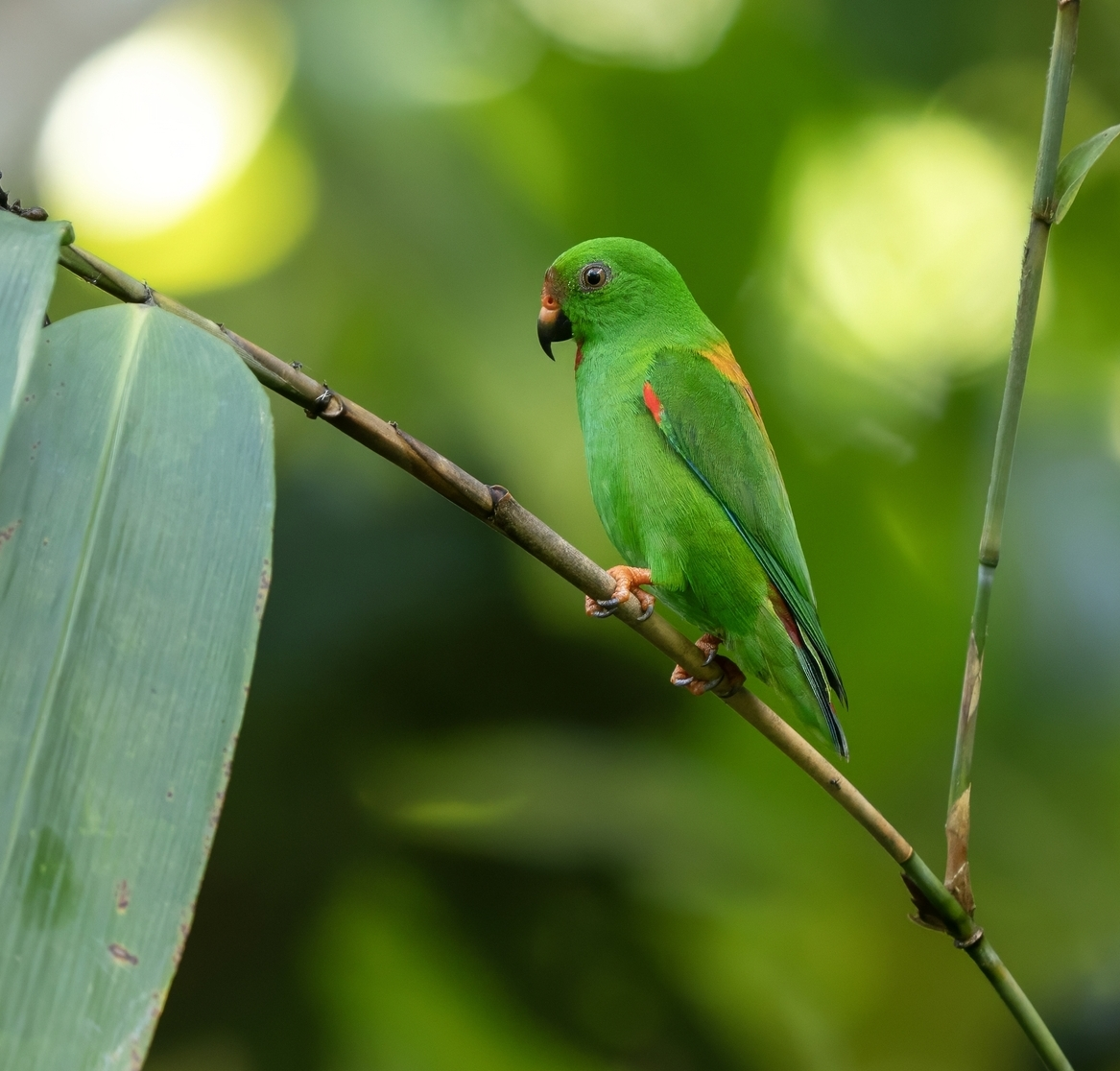

Conservation status
- Least Concern (IUCN 3.1)

Scientific classification
- Kingdom: Animalia
- Phylum: Chordata
- Class: Aves
- Order: Psittaciformes
- Family: Psittaculidae
- Genus: Loriculus
- Species: L. sclateri

Binomial name
- Loriculus sclateri Wallace, 1863

= Sula hanging parrot =

Species of bird

The Sula hanging parrot (Loriculus sclateri) is a small species of parrot in the family Psittaculidae. It is endemic to forest and nearby habitats on the Banggai and Sula Islands in Indonesia.

== Description and taxonomy ==
The Sula hanging parrot has sometimes been treated as a subspecies of the Moluccan hanging parrot, but the two are increasingly treated as separate species based on their distinct differences in plumage and size (14 cm for the Sula hanging parrot versus 11 cm (4 in) for the Moluccan hanging parrot). When recognized as separate species, the Sula hanging parrot has often been treated as monotypic, but the subspecies L. s. ruber from the Banggai Islands has recently been re-validated, leaving the nominate for the Sula Islands. Both subspecies have an overall green plumage with red to the chin, rump and leading edge of the wing. In L. s. sclateri the mantle varies from all mustard-orange to red broadly edged by orange, while the mantle of L. s. ruber is red with very little orange edge. Furthermore, the red rump is brighter in L. s. ruber than in L. s. sclateri.

== Distribution and habitat ==
The Sula hanging parrot is found throughout the Sula Islands, Banggi Island, Peleng, Melilis Island, Labobo Island, Seho Island, and other small surrounding islands. However, it is absent from Bengkulu Island and Sulawesi.

== Ecology ==
The Sula hanging parrot is usually present in areas below 450 meters in old-growth forest, secondary forest, near agricultural land with scattered trees, plantations, and forest edges. It is usually found singly or in small groups. Pairs usually nest in tree and stump burrows, as they prefer narrow, long burrows with small holes. To carry back nesting materials to build a nest inside the burrow, this species tucks in materials such as small twigs under its wing and then carries it back to their nesting site. Breeding usually takes place from January to April while a second season happens from July to September. During breeding season the male performs an elaborate courtship display to attract a female. In the display, the male approaches the female with small steps and hops while making a warbling sound. He also extends his neck to show of his blue throat patch while raising his rump, displaying his tail feathers. The species also engages in courtship feeding. Females lay a clutch of 2 to 4 eggs. The female incubate the eggs for approximately 20 days while the male feeds her. Eggs are usually 15 – 18 mm long. Young birds fledge at around 32 days of age and are usually fully independent in 10–11 days.

== Conservation ==
Like most other birds in the genus Loriculus, the Sulu hanging parrot is threatened by deforestation to make way for farms, mining operations, and logging. It is also threatened by the illegal pet wildlife trade.
