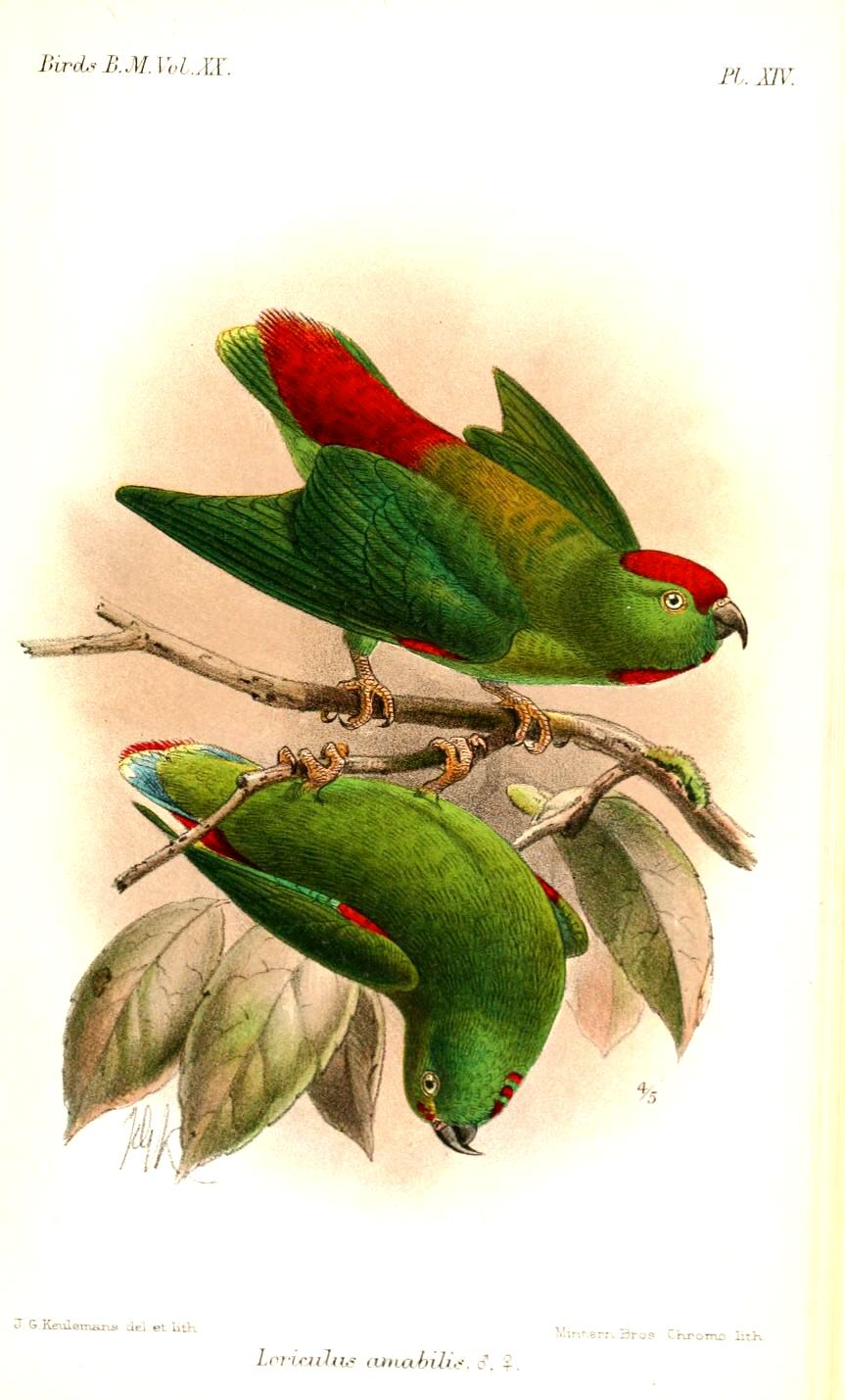
- Illustration by Keulemans, 1891
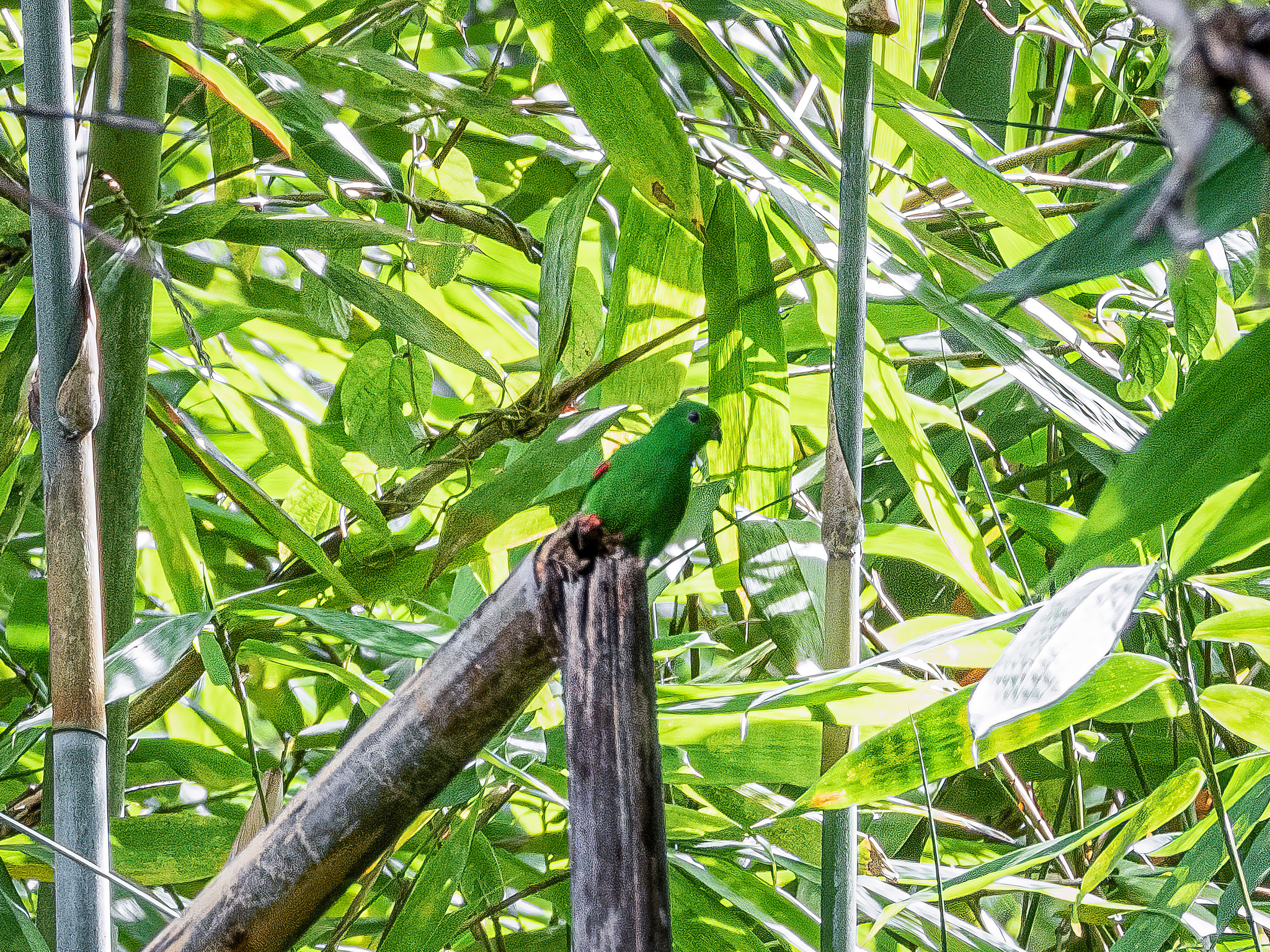

Conservation status
- Least Concern (IUCN 3.1)

Scientific classification
- Kingdom: Animalia
- Phylum: Chordata
- Class: Aves
- Order: Psittaciformes
- Family: Psittaculidae
- Genus: Loriculus
- Species: L. amabilis

Binomial name
- Loriculus amabilis Wallace, 1862

= Moluccan hanging parrot =

Species of bird

Moluccan hanging-parrot at Halmahera

The Moluccan hanging parrot (Loriculus amabilis) is a species of parrot in the family Psittaculidae. It is endemic to forest and nearby habitats on Halmahera, Bacan and Morotai in Indonesia. It has sometimes included the Sula hanging parrot as a subspecies, but the two are increasingly treated as separate species based on their distinct differences in plumage and size (11 cm for the Moluccan hanging parrot versus 14 cm for the Sula hanging parrot).
