= Breeding behaviour of birds =

Bird behaviour related to reproduction and early development

The breeding behaviour of birds encompasses a range of activities associated with the reproductive cycle of birds, from courtship to the fledging of the young. This behaviour includes mate selection, nest building, egg laying, incubation, and parental care until the young become fledged. During this period, birds actively defend their territory. Most species provide extensive care to their offspring, though exceptions exist. Approximately 90% of bird species are monogamous during a breeding season, with females typically choosing mates based on appearance, skills, and song. In polygamous species, such as pheasants, males often do not participate in raising young, leaving the responsibility to females.

== Breeding site ==
=== Number of individuals at nesting sites ===
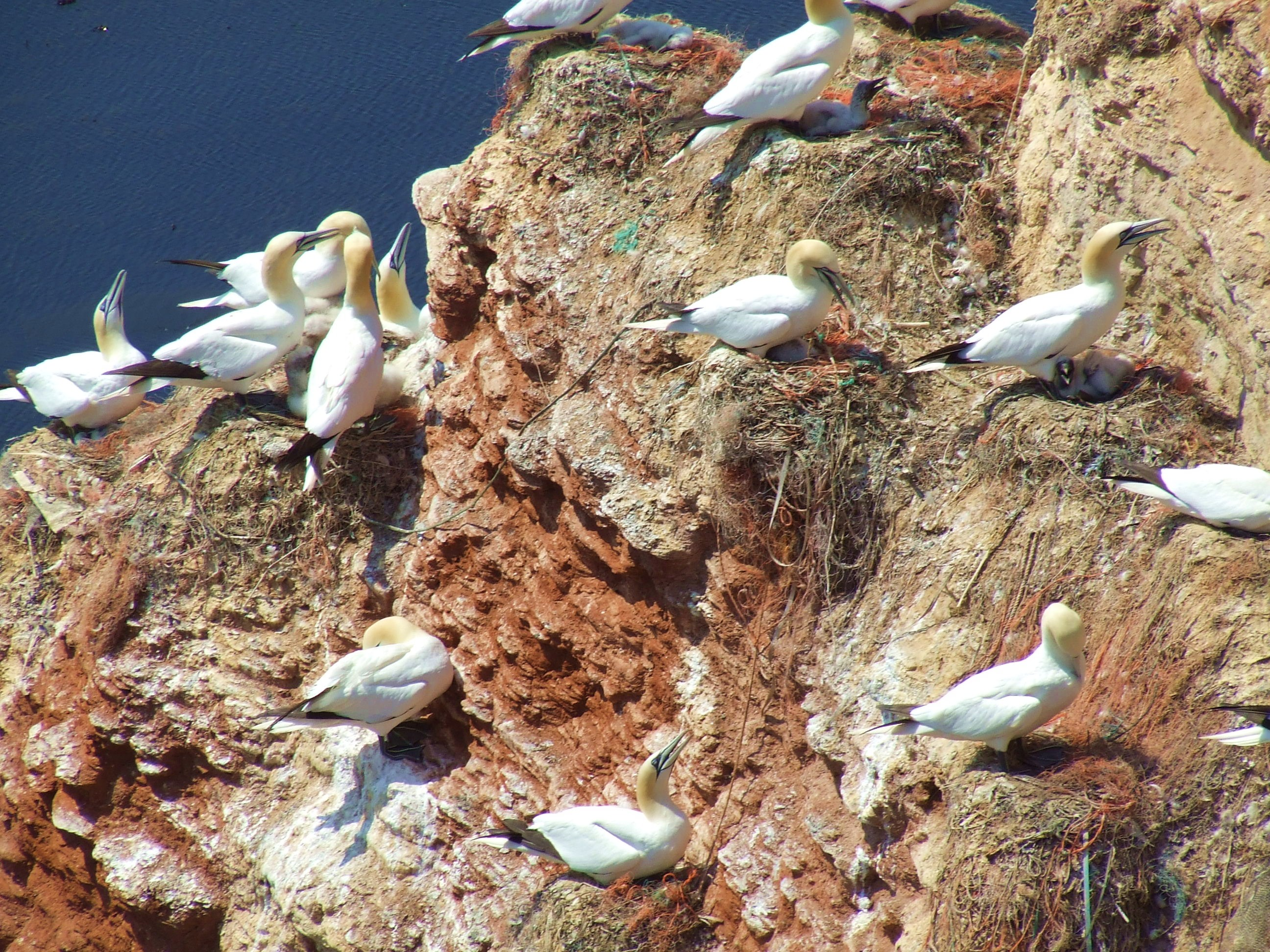
A section of a nesting colony of northern gannets

The number of birds at a nesting site largely depends on food availability. Seabirds typically nest in large colonies due to limited suitable locations, which are often far apart. These birds return to the same site annually, usually breeding with the same partner and reusing the same nesting spot for years.

Terrestrial birds face fewer constraints and may select new territories each year. However, cavity nesters, such as woodpeckers, are limited by the availability of suitable tree cavities. A cavity must have the right diameter, and even a brief absence can result in it being occupied by another bird.

=== Nesting season ===
The timing of breeding varies by region. In northern Europe, nesting is influenced by day length and temperature, with chicks hatching when food is most abundant. Equatorial species may breed year-round. Nomadic desert birds, such as budgerigar and zebra finch, begin breeding at the onset of the rainy season. Similarly, the central Australian desert lark typically nests between July and November but will breed opportunistically if rains occur outside this period. The breeding of Snow petrel depends on snow accumulation, nesting up to 300 km inland in Antarctica. Frozen nesting sites prevent breeding.

=== Territory ===
Recording of a Eurasian wren song

Males initiate the breeding season by claiming a territory sufficient to provide food for their young, though this varies by territory type. Territories range from 90 cm² to several kilometres in diameter, depending on the species. Pair formation occurs within the territory, and nests are often, but not always, built there.

Males aggressively defend their territory, primarily through song to signal occupancy. Physical fights are rare and seldom result in injury or death. An exception is the European robin, which fiercely defends its territory, sometimes leading to severe injury or death.

Common murres have the smallest territories, laying a single egg on a cliff ledge with just a few centimetres of space. Despite their 42 cm body length, pairs can nest at a density of 20 per m².

=== Habitat selection ===
Not all habitats are equally suitable for nesting. Evolutionarily, habitats that support higher offspring survival enhance fitness. Birds initially target optimal sites, but high density can reduce habitat quality, making it comparable to less desirable sites. Poorer habitats support fewer pairs, leading to higher nest density in better habitats, balancing overall quality. For example, in an American herring gull colony on Newfoundland's Great Island, rocky ledges (10% of the area but hosting 22% of the population) are preferred, with gulls laying more eggs and chicks growing faster than in meadows or on grassy slopes. However, high density increases chick mortality, resulting in similar breeding success across habitats (about half the fledglings per egg laid).

=== Habitat modification ===
Materials brought to nesting colonies and accumulated guano contribute to soil formation in some conditions, creating ornithogenic soils.

== Reproductive strategies ==
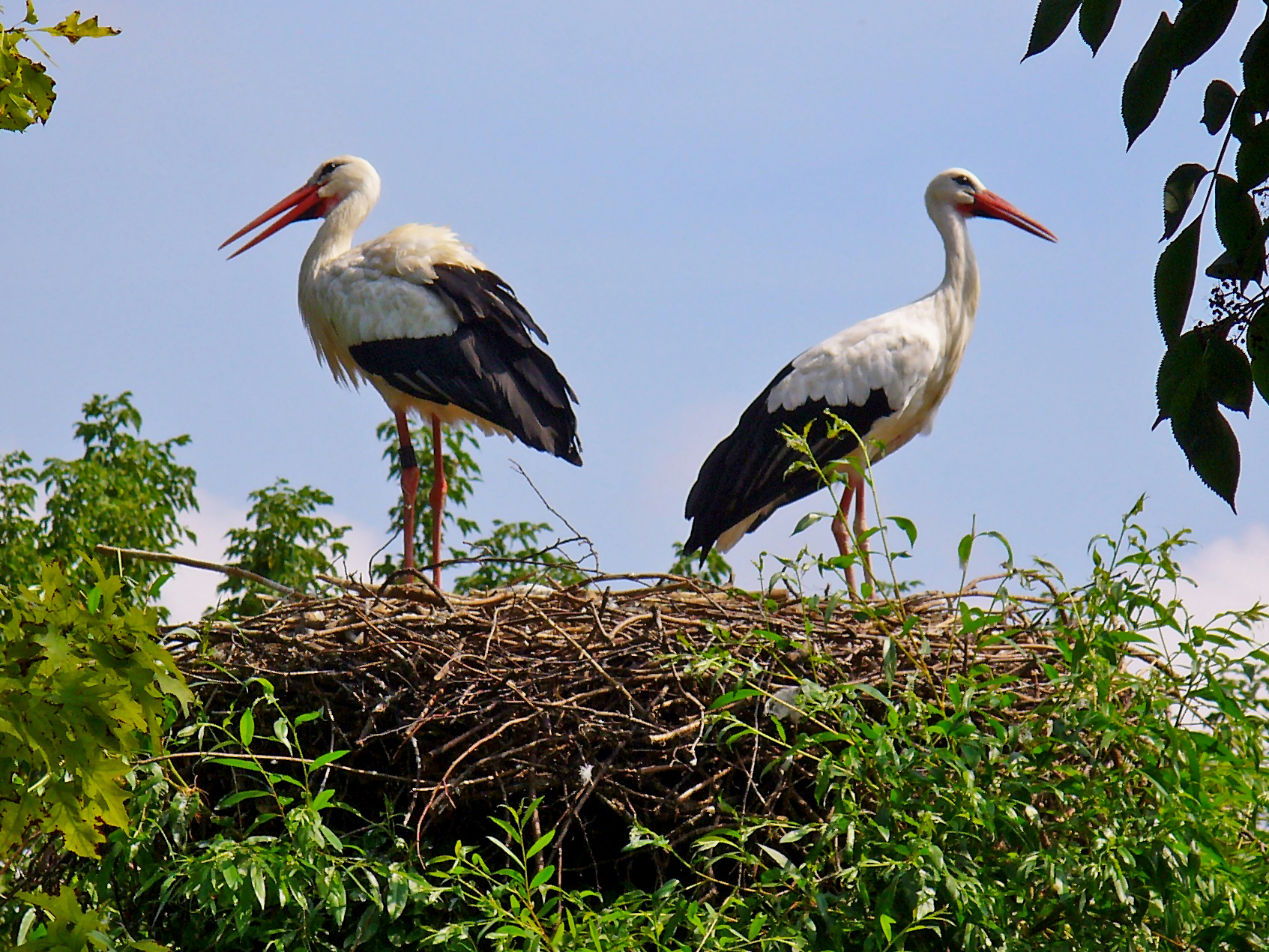
White storks are monogamous

About 90% of birds are monogamous within a breeding season, maintaining pair bonds during breeding and often raising subsequent broods together. Some species, like white storks and mute swans, form lifelong pairs. However, white storks are more attached to their nest than their partner. Males arrive days earlier to repair the nest, and if the female does not return from Africa, another female may take her place, forming a new pair.

Polygamous birds, such as galliformes, have multiple partners. Males aim to mate with as many females as possible in a season. Some monogamous birds engage in extra-pair copulations while maintaining their primary partner, known as social monogamy.

Other strategies exist, such as promiscuity in the aquatic warbler, where multiple males and females mate interchangeably, resulting in clutches with offspring from up to five males.

Male common blackbirds may collectively force copulation on females. Male mallards, despite being monogamous, engage in similar behaviour, sometimes leading to the female being drowned. This can result in interspecies hybrids, even outside the genus Anas.

=== Female mimicry ===
In the ruff, a unique form of female mimicry occurs, with some males, called faeders, resembling females. While typical males are larger and more brightly coloured with strong sexual dimorphism, faeders are only slightly larger than females, adopt female-like plumage during the breeding season, but possess testicles 2.5 times larger than those of typical males. Faeders, comprising around 1% of the population, form a cooperative relationship with dominant males. Copulations involve various combinations, including dominant males mating with faeders or females, and faeders mating with other males or females. Initially thought to represent an ancestral behaviour where males resembled females for shared parental care (faeder meaning "father" in Old English), current evidence suggests faeders exploit opportunities to fertilise females paired with other males.

== Mate identification ==
Mate identification in many birds involves imprinting. Newly hatched chicks instinctively focus on a large, moving object, which becomes the template for their parent during the chick stage and their mate during adulthood. In natural conditions, this is almost always the actual parent, leading adults to seek mates of their own species. However, if an egg or chick is transferred to another nest or incubator, such as in farms or zoos, the chick may imprint on a different species. As adults, these birds display courtship behaviour toward that other species, using gestures typical of their own species, which often fails to convey intent. Common cases involve humans (breeders), but examples include geese courting chickens or peafowl courting turtles. Such behaviour has also been observed in house sparrows and western jackdaws.

This imprinting also affects captive birds. Society finches incubate foreign eggs and raise chicks as their own, but these chicks, as adults, prefer to mate with society finches rather than their own species. Similarly, European goldfinches may court their human caretakers.

== Courtship ==
=== Male displays ===
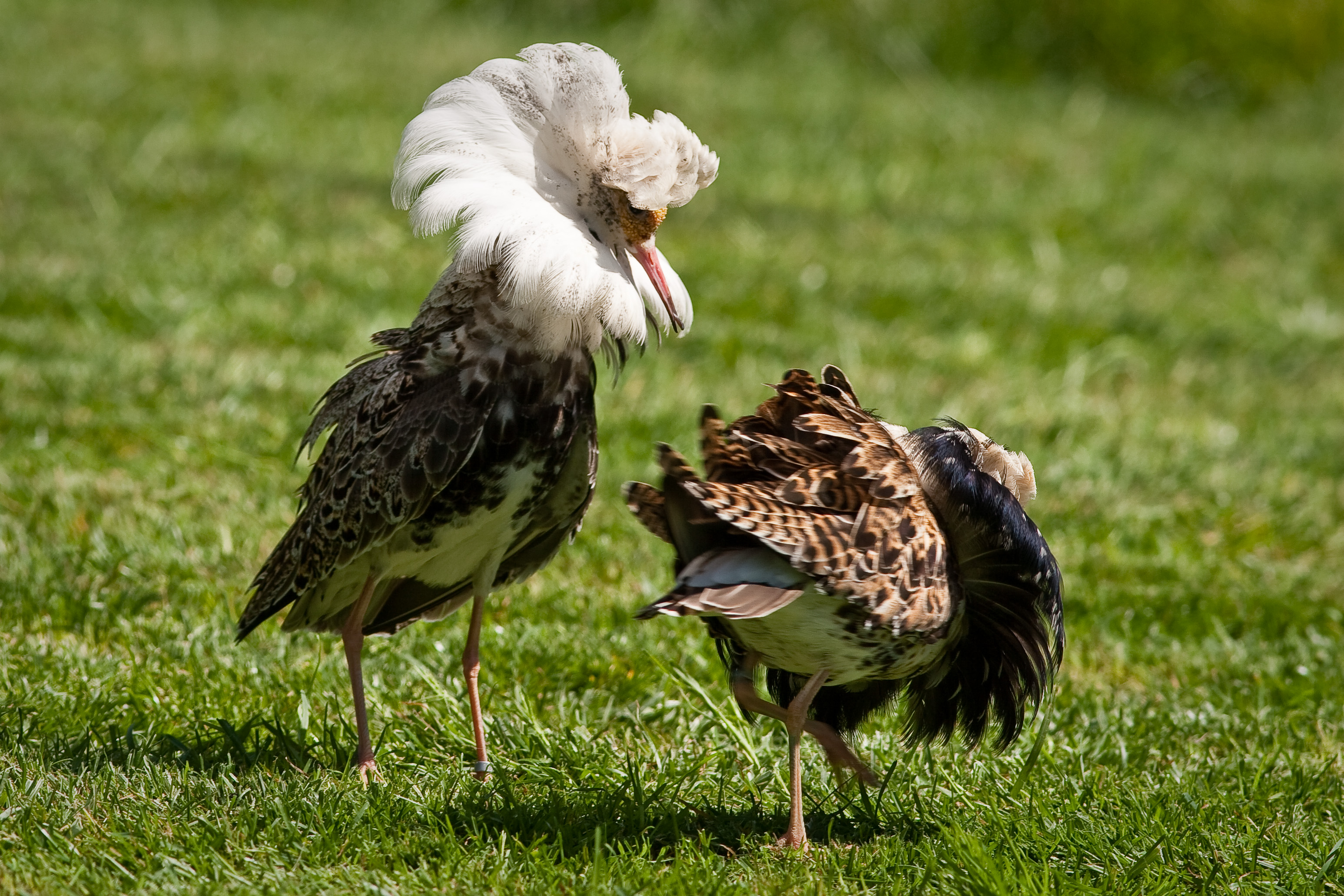
Courting ruffs

Females typically choose males based on appearance, skills, and song. In polygamous species like pheasants, males often do not contribute to chick-rearing, leaving it to females.

Males may display vibrant plumage or sing to attract mates, often adopting a breeding plumage. Male rock sparrows puff up their breast feathers to reveal a normally hidden yellow breast patch. Studies on great tits show females prefer males with wider black belly stripes, confirmed by experiments where thicker stripes were artificially added, making males more attractive and perceived as dominant.

In song-based courtship, the loudest or most complex singer is often chosen. Singing also signals territory occupancy, with males perching high to project sound.

In some species, like the Eurasian dotterel, females court males, displaying brighter plumage. Males then handle incubation, nest maintenance, and chick care.

=== Lekking grounds ===
Lekking grounds are sites where males gather to display, typically at dawn or occasionally dusk, aiming to position themselves near the centre. Common pheasants lek alone on small patches of trampled grass, emitting hoarse calls every few minutes, while species like manakins, cotingas, and hummingbirds display on branches or in flight.

Display flights may showcase agility, often accompanied by song. For example, Eurasian skylark and common snipe perform aerial displays, with the snipe's tail feathers vibrating to produce a buzzing sound.

=== Feather preening and feeding ===
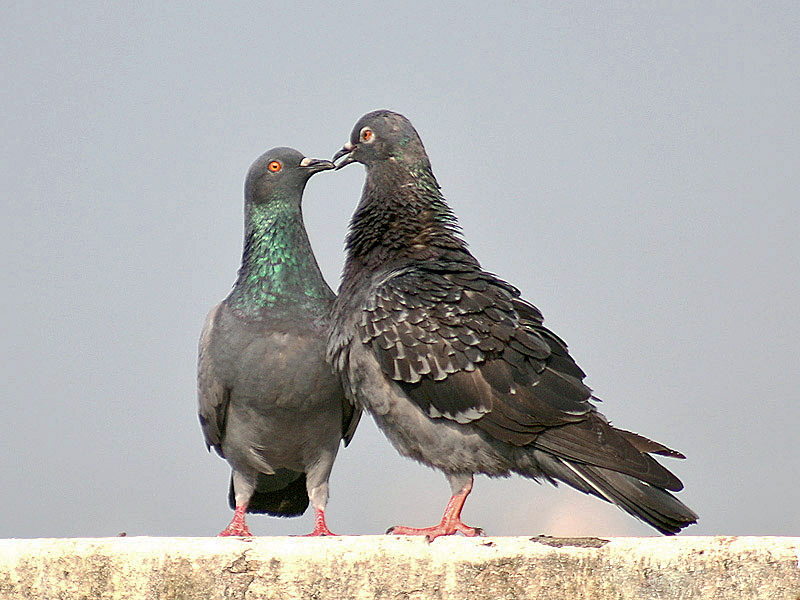
A pair of feral pigeons allopreening

Birds preen feathers to clean and align them, but this also strengthens pair bonds, continuing long after pairing. Preening can reduce aggression when another bird approaches too closely, as seen in parrots and estrildid finches, which appear to enjoy physical contact.

Feeding a partner, observed in common kingfishers, demonstrates a male's ability to provide for offspring. Males offer fish, sometimes repeatedly, to prove their capability. Gulls exhibit similar behaviour, with females emitting begging calls resembling the calls of young chicks. Male Eurasian blue tits feed females to build energy reserves for egg-laying and to reinforce pair bonds. Birds may also offer nesting materials.

=== Mating dances ===
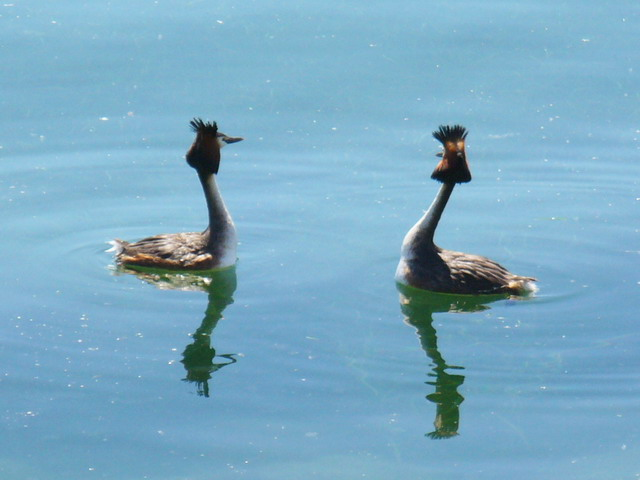
Dancing great crested grebes

Species like great crested grebes and cranes perform species-specific mating dances to strengthen pair bonds. Subtle differences in dances prevent hybridisation between closely related species. Errors in dance movements can lead to pair dissolution, typically after a second mistake. Dances range from seconds to hours.

Bald eagles perform a unique aerial dance, where the female flips upside-down in mid-flight, and the male grasps her talons.

=== Bowers ===
Male bowerbirds construct bowers, structures composed of upright grass and sticks, decorated with feathers, fruit, stones, or debris. Depending on the species, the bowers resemble tunnels or thatched huts, up to 1.5 metres tall. Satin bowerbirds prefer blue decorations. Females assess the bower quality, and if impressed, mate with the male. The female then builds a separate nest for egg-laying.

== Copulation ==
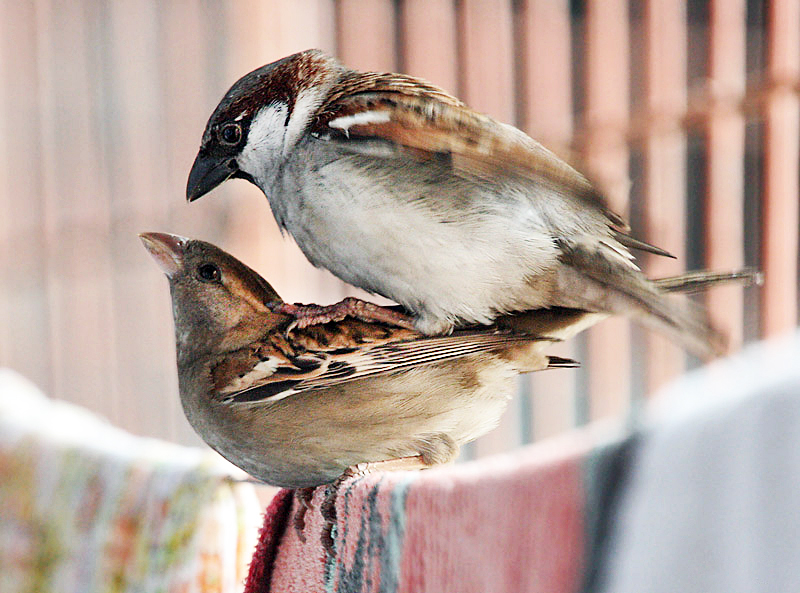
Copulating house sparrows

Copulation typically lasts 1–2 seconds but can be longer in some species, such as the aquatic warbler, where captive observations recorded 40-minute sessions. Most birds lack a penis, requiring cloaca contact. The male mounts the female, balancing with gentle wing flaps.

== Nest ==
Most birds build nests, though emperor penguins and king penguins warm eggs on their feet and beneath their brood patch, and gannets incubate their eggs between their webbed feet. Passerines usually abandon nests after breeding, while Eurasian magpie and hooded crow nests may be reused by long-eared owls and common kestrels. Bird of prey and those with large nests, like storks, reinforce nests annually, with older, greyer layers at the bottom and fresher, browner layers on top. Building a nest with thousands of pieces of moss, grass, and hair takes several days.

Nests are often lined with soft materials like feathers, hair, or fine roots. Urban birds, including storks, may incorporate debris, posing risks like water accumulation in plastic-lined nests, drowning chicks, or entanglement in string causing strangulation or necrosis.

Nests are typically placed in inaccessible locations. Grebes build floating nests, relatively safe from predators; they cover eggs with weed when leaving. Burrowing is rare, but is seen in species like common shelducks, puffins, and many petrels. Passerines nest in trees, grass, or shrubs, while raptors nest in trees, except for the hen harrier, which nests in tall ground vegetation. Western house martins initially build nests with a small entrance, widened after completion.

Nest-building duties vary by species. Females often lead, with males assisting in some cases. Male masked weavers build grass nests alone on branch tips. Female Eurasian chaffinches build with male supervision. Female pheasants handle all nesting tasks unaided.

Growing chicks can stretch nests. Long-tailed tit nests become cramped, deforming the female's rectrices. Woodpecker chicks in cavities stack vertically to conserve space and heat, as seen in Eurasian wrynecks.

Contrary to myth, human handling of nests or eggs does not lead to abandonment, as most birds, except some raptors and petrels, lack a significant sense of smell. Temporarily removing Montagu's harrier chicks from nests in crops during harvesting aids conservation. However, approaching nests can disturb birds, potentially causing permanent abandonment, especially early in breeding. Legal protection often restricts nest access, and observers should approach noisily to allow birds to leave calmly.

=== Nest types ===
Nests are classified into three main types; hidden, semi-open, and open, with subtypes. Hidden nests are further divided into above-ground and underground, each split into lined and unlined:

- Hidden nests – completely concealed:
  - Above-ground – lined or unlined, located in natural or excavated tree cavities or nest boxes. Lined examples include common starlings and Eurasian nuthatches; unlined include woodpeckers.
  - Underground – lined or unlined, in burrows, riverbanks, rock crevices, or building gaps. Species like common shelduck, European bee-eater, common kingfisher, and sand martin use such nests.
- Semi-open nests – in shallow cavities, rock crevices, or building recesses, typically well-lined, e.g., black redstart.
- Open nests – highly variable, either open or closed, placed among branches, near tree trunks, on the ground, or on water. Examples include closed nests of Eurasian penduline tits and open nests of mute swans.

== Eggs ==
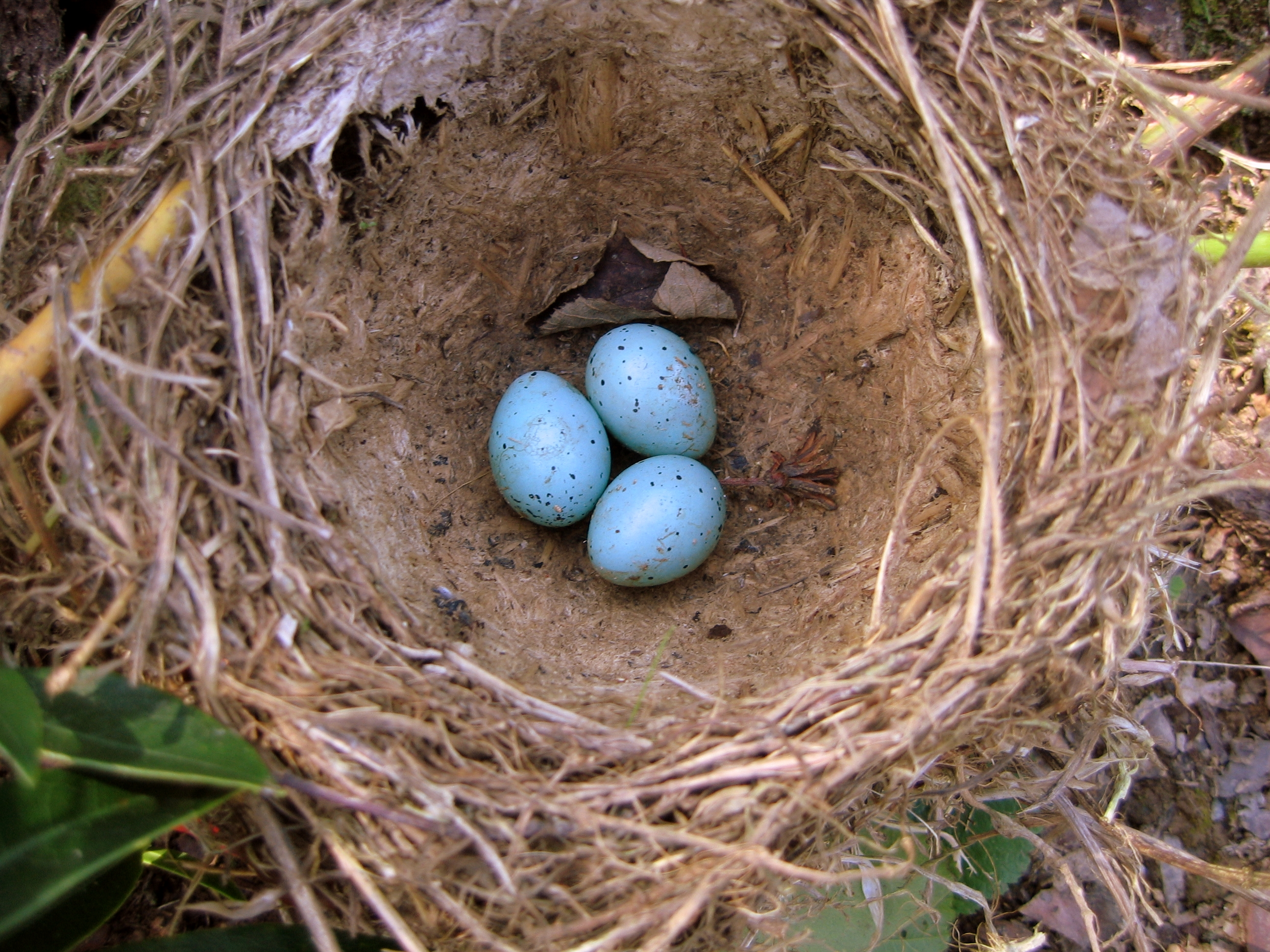
Song thrush eggs in a nest

Eggs are usually camouflaged, but cavity nesters like woodpeckers lay white eggs. Grebe eggs gradually stain from surrounding water weed and decaying plants. The time from copulation to egg-laying ranges from days to months. On cliffs, eggs of species like common murres are elongated and tapered, rolling in a tight circle if disturbed to prevent rolling off cliff ledges.

=== Egg count ===
Clutch size varies by species, typically ranging from one to a dozen eggs, excluding domesticated layer hens. Examples include emperor penguin (1 egg), rock dove (1–2), gulls (3), Canada goose (4–6), and hooded merganser (10–11). Some species, like pigeons, lay a fixed number, adjusting to additions or removals, while others lay until the nest is full. In experiments, removing eggs prompted females to lay more, with European herring gulls producing up to a dozen, house sparrows and northern flickers dozens, and mallards up to a hundred. Birds lay fewer eggs than their brood patch could cover, balancing energy costs and chick survival, a concept known as Lack's clutch size, maintained by balancing selection.

=== Incubation ===
Egg development requires warmth, usually from a parent's body during incubation. In polygamous species like black grouse, females handle all nesting tasks alone, while males may assist in monogamous species, often incubating during the day. In Lichtenstein's sandgrouse, males incubate at night due to their less cryptic plumage. Females typically have camouflaged plumage to avoid predators.

Incubation periods vary; the shortest is some of the larks such as horned lark, which incubates for 10–14 days, while snowy albatross takes about 82 days for its single egg. Eggs are usually rotated regularly to ensure even incubation heating. Malleefowl males bury eggs in decaying leaves for warmth. Incubating birds develop brood patches of vascularised, featherless skin areas – singly (e.g., Accipitrinae, Columbidae, many songbirds), in pairs (e.g., waders, auks, skuas), or triply (e.g., gulls). Some, like pelicans and Sulidae, use foot skin instead. Emperor penguins and king penguins have skin-fold brood pouches. Non-incubating species, like some cuckoos, lack brood patches.

=== Hatching ===
Hatching can be synchronous (chicks hatch within hours, fed equally) or asynchronous (chicks hatch as eggs are laid, e.g., in pelicans, owls, Accipitriformes, and grey herons).

Chicks escape eggs by pecking to remove the cap (e.g., pheasants) or breaking the shell into irregular pieces (e.g., Eurasian curlew). Parents remove or swallow eggshells to conceal the nest from predators.

== Chicks ==
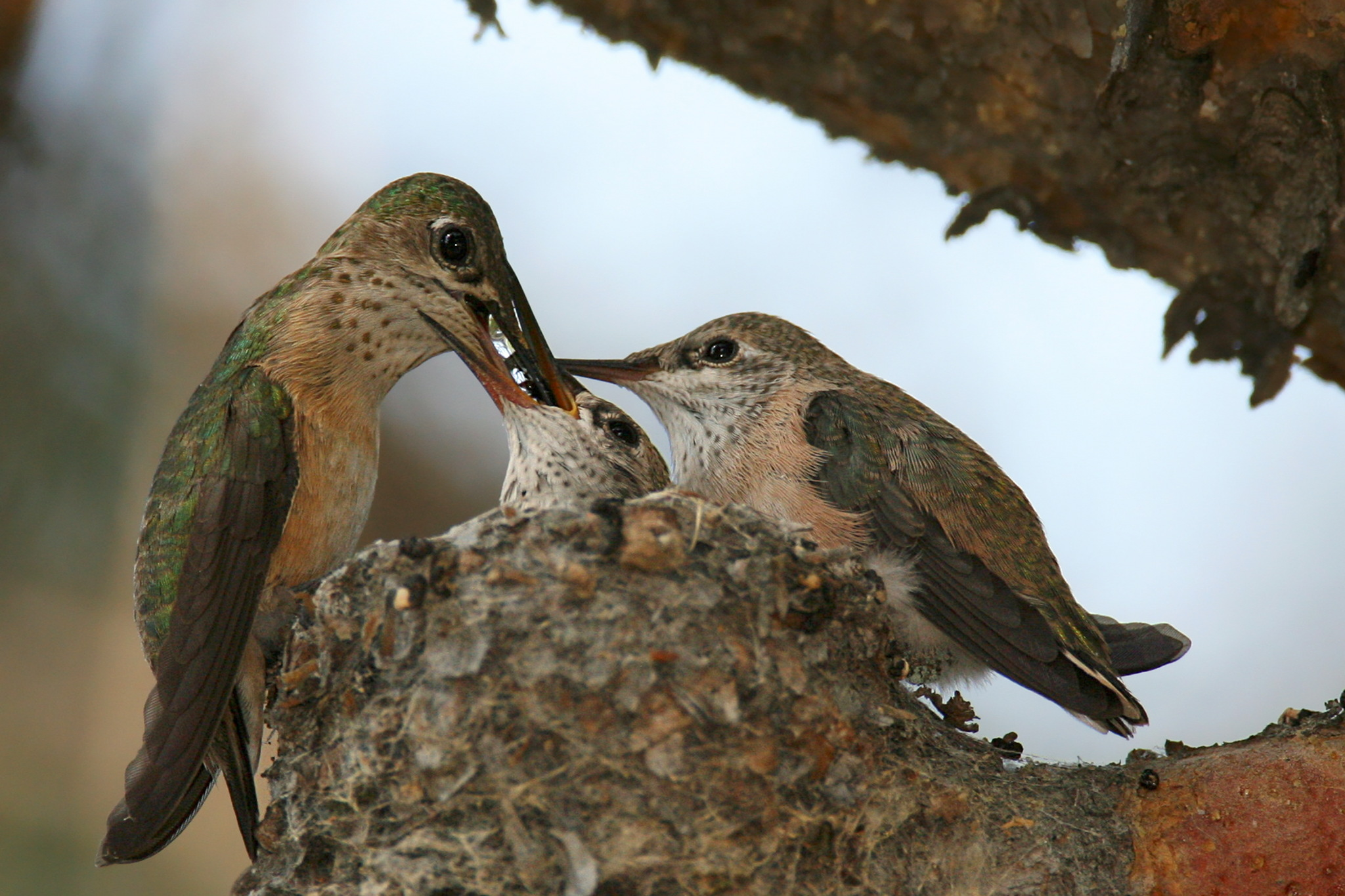
Parents feeding a young calliope hummingbird

In asynchronous hatching, older chicks may harass or starve younger siblings. In food scarcity, older chicks may kill and eat younger ones (siblicide) if carnivorous, or parents may selectively feed the eldest, leading to starvation of the others.

All passerines feed their chicks, with thrushes making about 200 daily feeding trips and smaller birds like tits up to 2,000. Chicks signal hunger by opening brightly coloured and often patterned mouths. Parents remove faecal sacs to keep nests clean.

Some chicks, like those of Procellariiformes, are fed once daily or less. European storm petrel parents care constantly for the first week, then feed only at night.

A study of a common starling clutch in May found over 300 daily feeding trips, with each chick consuming an average of 58 Colorado potato beetles and 472 beetles daily. A pair's chicks ate 7,808 beetles over three weeks.

The bright red mouth interiors of some chicks results from high vascularisation. After feeding, blood shifts to digestion, and parents prioritise chicks with the brightest mouths.

Raptors feed less frequently but deliver larger quantities. Seabirds regurgitate partially digested food, which chicks consume from the parent's beak, easing digestion. Columbidae produce crop milk from their crop, a protein-rich fluid chicks drink from the parent's throat. Sandgrouse use their dense breast feathers to absorb water at visits to distant water sources, which they then bring for the chicks to drink in arid environments.

=== Brood parasitism ===
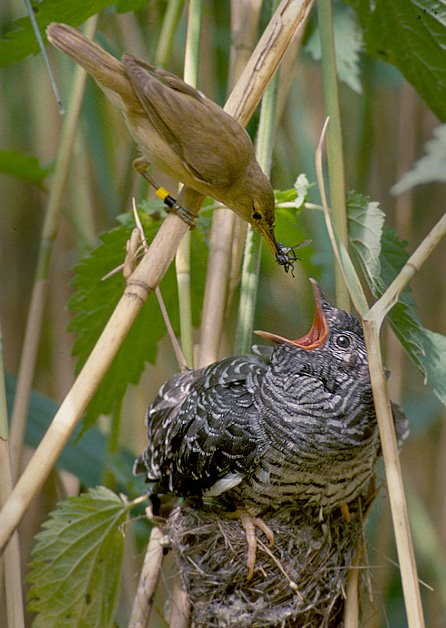
Common reed warbler feeding a common cuckoo chick

Brood parasitism involves laying eggs in another species' nest. The common cuckoo is a well-known brood parasite. Parasites must time their egg-laying precisely, often eating a host egg before laying their own. Hosts recognise eggs by pattern, not size. Parasite eggs have shorter incubation periods, sometimes starting in the oviduct, allowing earlier hatching.

Less than half of all cuckoo species are brood parasites. Other brood parasites include the black-headed duck, some whydahs (e.g., pin-tailed whydah), honeyguides, and cowbirds. Colonial-nesting gulls may lay eggs in neighbouring nests if unprepared or if their nest is destroyed.

=== Chick types ===
Chicks hatch at varying developmental stages, classified as altricial or precocial, with subtypes:

- Altricial proper – blind, featherless, or sparsely downed, requiring constant feeding and warming, e.g., Eurasian magpie.
- Altricial improper – hatched with open eyes and down, but remain in the nest, fed by parents who provide food directly, e.g., Accipitriformes and storks.
- Precocial improper – downy and sighted but unable to feed themselves, staying in the nest until fledging, e.g., European nightjar.
- Precocial proper – fully developed, following parents soon after hatching, e.g., mute swan and great crested grebe. Malleefowl chicks, with high yolk reserves, leave the mound independently and fly within a day.

Parental roles vary. Hazel grouse females lead chicks alone, while grebes split chick care equally.

== Older chicks ==
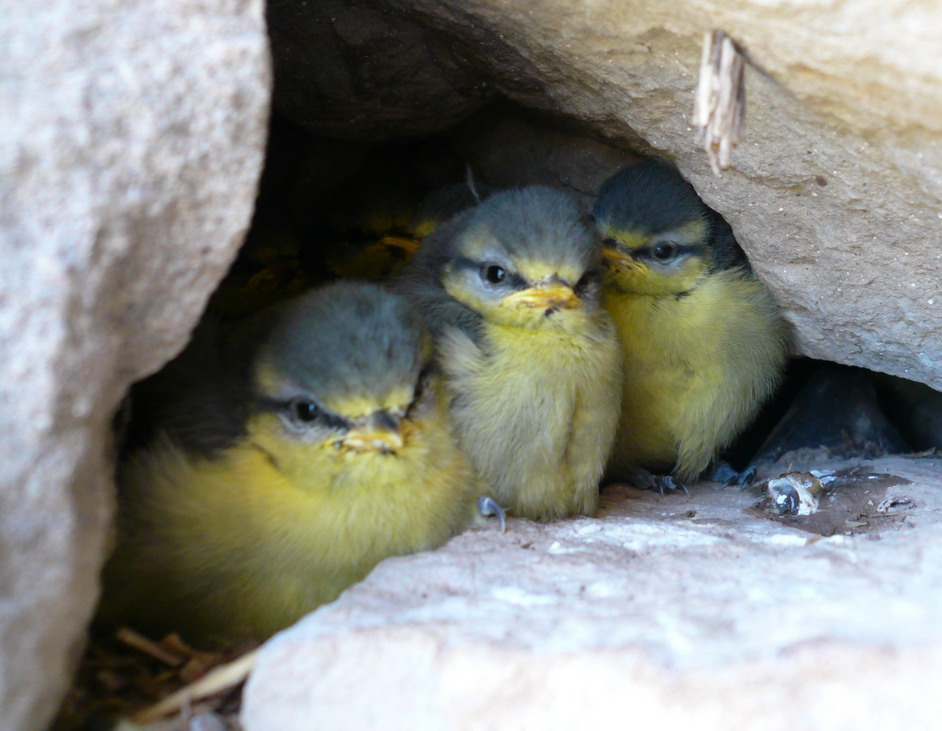
Young Eurasian blue tits awaiting food

Older chicks increasingly leave the nest to practice flying. Ostriches, flamingos, penguins, and waterfowl form "crèches" where groups of offspring are supervised by a few adults. Ostrich crèches involve dozens of chicks from multiple clutches under minimal adult care.

Fledglings face dangers, especially from humans. Mute swan fledgling mortality is about 80%, compared to 25% for adults annually. Young common cranes show aggression while still downy, so parents separate them. Fledglings wait for food separately to reduce the risk of entire broods being predated.

Great spotted kiwi chicks leave the nest immediately, fending for themselves. Most die before reaching 680 g (24 oz), at around 17–20 weeks.

Breeding age varies. Urban pigeons can breed at 6 months, while common wood pigeons wait a year. Vultures may not breed until 5–6 years, and some seabirds like fulmar not until 9 years old.

== Nest and chick protection ==
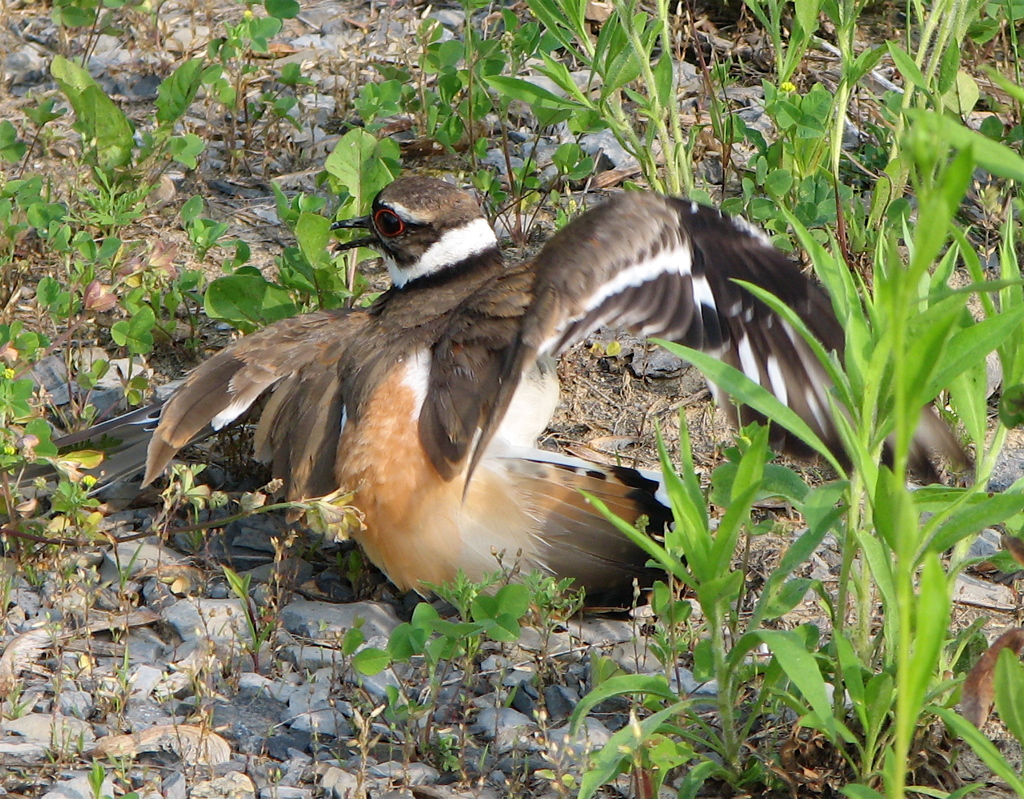
Killdeer luring a predator from its nest

Most birds abandon eggs under threat, opting to lay again, but some, like plovers, defend nests. They can feign a broken wing to lure predators away, then fly off when safely distant. Desert larks use similar tactics. Wagtails zigzag and call noisily to distract predators, a behaviour termed distraction display.

Young Eurasian hoopoes expel foul-smelling secretions, while Northern fulmars, especially chicks, vomit malodourous fish oil at predators. Common ringed plover chicks' cryptic plumage allows them to freeze against the ground, sometimes risking being stepped on.

Eurasian woodcocks carry chicks between their legs, stabilised by their beak, aided by high-set eyes. Male African jacanas carry up to two chicks under their wings, protecting them. Common reed buntings remain on nests tenaciously, even risking death.

Some species, like black-tailed godwits and northern lapwings, may protect nearby weaker species like pipits and wagtails by aggressively defending the area around their own nests. Lapwings scream and dive at predators, sometimes pecking them, and often land several metres from nests to avoid easy detection of their nest sites.

Eurasian nuthatches and hornbills seal nest entrances. Nuthatch females use clay to size the hole for their entry only. Hornbills use mud, leaving a small feeding slit. Common kingfishers dig upward-sloping burrows to prevent flooding. Great reed warblers adjust nest height based on predicted water levels.

Parents of open-nesting species like Eurasian coot will shield their chicks from rain, heat, or sun with wings and tails. Common whitethroats, despite hidden nests, exhibit similar behaviour.

Mute swans and owls defend nests aggressively. Swans have overturned boats near nests, and female Ural owls attack intruders with beaks and claws, potentially fatally, especially if nests are disturbed.

== Bibliography ==
- Burnie, David; Hoare, Ben; DiCostanzo, Joseph; Benstead, Phil (2009). Ptaki. Encyklopedia [Birds. Encyclopedia] (in Polish). Warsaw: Wydawnictwo Naukowe PWN. ISBN 978-83-01-15733-3.
- Graszka-Petrykowski, Dariusz (2008). Ptaki w twoim ogrodzie: przegląd gatunków, dobór roślin, karmniki, pojniki, skrzynki lęgowe, kąpieliska: praktyczny przewodnik [Birds in your garden: species overview, plant selection, feeders, waterers, nest boxes, birdbaths: practical guide] (in Polish). Warsaw: Klub dla Ciebie. ISBN 978-83-7404-813-2.
- Graszka-Petrykowski, Dariusz (2005). Ptaki: profesjonalny przewodnik dla początkujących obserwatorów [Birds: professional guide for beginner observers] (in Polish). Warsaw: Klub dla Ciebie. ISBN 83-7404-128-5.
- Kruszewicz, Andrzej (2005). Ptaki Polski [Birds of Poland] (in Polish). Vol. 1. Warsaw: Multico. ISBN 83-7073-360-3.
- Radziszewski, Michał (2010). Polska. Ptaki. Encyklopedia ilustrowana [Poland. Birds. Illustrated Encyclopedia] (in Polish). Olsztyn: Carta Blanca. ISBN 978-83-7705-001-9.
