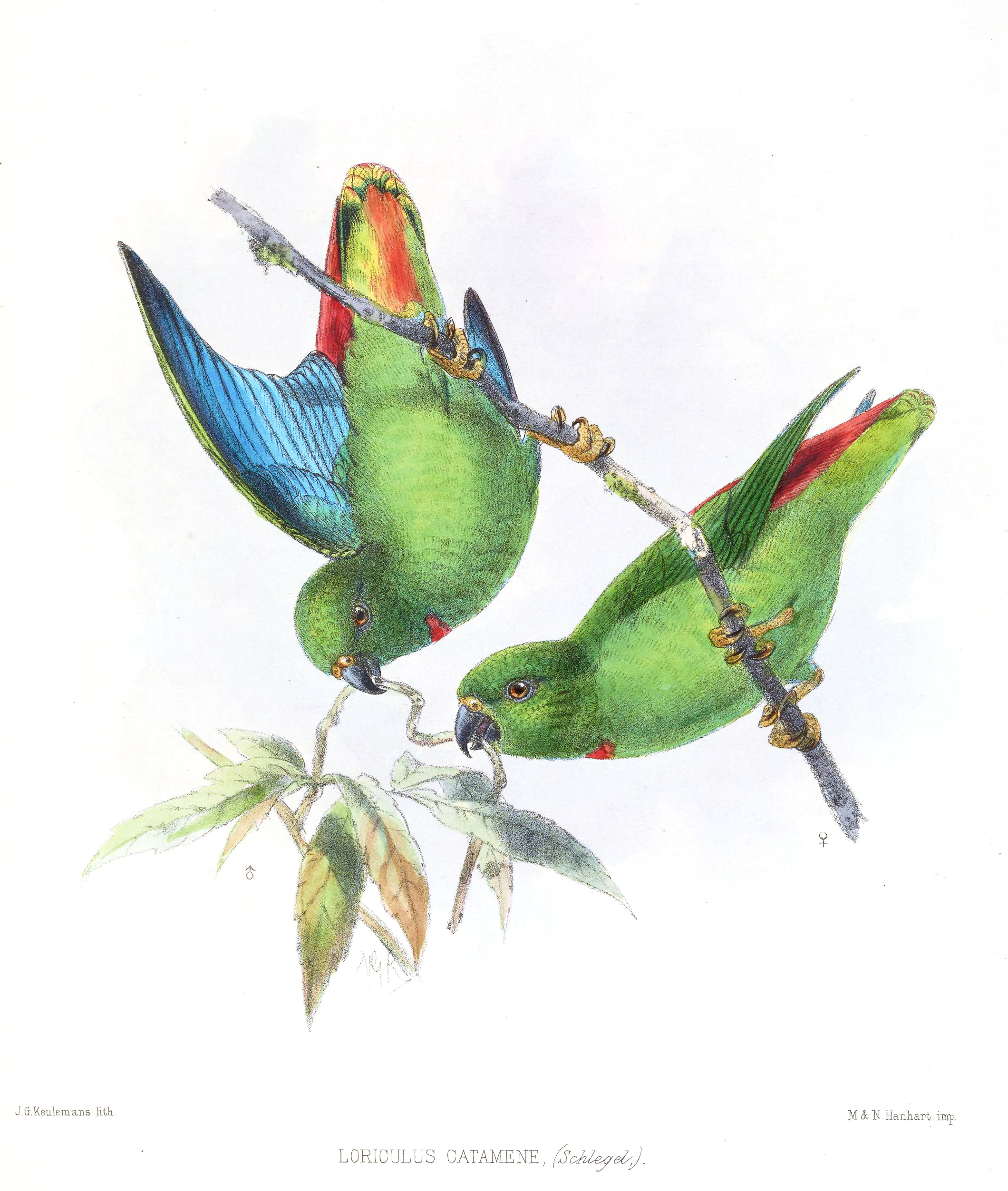

Conservation status
- Near Threatened (IUCN 3.1)

Scientific classification
- Kingdom: Animalia
- Phylum: Chordata
- Class: Aves
- Order: Psittaciformes
- Family: Psittaculidae
- Genus: Loriculus
- Species: L. catamene

Binomial name
- Loriculus catamene Schlegel, 1871

= Sangihe hanging parrot =

Species of bird

The Sangihe hanging parrot (Loriculus catamene) is a small (length: 12–13.5 cm) parrot endemic to the small island of Sangihe, north of Sulawesi, Indonesia.

This is an arboreal parrot. It is predominantly green, with a red throat patch, rump, elongated uppertail-coverts and tip of tail.

In 2009 this parrot was downlisted from Endangered to Near Threatened because although it has a very small range within which there has been extensive forest loss and fragmentation, it apparently remains common in degraded and cultivated habitats and there is no evidence of a continuing decline. The current population is estimated at between 10,000 and 46,000 individuals.

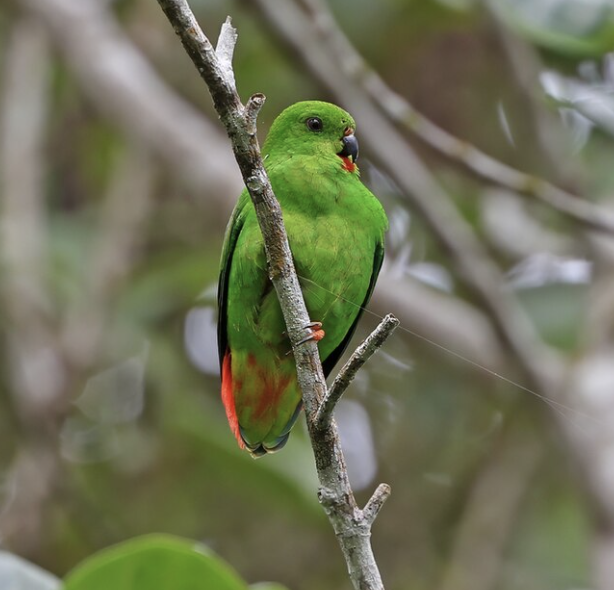
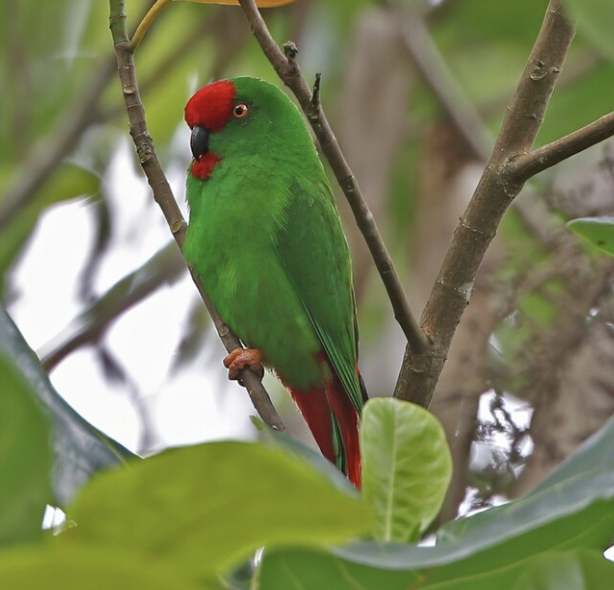
Female (left) and Male (right)
