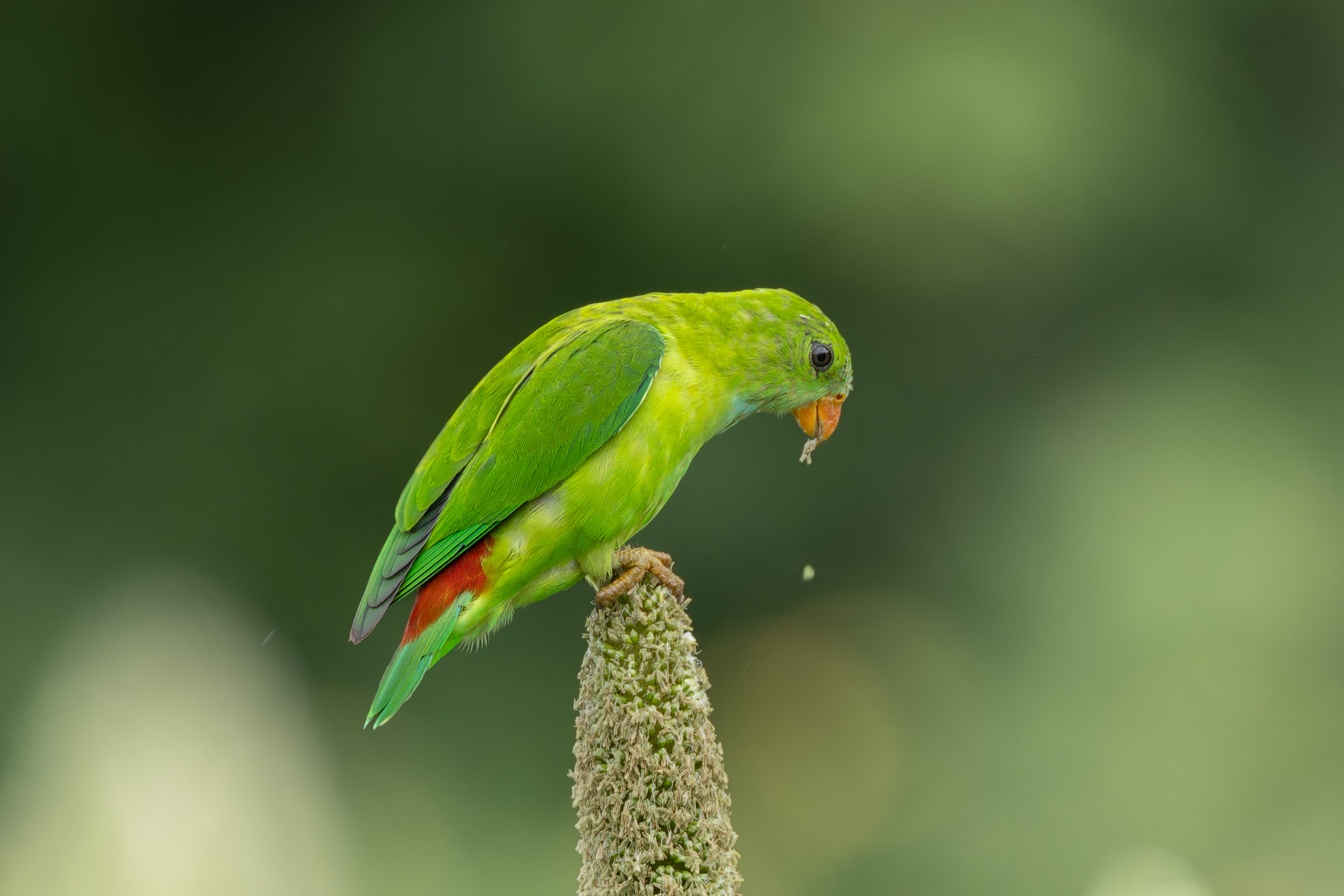
- In Saswad, Maharashtra, India.

Conservation status
- Least Concern (IUCN 3.1)

Scientific classification
- Kingdom: Animalia
- Phylum: Chordata
- Class: Aves
- Order: Psittaciformes
- Family: Psittaculidae
- Genus: Loriculus
- Species: L. vernalis

Binomial name
- Loriculus vernalis (Sparrman, 1787)

= Vernal hanging parrot =

Species of bird

The vernal hanging parrot (Loriculus vernalis) is a small parrot which is a resident breeder in the Indian subcontinent and some other areas of Southeast Asia. It undergoes local movements, driven mainly by the availability of the fruit, seeds, buds and blossoms that make up its diet. They frequent the banyan tree for the fruit and plantain trees for the nectar from the flowers.

This is a small, mainly green hanging parrot, only 14 cm long with a short tail. The adult male has a red rump and bill, and blue throat patch. The female has a green patch. Vernal hanging parrot is a bird of dry jungle and cultivation. It nests in holes in trees, laying 2-4 white eggs. Immature birds have a duller rump, and lack the throat patch. Vernal hanging parrot is less gregarious than some of its relatives, and is usually in small groups outside the breeding season. Its flight is swift and direct, and the call is a raucous chattering.

In Sri Lanka, it is replaced by the very similar endemic Sri Lanka hanging parrot, (L. beryllinus).

== Breeding ==
Vernal hanging parrots nest in tree cavities. The nests are lined with fragments of leaves. There are usually three eggs in a clutch. The eggs are white in color. The female incubates the eggs for 20 days and the chicks leave the nest about 33 days from hatching.

== Gallery ==
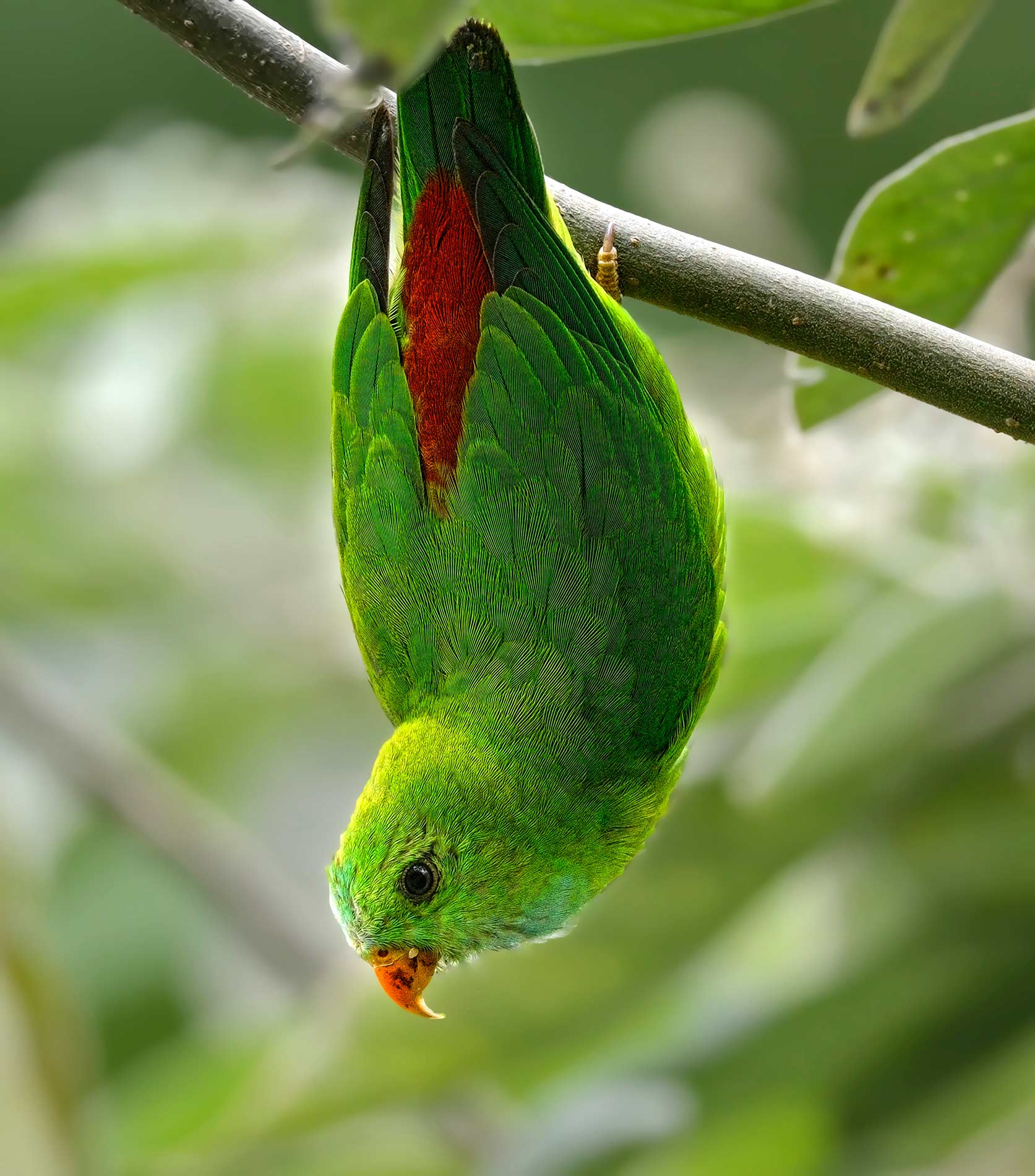
In Konkan, Maharashtra, India

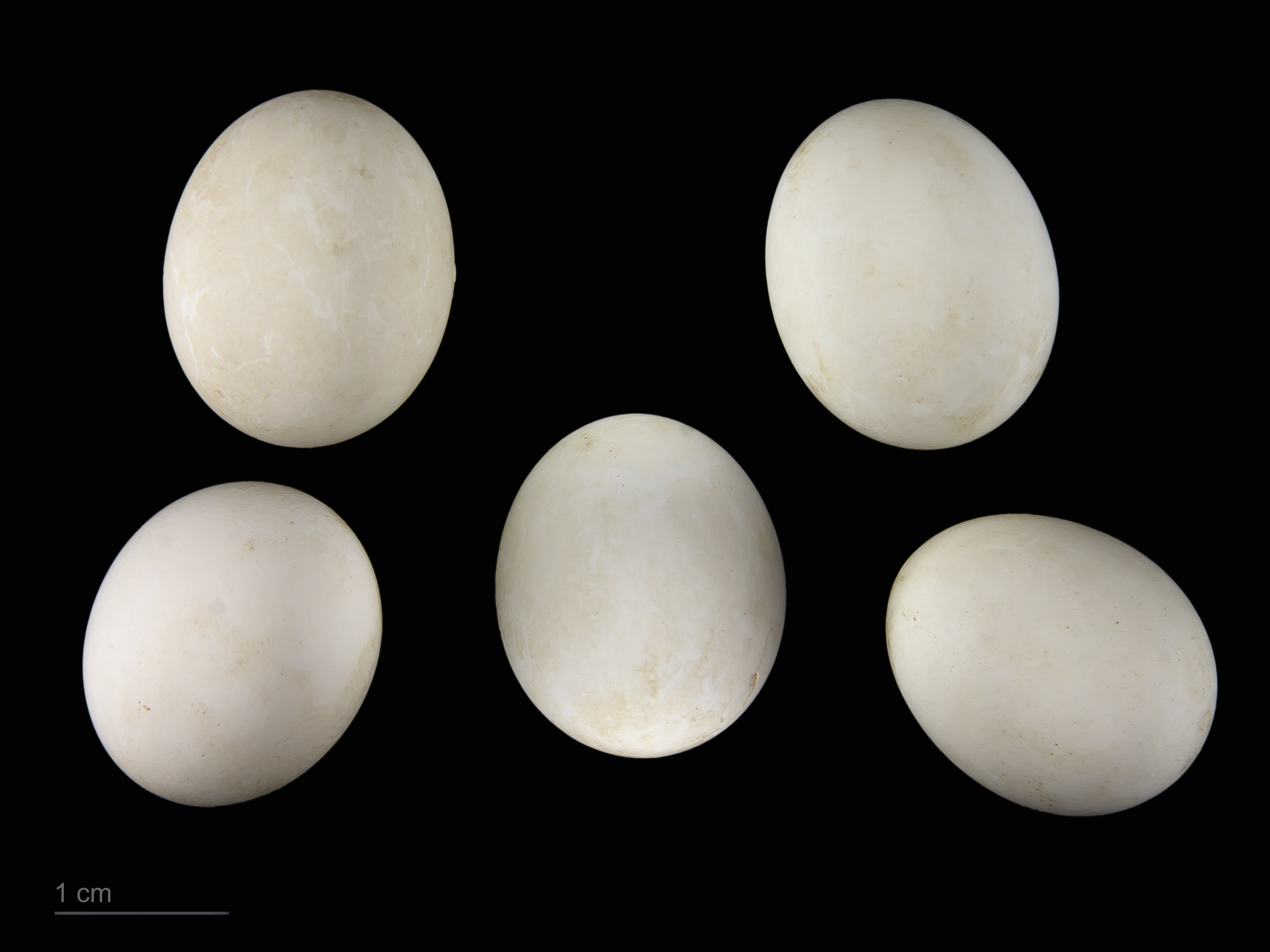
Loriculus vernalis - MHNT

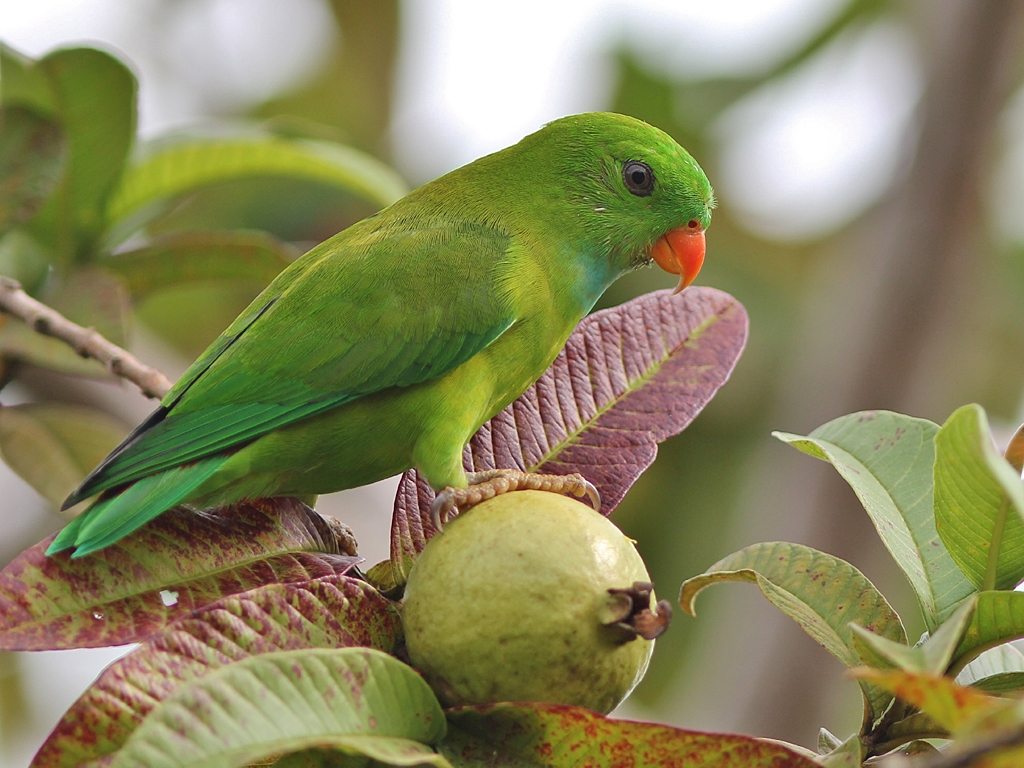
A male feasting on guava.

== Bibliography ==
- Birds of India by Grimmett, Inskipp and Inskipp, ISBN 0-691-04910-6
