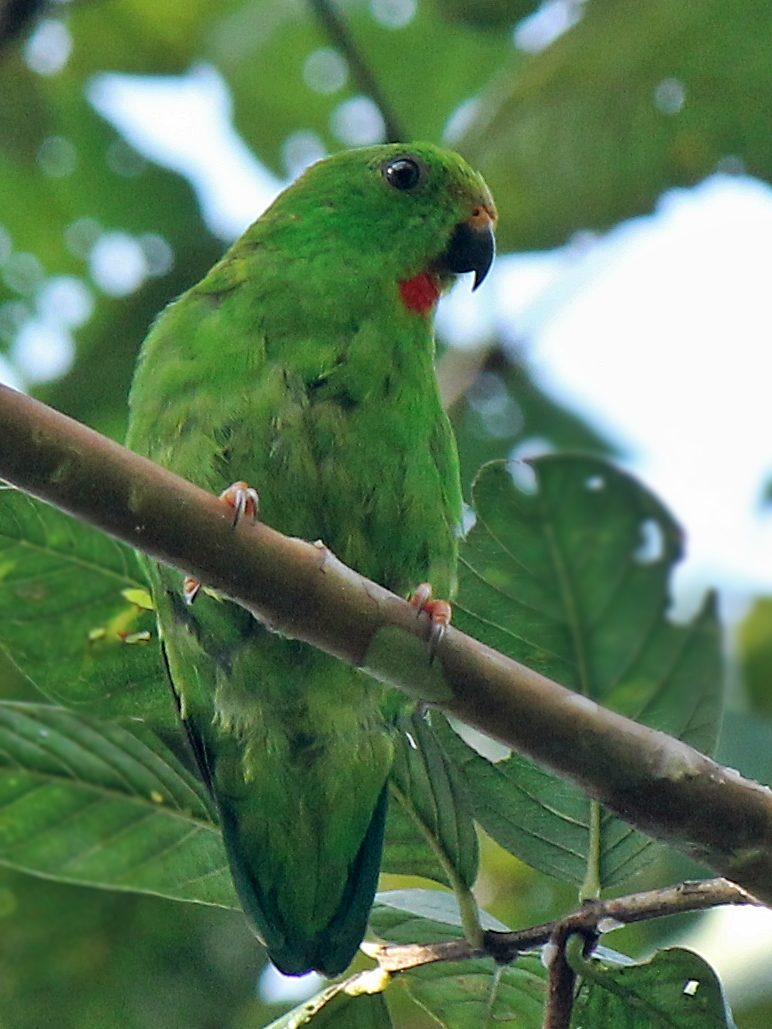
- Female Sulawesi hanging parrot at Warembungan, North Sulawesi

Conservation status
- Least Concern (IUCN 3.1)

Scientific classification
- Kingdom: Animalia
- Phylum: Chordata
- Class: Aves
- Order: Psittaciformes
- Family: Psittaculidae
- Genus: Loriculus
- Species: L. stigmatus

Binomial name
- Loriculus stigmatus (Müller, 1843)

Synonyms
- Loriculus quadricolor

= Great hanging parrot =

Species of bird

The great hanging parrot (Loriculus stigmatus), also called Celebes hanging parrot, Sulawesi hanging parrot and maroon-rumped hanging parrot, is a species of parrot in the family Psittaculidae. It is endemic to Sulawesi and nearby smaller islands in Indonesia, where it occurs in forest, secondary growth and tall mangrove.

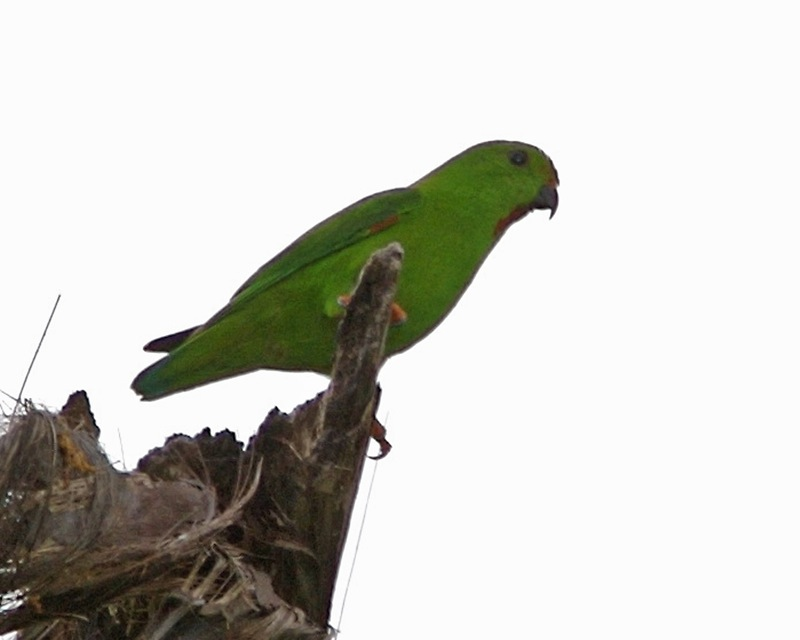
Nominate subspecies L. s. stigmatus in Sulawesi

== Description and taxonomy ==
With a total length of approximately 15 cm, it is a small parrot, but the largest species of hanging parrot. It has traditionally been considered monotypic, but recent work has re-validated the subspecies croconotus from Muna and Buton Island, and quadricolor from the Togian Islands, leaving the nominate for the population on Sulawesi itself. The plumage of the nominate is overall green with an indistinct yellowish tinge to the mantle, and a red chin, leading edge of the wing, rump and crown (the red crown is missing in females). Compared to this, L. s. croconotus has slightly paler wings and tail, and a relatively distinct yellowish tinge to the mantle, while L. s. quadricolor has a clear orange-yellow patch on the mantle, a smaller red chin-spot, and a slightly brighter red rump. Sulawesi Hanging Parrot likes to feed on fruit such as papaya and lichen.

== Breeding ==
Sulawesi Hanging parrots nest in tree cavities. There are usually three eggs in a clutch. The female incubates the eggs for 20 days and the chicks leave the nest about 33 days from hatching.
