= List of Psittaciformes by population =

This is a list of Psittaciformes species by global population. While numbers are estimates, they have been made by the experts in their fields. For more information on how these estimates were ascertained, see Wikipedia's articles on population biology and population ecology.

This list is not comprehensive, as not all Psittaciformes have had their numbers quantified. All numbers, unless explicitly stated in the notes, only count individuals in the wild; IUCN does not consider species held in captivity in its population estimates.

The IOC World Bird List (version 15.1) recognizes 406 species of Psittaciformes, 14 of which are extinct.

This list follows IUCN classifications for species names and taxonomy. Where IUCN classifications differ from other ornithological authorities, alternative names and taxonomies are noted.

Some members of Psittaciformes are extinct:

- Norfolk Island kākā (Nestor productus) - extinct by 1850s due to habitat destruction and hunting.
- Carolina parakeet (Conuropsis carolinensis) - last recorded in 1910.
- Cuban macaw (Ara tricolor) - last reported in 1885; extinct due to hunting pressures.
- Puerto Rican parakeet (Psittacara maugei) - extinct by 1892. Considered a subspecies of the Hispaniolan parakeet (P. chloropterus) by IUCN/BirdLife International.
- Mascarene parrot (Mascarinus mascarin) - last reported in 1775; extinct due to hunting pressures.
- Oceanic eclectus (Eclectus infectus) - last observed in 1793; extinct due to hunting and predation pressures.
- Seychelles parakeet (Palaeornis wardi) - last observed in 1893; extinct due to hunting pressures.
- Rodrigues parakeet, or Newton's parakeet (Psittacula exsul) - extinct by 1876, due to hunting pressures, habitat loss, and inclement weather. IUCN/BirdLife International place species in genus Alexandrinus.
- Mauritius grey parrot, or Mascarene grey parakeet (Psittacula bensoni) - extinct by end of 1750s due to deforestation. IUCN/BirdLife International place species in genus Lophopsittacus.
- Paradise parrot (Psephotellus pulcherrimus) - last observed in 1927; extinct due to drought and overgrazing.
- Black-fronted parakeet (Cyanoramphus zealandicus) - last observed in 1844; extinct due to hunting and predation pressures, deforestation.
- Raiatea parakeet (Cyanoramphus ulietanus) - likely extinct by end of 1770s due to predation by invasive species and deforestation.
- Broad-billed parrot (Lophopsittacus mauritianus) - extinct ca. 1674 due to introduced predators.
- Rodrigues parrot (Necropsittacus rodricanus) - last observed in 1761; extinct due to hunting and predation pressures, deforestation.

== Species by global population ==
Common name	Binomial name	Population	Status	Trend	Notes	Image
Glaucous macaw	Anodorhynchus glaucus	0-20	CR	?	May be extinct. Updated from "Extinct" in 2000 due to persistent unverified reports of its existence.	
New Caledonian lorikeet	Charmosyna diadema	0-49	CR	?	May be extinct. Total population, if extant, is estimated to be less than 50 individuals.	
Red-throated lorikeet	Charmosyna amabilis	0-49	CR	?	May be extinct. Last confirmed record is from 1965.	
Puerto Rican amazon	Amazona vittata	1-49	CR	▲	At least 126-139 individuals in Río Abajo subpopulation; not counted toward total population until breeding, per IUCN policy on released captive-reared birds.	
Orange-bellied parrot	Neophema chrysogaster	20-25	CR	▼	Approximately 300 individuals are currently kept in captive breeding programs.	
Imperial amazon	Amazona imperialis	40-60	CR	▼		
Night parrot	Pezoporus occidentalis	40-500	CR	▼	Best estimate for number of mature individuals is 200.	
Malherbe's parakeet	Cyanoramphus malherbi	50-249	CR	Steady	Total population is estimated to be 290-690 individuals.	
Sulu racquet-tail (Blue-winged racket-tail)	Prioniturus verticalis	100-500	CR	▼		
Kākāpō	Strigops habroptilus	116	CR	▲	Total population is 149 individuals (2018).	
Red-fronted macaw	Ara rubrogenys	134-272	CR	▼	Total population is estimated to be, at most, 600-800 individuals.	
Blue-throated macaw	Ara glaucogularis	208-303	CR	Steady	Total population is estimated to be 312-455 individuals.	
Indigo-winged parrot (Fuertes's parrot)	Hapalopsittaca fuertesi	230-300	EN	▲	Total population is estimated to be 350-450 individuals.	
Lear's macaw	Anodorhynchus leari	250-999	EN	▲	Total population is estimated to be 1,694 individuals.	
Grey-breasted parakeet	Pyrrhura griseipectus	250-999	EN	▲	Total population is estimated to be 656-866 individuals.	
El Oro parakeet	Pyrrhura orcesi	250-999	EN	▼	Total population is estimated to be 350-1,500 individuals.	
Blue-backed parrot	Tanygnathus everetti	250-999	EN	▼	Total population is estimated to be 375-1,500 individuals.	
Saint Vincent amazon	Amazona guildingii	250-999	VU	▲	Total population is estimated to be 730 individuals.	
Chatham Islands parakeet	Cyanoramphus forbesi	250-999	VU	Steady		
Yellow-faced parrotlet	Forpus xanthops	250-999	VU	Steady	Total population is estimated to be 350-1,500 individuals.	
Green racquet-tail (Green racket-tail)	Prioniturus luconensis	300-800	EN	▼		
Henderson lorikeet (Stephen's lorikeet)	Vini stepheni	360-2,000	VU	Steady	Best estimate for number of mature individuals is 500-1,000. Total population is estimated to be 554-3,014 individuals.	
Echo parakeet	Psittacula eques	400-450	VU	▲	Total population is estimated to be 756 individuals. IUCN/BirdLife International place species in genus Alexandrinus.	
Philippine cockatoo (Red-vented cockatoo)	Cacatua haematuropygia	430-750	CR	▼	Total population is estimated to be 650-1,120 individuals.	
Great green macaw	Ara ambiguus	500-1,000	CR	▼		
Scarlet-breasted lorikeet (Sunset lorikeet)	Trichoglossus forsteni	500-1,500	EN	▼		
Purple-naped lory	Lorius domicella	500-5,000	EN	▼		
Seychelles parrot (Seychelles black parrot)	Coracopsis barklyi	730-1,170	VU	Steady	Total population is estimated to be 1,392 individuals.	
Cape parrot	Poicephalus robustus	730-1,200	VU	Steady	Total population is estimated to be 1,100-1,786 individuals.	
Golden-shouldered parrot	Psephotus chrysopterygius	780-1,100	EN	▼	Best estimate for number of mature individuals is 940.	
Rimatara lorikeet (Kuhl's lorikeet)	Vini kuhlii	800	EN	Steady	Total population is estimated to be 1,220 individuals.	
Citron-crested cockatoo	Cacatua citrinocristata	800-1,320	CR	▼	Best estimate for number of mature individuals is 1,320.	
Thick-billed parrot	Rhynchopsitta pachyrhyncha	840-2,800	EN	▼		
Red-necked amazon	Amazona arausiaca	850-1,000	VU	▲	Total population is estimated to be 1,200-1,500 individuals.	
Princess parrot	Polytelis alexandrae	900-10,000	NT	Steady	Population varies greatly depending on drought conditions.	
Yellow-eared parrot	Ognorhynchus icterotis	1,000	VU	▲	Total population is estimated to be 2,600 individuals.	
Yellow-naped amazon	Amazona auropalliata	1,000-2,499	CR	▼		
Swift parrot	Lathamus discolor	1,000-2,499	CR	▼		
Ultramarine lorikeet	Vini ultramarina	1,000-2,499	CR	Steady		
Vinaceous-breasted amazon	Amazona vinacea	1,000-2,499	EN	▼	Total population is estimated to be 2,000-2,700 individuals.	
Sun parakeet	Aratinga solstitialis	1,000-2,499	EN	▼		
Sumba eclectus	Eclectus cornelia	1,000-2,499	EN	▼		
Maroon-fronted parrot	Rhynchopsitta terrisi	1,000-2,499	EN	▼	Total population is estimated to be 3,500 individuals.	
Comoro parrot (Comoro black parrot)	Coracopsis sibilans	1,000-2,499	NT	▼	Total populstion is estimated to be 1,500-3,800 individuals.	
Saint Lucia amazon	Amazona versicolor	1,150-1,500	VU	▲	Total population is estimated to be 1,750-2,250 individuals.	
Red-faced parrot	Hapalopsittaca pyrrhops	1,200-1,600	EN	▼	Total population is estimated to be 1,800-2,400 individuals.	
Yellow-crested cockatoo	Cacatua sulphurea	1,200-2,000	CR	▼	Total population is estimated to be 1,800-3,140 individuals.	
Hispaniolan parakeet	Psittacara chloropterus	1,500-7,000	VU	▼	Total population is estimated to be 2,500-9,999 individuals.	
Cuban parakeet	Psittacara euops	1,500-7,000	VU	▼	Total population is estimated to be 2,500-9,999 individuals.	
Blue-naped parrot	Tanygnathus lucionensis	1,500-7,000	NT	▼	Total population is estimated to be 2,500-9,999 individuals.	
Ouvea parakeet	Eunymphicus uvaeensis	1,700	VU	▲		
Santa Marta parakeet	Pyrrhura viridicata	1,800-3,200	EN	▼	Total population is estimated to be 2,900-4,800 individuals.	
Antipodes parakeet	Cyanoramphus unicolor	2,000-3,000	VU	Steady		
Red-crowned amazon	Amazona viridigenalis	2,000-4,300	EN	▼	Total population is estimated to be 3,000-6,500 individuals; this population is considered outdated.	
Military macaw	Ara militaris	2,000-7,000	VU	▼	Total population is estimated to be 3,000-10,000 individuals.	
Red-and-blue lory	Eos histrio	2,400-43,200	EN	▼	Best estimate for number of mature individuals in 2,400-8,400.	
Baudin's black cockatoo	Zanda baudinii	2,500-4,500	CR	▼	Best estimate for number of mature individuals in 3,250. Total population is estimated to be 5,000-8,000 individuals.	
Red-browed amazon	Amazona rhodocorytha	2,500-9,999	VU	▼		
Flores hanging parrot (Wallace's hanging parrot)	Loriculus flosculus	2,500-9,999	VU	▼	Total population is estimated to be 3,500-15,000 individuals.	
New Zealand kaka	Nestor meridionalis	2,500-9,999	VU	▼	Total population is estimated to be 3,750-14,999 individuals.	
White-breasted parakeet	Pyrrhura albipectus	2,500-9,999	VU	▼		
Ochre-marked parakeet	Pyrrhura cruentata	2,500-9,999	VU	▼	Total population is estimated to be 3,500-15,000 individuals.	
White-eared parakeet	Pyrrhura leucotis	2,500-9,999	VU	▼		
Black-lored parrot	Tanygnathus gramineus	2,500-9,999	VU	▼		
Golden-tailed parrotlet	Touit surdus	2,500-9,999	VU	▼		
Biak lorikeet	Trichoglossus rosenbergii	2,500-9,999	VU	▼	Best estimate for number of mature individuals is 3,000-4,000 individuals.	
Yellow-shouldered amazon	Amazona barbadensis	2,500-9,999	NT	▼		
Rusty-faced parrot	Hapalopsittaca amazonina	2,500-9,999	NT	▼		
Cliff parakeet	Myiopsitta luchsi	2,500-9,999	NT	▼		
Red-masked parakeet	Psittacara erythrogenys	2,500-9,999	NT	▼	Total population is estimated to be less than 10,000 individuals.	
Brown-backed parrotlet	Touit melanonotus	2,500-9,999	NT	▼		
Bismarck hanging parrot	Loriculus tener	2,500-9,999	LC	▼	Total population is estimated to be 10,000 - 15,000 individuals.	
Amazonian parrotlet (Manu parrotlet)	Nannopsittaca dachilleae	2,500-9,999	LC	▼		
Mindanao lorikeet	Saudareos johnstoniae	2,500-20,000	NT	▼	IUCN/BirdLife International place species in genus Trichoglossus.	
Mindanao racquet-tail (Mindanao racket-tail)	Prioniturus waterstradti	3,000-4,500	NT	▼	Total population is estimated to be 4,000-5,000 individuals.	
Crimson shining parrot	Prosopeia splendens	3,000-5,000	NT	?	Best estimate for number of mature individuals is 4,000. Total population is estimated to be 6,000 individuals.	
Red-fronted parrotlet	Touit costaricensis	3,000-12,000	NT	▼	Total population is estimated to be 4,500-18,000 individuals.	
Brown-breasted parakeet (Flame-winged parakeet)	Pyrrhura calliptera	3,300-6,700	VU	▼	Total population is estimated to be 5,000-10,000 individuals.	
Simeulue parrot	Psittinus abbotti	3,300-31,000	NT	▼	Best estimate for number of mature individuals is 10,000-20,000. Total population is estimated to be 5,000-47,000 individuals.	
Kea	Nestor notabilis	4,000	EN	▼	Total population is estimated to be 6,000 individuals.	
Montane racquet-tail (Montane racket-tail)	Prioniturus montanus	4,000-12,000	NT	▼	Total population is estimated to be 7,100-14,300 individuals.	
Blue lorikeet	Vini peruviana	4,300-6,300	VU	▼	Best estimate for number of mature individuals is 5,300. Total population is estimated to be 6,500-9,400 individuals.	
Yellow-headed amazon	Amazona oratrix	4,700	EN	▼	Total population is estimated to be 7,000 individuals. Estimate dates from 1994.	
Lilac-crowned amazon	Amazona finschi	4,700-6,700	EN	▼	Total population is estimated to be 7,000-10,000 individuals.	
Hyacinth macaw	Anodorhynchus hyacinthinus	4,700-11,000	VU	Steady		
Horned parakeet	Eunymphicus cornutus	5,000-8,000	VU	▼		
Jonquil parrot	Aprosmictus jonquillaceus	5,000-20,000	NT	▼		
Palm lorikeet	Vini palmarum	5,000-20,000	LC	▼	IUCN/Bird Life International place species in genus Charmosyna.	
Spot-winged parrotlet	Touit stictopterus	5,000-21,000	NT	▼		
Sangihe hanging parrot	Loriculus catamene	5,000-37,000	NT	▼	Total population is estimated to be 10,700-46,200 individuals.	
Red-tailed amazon	Amazona brasiliensis	6,000-6,700	NT	▲	Total population is estimated to be 9,000-10,000 individuals.	
Black-billed amazon	Amazona agilis	6,000-15,000	EN	▼	Total population is estimated to be 10,000-19,999 individuals.	
Yellow-billed amazon	Amazona collaria	6,000-15,000	VU	▼	Total population is estimated to be 10,000-19,999 individuals.	
Tucumán amazon	Amazona tucumana	6,000-15,000	VU	▼	Total population is estimated to be 10,000-19,999 individuals.	
Hispaniolan amazon	Amazona ventralis	6,000-15,000	VU	▼	Total population is estimated to be 10,000-19,999 individuals.	
Nyasa lovebird (Lilian's lovebird)	Agapornis lilianae	6,000-15,000	NT	▼	Total population is estimated to be 10,000-19,999 individuals.	
Nicobar parakeet	Psittacula caniceps	6,000-15,000	NT	▼	Total population is estimated to be 10,000-19,999 individuals.	
Blue-cheeked amazon	Amazona dufresniana	6,000-61,000	NT	▼		
Tanimbar eclectus	Eclectus riedeli	6,600-10,000	VU	▼	Total population is estimated to be 10,000-15,000 individuals.	
Golden parakeet	Guaruba guarouba	6,600-13,400	VU	▼	Total population is estimated to be 10,000-19,999 individuals.	
Bald parrot	Pyrilia aurantiocephala	6,700	NT	▼	Total population is estimated to be at least 10,000 individuals.	
Glossy black cockatoo	Calyptorhynchus lathami	7,000-14,000	VU	▼	Divided into three subspecies: C. l. lathami (7,500 individuals), C. l. halmaturinus (250), and C. l. erebus (2,000).	
Golden-plumed parakeet	Leptosittaca branickii	7,300-20,000	LC	▼	Total population is estimated to be 11,000-30,000 individuals.	
Moluccan eclectus	Eclectus roratus	7,300-51,000	LC	▼		
Blue-winged parrot	Neophema chrysostoma	7,500-15,000	VU	▼	Best estimate for number of mature individuals is 10,000.	
Iris lorikeet	Saudareos iris	7,500-20,000	NT	▼	IUCN/BirdLife International place species in genus Trichoglossus.	
Black-cheeked lovebird	Agapornis nigrigenis	8,000-11,500	VU	▼	Total population is estimated to be 9,500-11,500 individuals.	
Mindoro racquet-tail (Mindoro racket-tail)	Prioniturus mindorensis	8,000-25,000	VU	▼		
Blue-headed macaw	Primolius couloni	9,200-46,000	VU	▼		
Grey-cheeked parakeet	Brotogeris pyrrhoptera	10,000	VU	▼	Total population is estimated to be 15,000 individuals.	
Blue-winged macaw	Primolius maracana	>10,000	LC	Steady	No exact population estimate is given, but population is expected to "comfortably exceed 10,000 mature individuals."	
Blue-eared lory	Eos semilarvata	10,000-19,999	NT	▼	Total population (assuming all suitable habitat is occupied) is estimated to be 23,800-25,500 individuals.	
Jamaican parakeet (Olive-throated parakeet)	Eupsittula nana	10,000-19,999	NT	▼		
Saffron-headed parrot	Pyrilia pyrilia	10,000-19,999	NT	▼		
Superb parrot	Polytelis swainsonii	10,000-19,999	LC	▲		
Blue-bellied parrot	Triclaria malachitacea	10,000-19,999	LC	▼		
Yellow-fronted parakeet (Yellow-crowned parakeet)	Cyanoramphus auriceps	10,000-30,000	NT	▼		
Black-winged lory	Eos cyanogenia	11,743-67,386	NT	▼	Values given are 25-75th percentile range, applying population densities for congenerics (Eos sp.) across its range.	
Goias parakeet (Pfrimer's parakeet)	Pyrrhura pfrimeri	12,000-20,000	EN	▼	Best estimate for number of mature individuals is 16,000. Total population is estimated to be 18,000-30,000 individuals.	
Red-spectacled amazon	Amazona pretrei	15,600	VU	Steady	Total population is estimated to be 22,300 individuals.	
Cuban amazon	Amazona leucocephala	16,000-27,000	NT	▼	Total population is estimated to be 24,242-40,268 individuals.	
Red-fronted parakeet (Red-crowned parakeet)	Cyanoramphus novaezelandiae	16,500-35,300	LC	▼	Total population is estimated to be 24,700-53,000 individuals. Note that IOC taxonomy splits four additional species, the Norfolk parakeet (C. cookii), New Caledonian parakeet (C. saisseti), Lord Howe parakeet (C. subflavescens), and Reischek's parakeet (C. hochstetteri) from this one. IUCN/BirdLife International maintain all five species within C. novaezelandiae.	
Gang-gang cockatoo	Callocephalon fimbriatum	17,600-35,200	VU	▼	Best estimate for number of mature individuals is 25,300.	
Turquoise parrot	Neophema pulchella	20,000	LC	Steady	Value given is for total population.	
Hooded parrot	Psephotus dissimilis	20,000	LC	Steady	Value given is for total population.	
Rufous-fronted parakeet	Bolborhynchus ferrugineifrons	20,000-49,999	VU	▼	Total population is estimated to be approximately 60,000 individuals.	
Pesquet's parrot	Psittrichas fulgidus	20,000-49,999	VU	▼		
Mexican parrotlet	Forpus cyanopygius	20,000-49,999	NT	▼		
Yellow-lored amazon (Yucatan amazon)	Amazona xantholora	20,000-49,999	LC	▼		
Salvadori's fig parrot	Psittaculirostris salvadorii	20,000-49,999	LC	▼	Total population is estimated to be 30,000-75,000 individuals.	
Sulphur-winged parakeet	Pyrrhura hoffmanni	20,000-49,999	LC	Steady		
Carnaby's black cockatoo	Zanda latirostris	20,000-52,000	EN	▼	Best estimate for number of mature individuals is 34,000.	
Salmon-crested cockatoo	Cacatua moluccensis	20,000-62,000	EN	▼	Best estimate for number of mature individuals is 26,000-53,000. Total population is estimated to be 33,000-77,000 individuals.	
Regent parrot	Polytelis anthopeplus	21,500	LC	▼	Values given are for total population, divided by subspecies: P. a. anthopeplusis (20,000) and P. a. monarchoides (1,500).	
Yellow-tailed black cockatoo	Zanda funerea	> 25,000	LC	Steady	Value given is for total population.	
Diademed amazon	Amazona diadema	30,000-74,000	LC	▼	Total population is estimated to be 46,000 - 110,000 individuals.	
Chattering lory	Lorius garrulus	30,000-200,000	VU	▼		
Yellowish-breasted racquet-tail (Yellow-breasted racket-tail)	Prioniturus flavicans	40,000-95,000	NT	▼	Total population is estimated to be 59,000-143,000 individuals.	
Masked shining parrot	Prosopeia personata	40,000-100,000	NT	▼	Total population is estimated to be 65,605-108,270 individuals.	
White cockatoo	Cacatua alba	43,000-183,000	EN	▼	Estimate dates from 1993.	
Brown lory	Chalcopsitta duivenbodei	>50,000	LC	▼	Value given is for total population.	
Pohnpei lorikeet	Trichoglossus rubiginosus	50,000-99,999	NT	▼	Total population is estimated to be 100,803 individuals.	
Red-and-green macaw	Ara chloropterus	50,000-499,999	LC	▼		
Scarlet macaw	Ara macao	50,000-499,999	LC	▼		
Barred parakeet	Bolborhynchus lineola	50,000-499,999	LC	Steady		
Spectacled parrotlet	Forpus conspicillatus	50,000-499,999	LC	▼		
White-crowned parrot	Pionus senilis	50,000-499,999	LC	▼		
Brown-hooded parrot	Pyrilia haematotis	50,000-499,999	LC	▼		
Blue-eyed cockatoo	Cacatua ophthalmica	87,000-378,000	VU	▼	Total population is estimated to be 131,000 - 568,000 individuals.	
Burrowing parrot	Cyanoliseus patagonus	95,000	LC	▼		
Red-tailed black cockatoo	Calyptorhynchus banksii	>100,000	LC	▼	Value given is for total population.	
Timneh parrot	Psittacus timneh	100,000-499,999	EN	▼	Population likely lies toward lower band of estimate.	
Tanimbar corella	Cacatua goffiniana	100,000-499,999	NT	▼	Values given are for total population.	
Long-billed corella	Cacatua tenuirostris	100,000-499,999	LC	▲	Values given are for total population.	
Ground parrot	Pezoporus wallicus	100,000-499,999	LC	Steady		
Black-capped parakeet	Pyrrhura rupicola	100,000-499,999	LC	Steady		
Blue-streaked lory	Eos reticulata	112,000-182,000	NT	▼	Total population is estimated to be 168,000-272,000 individuals.	
Green parakeet	Psittacara holochlorus	200,000	LC	▼	Note that IOC taxonomy splits two additional species, the Socorro parakeet (P. brevipes) and Pacific parakeet (P. streneus) from this one. IUCN/BirdLife International maintain all three species within P. holochlorus.	
Caica parrot	Pyrilia caica	250,000	LC	▼		
Palm cockatoo	Probosciger aterrimus	260,000-640,000	NT	▼		
Fischer's lovebird	Agapornis fischeri	290,000-1,002,000	NT	▼	Values given are for total population.	
Orange-fronted parakeet	Eupsittula canicularis	500,000-4,999,999	VU	▼		
White-fronted amazon	Amazona albifrons	500,000-4,999,999	LC	▲	Values given are for total population.	
Orange-chinned parakeet	Brotogeris jugularis	500,000-4,999,999	LC	▼		
Crimson-fronted parakeet (Finsch's parakeet)	Psittacara finschi	500,000-4,999,999	LC	Steady		
Grey parrot	Psittacus erithacus	560,000-12,700,000	EN	▼	Values represent a preliminary, coarse estimate for total population.	
Papuan eclectus	Eclectus polychloros	990,000-1,100,000	LC	▼		
Turquoise-fronted amazon (Blue-fronted amazon)	Amazona aestiva	1,000,000-10,000,000	NT	▼		
Brown-throated parakeet	Eupsittula pertinax	5,000,000-49,999,999	LC	Steady		
Blue-headed parrot	Pionus menstruus	5,000,000-49,999,999	LC	Steady		
Monk parakeet	Myiopsitta monachus	20,000,000	LC	▲	IUCN/BirdLife International do not report a population estimate. Reported value comes from Partners in Flight database, and include introduced populations.	

== Species without population estimates ==
Common name	Binomial name	Population	Status	Trend	Notes	Image
Spix's macaw	Cyanopsitta spixii	unknown	EW	N/A	Last known wild individual disappeared in 2000. A number of C. spixii are still alive in captivity, but IUCN/BirdLife International do not provide a population estimate.	
Blue-fronted lorikeet	Charmosyna toxopei	unknown	DD	?	Very small, or moderately large populations are possible given the difficulty of surveying this species. No confirmed observations since 2014.	
Blue-headed racquet-tail (Blue-headed racket-tail)	Prioniturus platenae	unknown	VU	▼		
Pearly parakeet	Pyrrhura lepida	unknown	VU	▼		
White-naped lory	Lorius albidinucha	unknown	NT	?		
Red-lored amazon	Amazona autumnalis	unknown	LC	▼		
Southern mealy amazon	Amazona farinosa	unknown	LC	▼		
Golden-capped parakeet	Aratinga auricapillus	unknown	LC	▼		
Solomons corella	Cacatua ducorpsii	unknown	LC	▼		
Sulphur-crested cockatoo	Cacatua galerita	unknown	LC	▼		
Pink cockatoo	Cacatua leadbeateri	unknown	LC	Steady		
Western corella	Cacatua pastinator	unknown	LC	▲		
Little corella	Cacatua sanguinea	unknown	LC	▲		
Galah	Eolophus roseicapilla	unknown	LC	▲		
Budgerigar	Melopsittacus undulatus	unknown	LC	▲		
Cockatiel	Nymphicus hollandicus	unknown	LC	Steady		
Niam-niam parrot	Poicephalus crassus	unknown	LC	▼		
Brown-headed parrot	Poicephalus cryptoxanthus	unknown	LC	▼		
Yellow-fronted parrot	Poicephalus flavifrons	unknown	LC	▼		
Brown-necked parrot	Poicephalus fuscicollis	unknown	LC	▼		
Red-fronted parrot	Poicephalus gulielmi	unknown	LC	▼		
Brown parrot (Meyer's parrot)	Poicephalus meyeri	unknown	LC	Steady		
Rüppell's parrot	Poicephalus rueppellii	unknown	LC	▼		
Red-bellied parrot	Poicephalus rufiventris	unknown	LC	Steady		
Senegal parrot	Poicephalus senegalus	unknown	LC	▼		
Lilac-tailed parrotlet	Touit batavicus	unknown	LC	▼		
Blue-fronted parrotlet	Touit dilectissimus	unknown	LC	▼		
Scarlet-shouldered parrotlet	Touit huetii	unknown	LC	▼		
Sapphire-rumped parrotlet	Touit purpuratus	unknown	LC	▼		

== See also ==
- Lists of birds by population
- Lists of organisms by population
