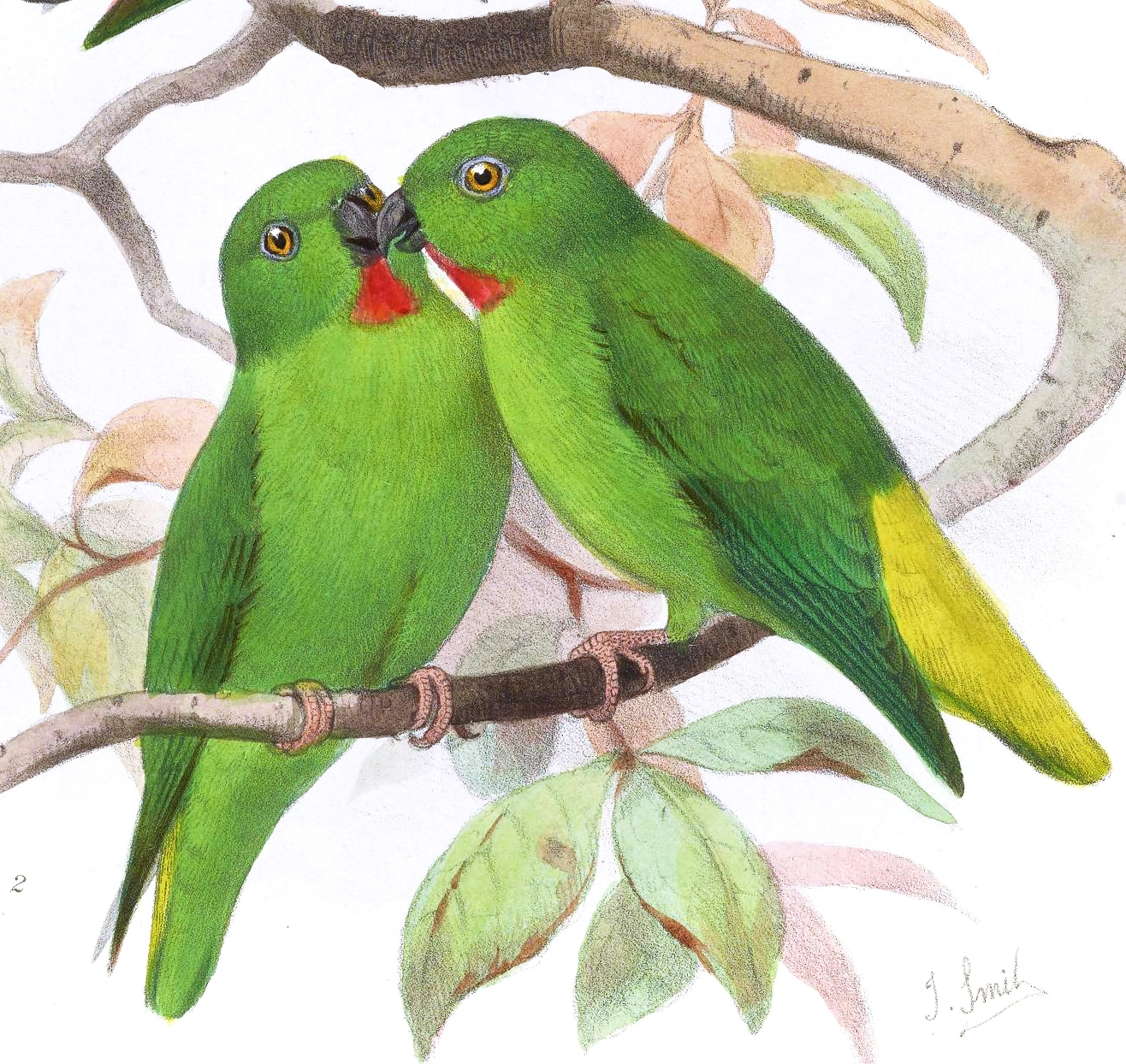
- Two females

Conservation status
- Least Concern (IUCN 3.1)

Scientific classification
- Kingdom: Animalia
- Phylum: Chordata
- Class: Aves
- Order: Psittaciformes
- Family: Psittaculidae
- Genus: Loriculus
- Species: L. tener

Binomial name
- Loriculus tener Sclater, PL, 1877

= Bismarck hanging parrot =

Species of bird

The Bismarck hanging parrot or green-fronted hanging parrot (Loriculus tener) is a small species of parrot in the family Psittaculidae. It is endemic to forest in the Bismarck Archipelago in Papua New Guinea. It is threatened by habitat loss. It is sometimes considered a subspecies of the orange-fronted hanging parrot.

== Description ==
Both sexes feature a mainly green body with a bright red patch on its throat, a black beak, and yellow eyes. Males have a yellow/green rump with a yellow tail. Females feature green cheeks (along with males) but, have a slight green/blue wash. Juvenile birds have no throat patches, and have a brown beak and eyes.

== Distribution and habitat ==
The Bismarck hanging parrot can be found on islands in the Bismarck Archipelago. It is present on most coastal and lowland areas of New Britain and New Ireland, as it tends to avoid the central highland areas. It can also be found throughout the Duke of York Islands, New Hanover Island, Manne Island, Selapiu Island, Tsoilaunung Island, Patio Island, and other surrounding smaller islands. It is found in lowland rainforest at altitudes of up to 500 meters, but prefers to live in areas less than 200 meters in elevation.

== Behaviour and ecology ==
It is quite shy and is usually hidden from plain sight. It tends to interact with other species of the Loriculus genus. It is usually found in small groups of 2 to 4 individual birds. Females usually lay a clutch of 3 to 4 eggs. Its diet consists of various wild fruits, flowers, buds, and it will sometimes consume small insect larva (for extra protein sustenance). It has an estimated wild population of approximately 15,000 to 30,000 birds.

== Threats ==
Like many other birds in the Bismarck Archipelago, the Bismarck hanging parrot is threatened by deforestation, encroaching human settlement, mining operations, and illegal logging. It was classified as Near threatened by the IUCN from 2004-2018, but was downgraded to Least concern in 2021.
