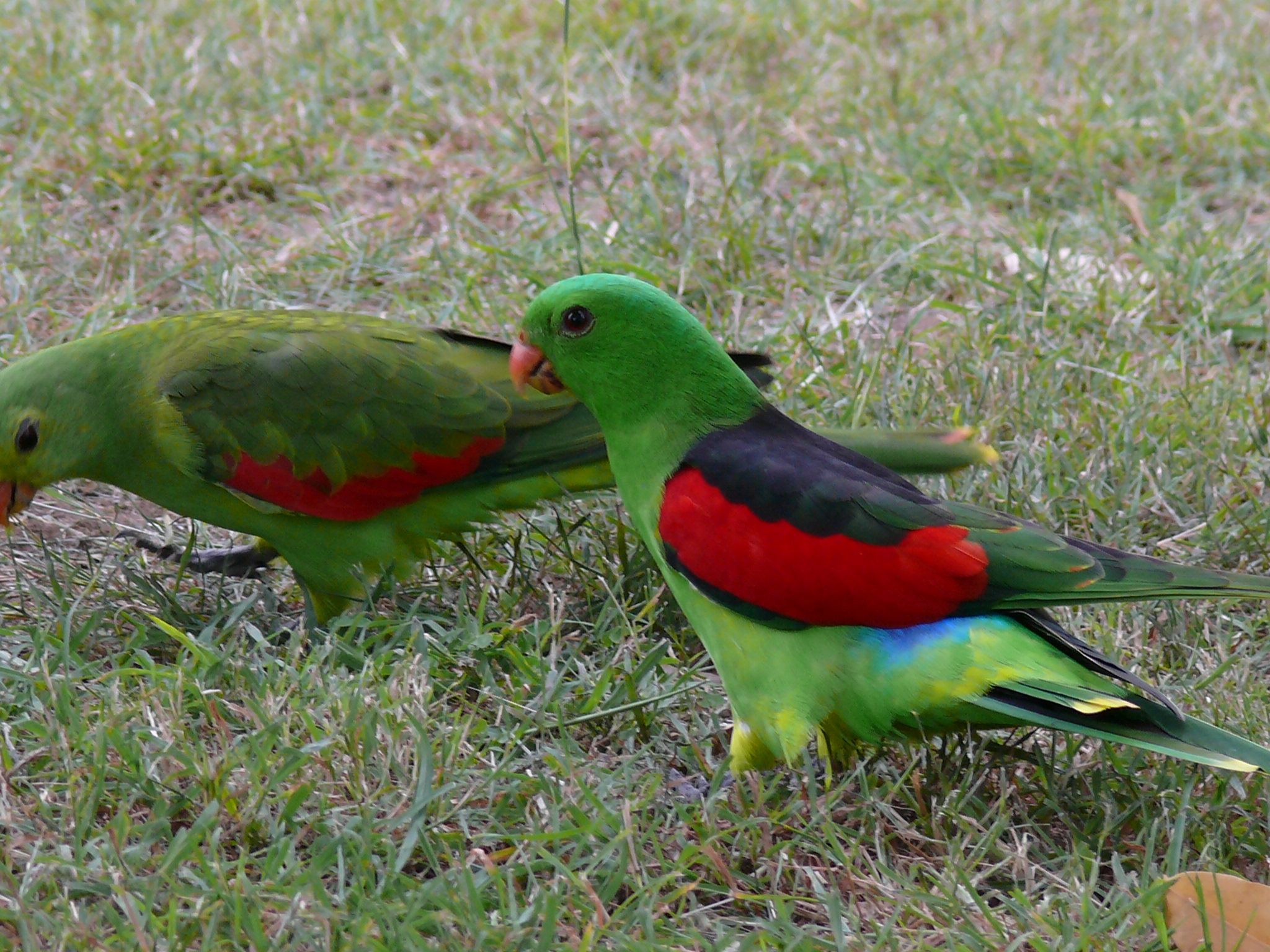
- A pair (female on left and male on right)

Conservation status
- Least Concern (IUCN 3.1)

Scientific classification
- Kingdom: Animalia
- Phylum: Chordata
- Class: Aves
- Order: Psittaciformes
- Family: Psittaculidae
- Genus: Aprosmictus
- Species: A. erythropterus

Binomial name
- Aprosmictus erythropterus (Gmelin, 1788)
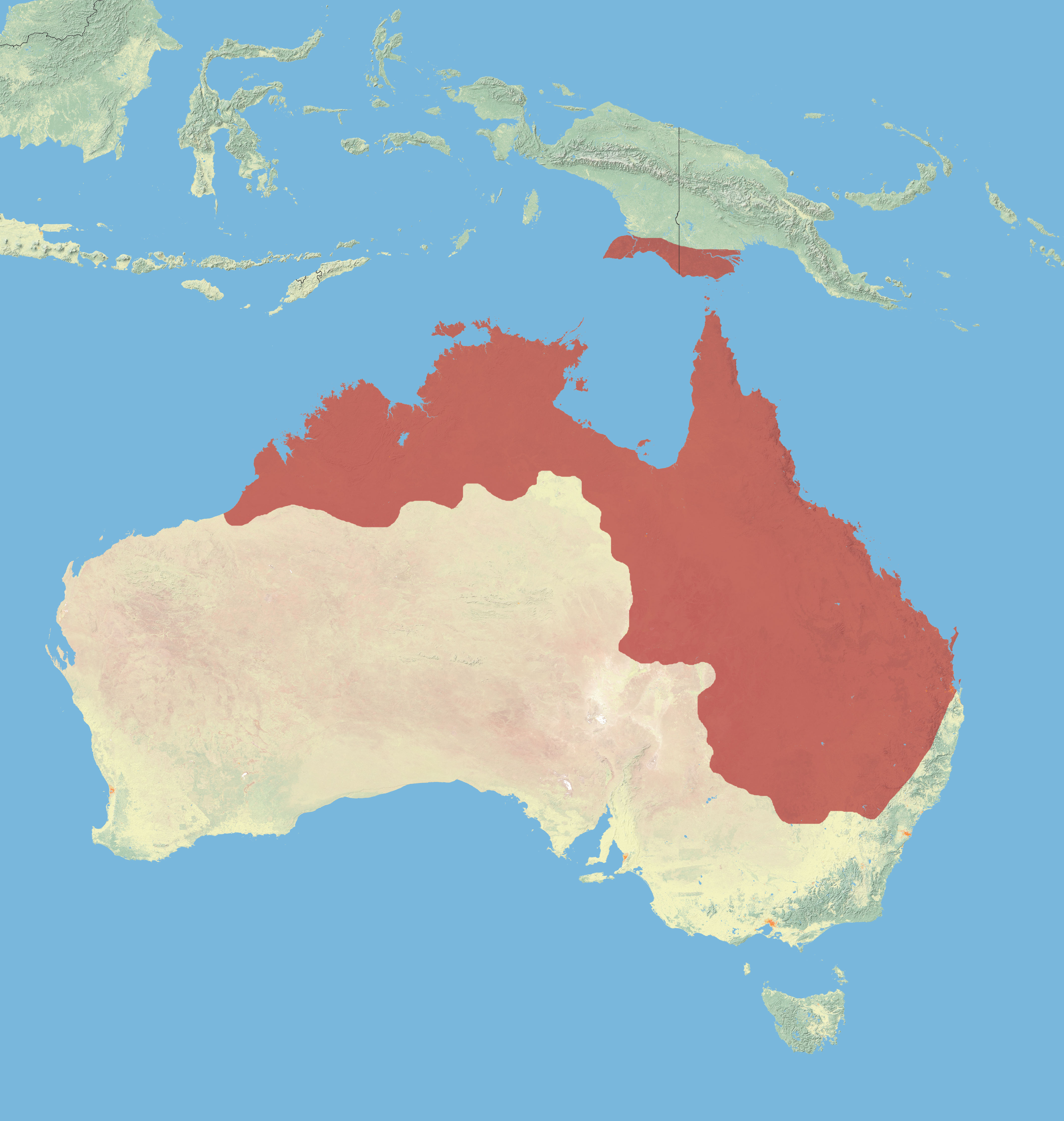
- Distribution of the red-winged parrot

Synonyms
- Psittacus erythropterus

= Red-winged parrot =

Species of bird

The red-winged parrot (Aprosmictus erythropterus) is a parrot native to Australia and New Guinea. It is found in grasslands, savannah, farmland, and woodland.

== Taxonomy ==
The red-winged parrot was formally described in 1788 by the German naturalist Johann Friedrich Gmelin in his revised and expanded edition of Carl Linnaeus's Systema Naturae. He placed it with all the other parrots in the genus Psittacus and coined the binomial name Psittacus erythropterus. Gmelin based his description on the "crimson-winged parrot" that had been described in 1781 by the English ornithologist John Latham in his A General Synopsis of Birds. The red-winged parrot is now placed with the jonquil parrot in the genus Aprosmictus that was introduced in 1842 by the English ornithologist John Gould. The genus name is from the Ancient Greek απροσμικτος/aprosmiktos meaning "unsociable" or "solitary". The specific epithet erythropterus combines the Ancient Greek ερυθρος/eruthros meaning "red" with -πτερος/-pteros meaning "-winged. Alternative common names include crimson-winged parrot and blood-winged parrot.

Two subspecies are recognised:

- A. e. coccineopterus (Gould, 1865) – Trans-Fly (south-central New Guinea) and Kimberley region, northeast Northern Territory to Cape York Peninsula, northeast Queensland (north Australia)
- A. e. erythropterus (Gmelin, JF, 1788) – east-central Queensland to central New South Wales (east-central Australia)

Naturally occurring hybrids with the Australian king parrot (Alisterus scapularis) have been recorded from Bell in southeastern Queensland.

== Description ==
The red-winged parrot is typically about 30 to 33 cm (12 to 13 in) in length. Both sexes have bright red wings and a bright green body. The male birds have a black nape, lower blue back and rump with a yellow tip on their tail, an orange bill and grey feet. The female birds have a yellowish-green body and the wings have red and pink trimmings. Also distinguishing the females are dark irises and the lower back is a light blue colour. Juveniles have orange/yellow beaks and pale brown irises, and otherwise resemble females in colouration. Males develop adult plumage at about the age of two years and females at the age of about a year and a half.

== Distribution and habitat ==
Their range is from the Pilbara, Western Australia to Cape York Peninsula, Queensland (to be seen almost all over Queensland) and as south as northeast South Australia. They are occasionally spotted in south New Guinea. These birds inhabit riverine forests, forest edges, acacia scrub, savanna, mangroves, and farmlands. They are seen often in pairs or flocks near water.

== Behaviour ==
=== Breeding ===
The birds typically breed in spring and summer, but breeding times depends on their location. A hollow space in a tree at a height of 11 m (36 ft) from the ground usually acts as nest for breeding . Generally, three to six white eggs are laid per season, the eggs being 31 mm (1.2 in) in length. The female incubates while the male searches for food. The chicks stay with their parents for about five weeks. It has been hybridised with the Australian king parrot. The hybrid is fertile and breeds true to form.

=== Food and feeding ===
Their diet typical consists of seeds from eucalyptus, acacia, berries, flowers, and insects. The birds' call are ching-ching, chink-chink or thin screeching.

== Gallery ==
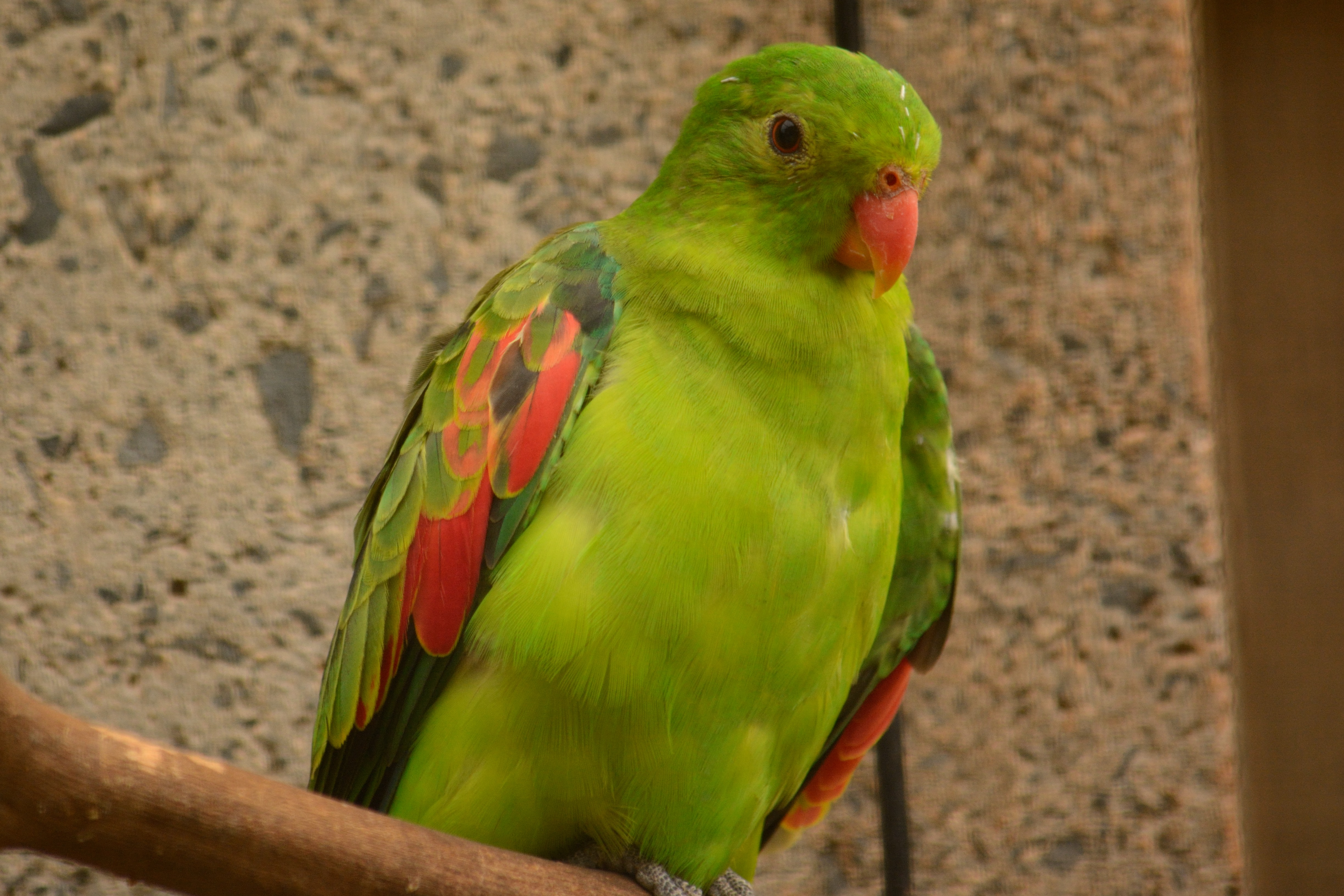
An immature male at Honolulu Zoo, Hawaii, USA.

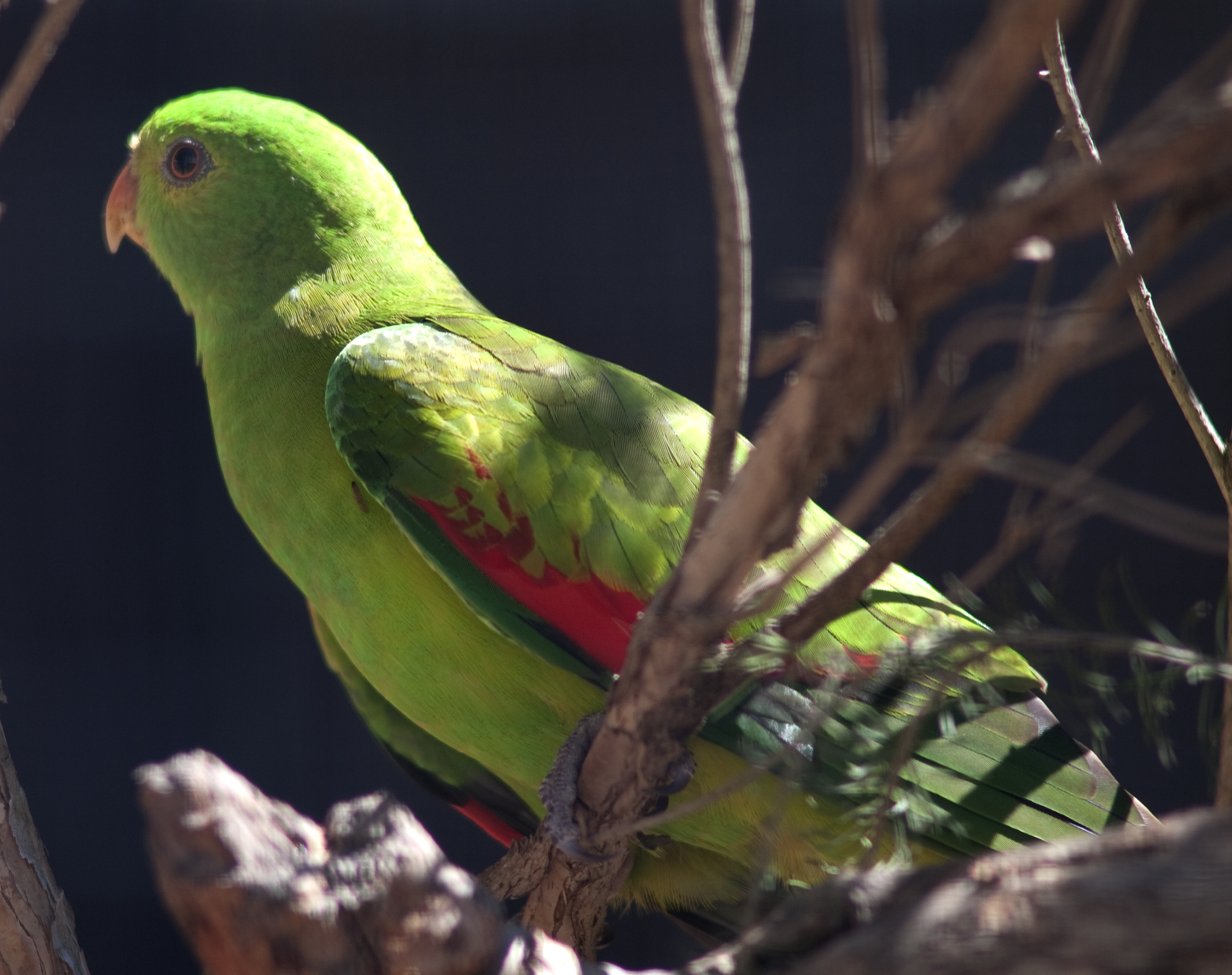
Female at Adelaide Zoo, Australia

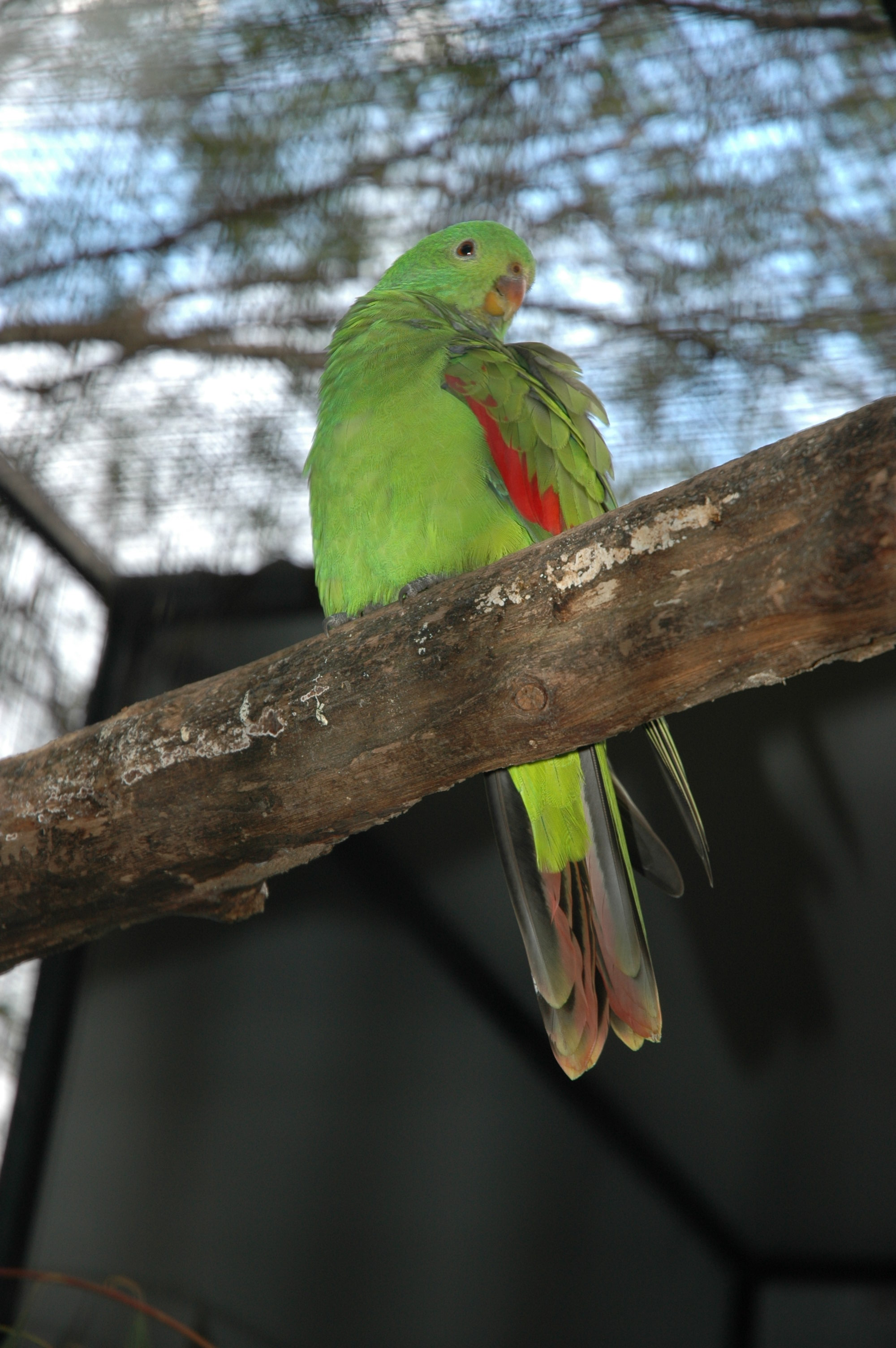
Juvenile in an aviary

Carpet Springs, SW Queensland, Australia

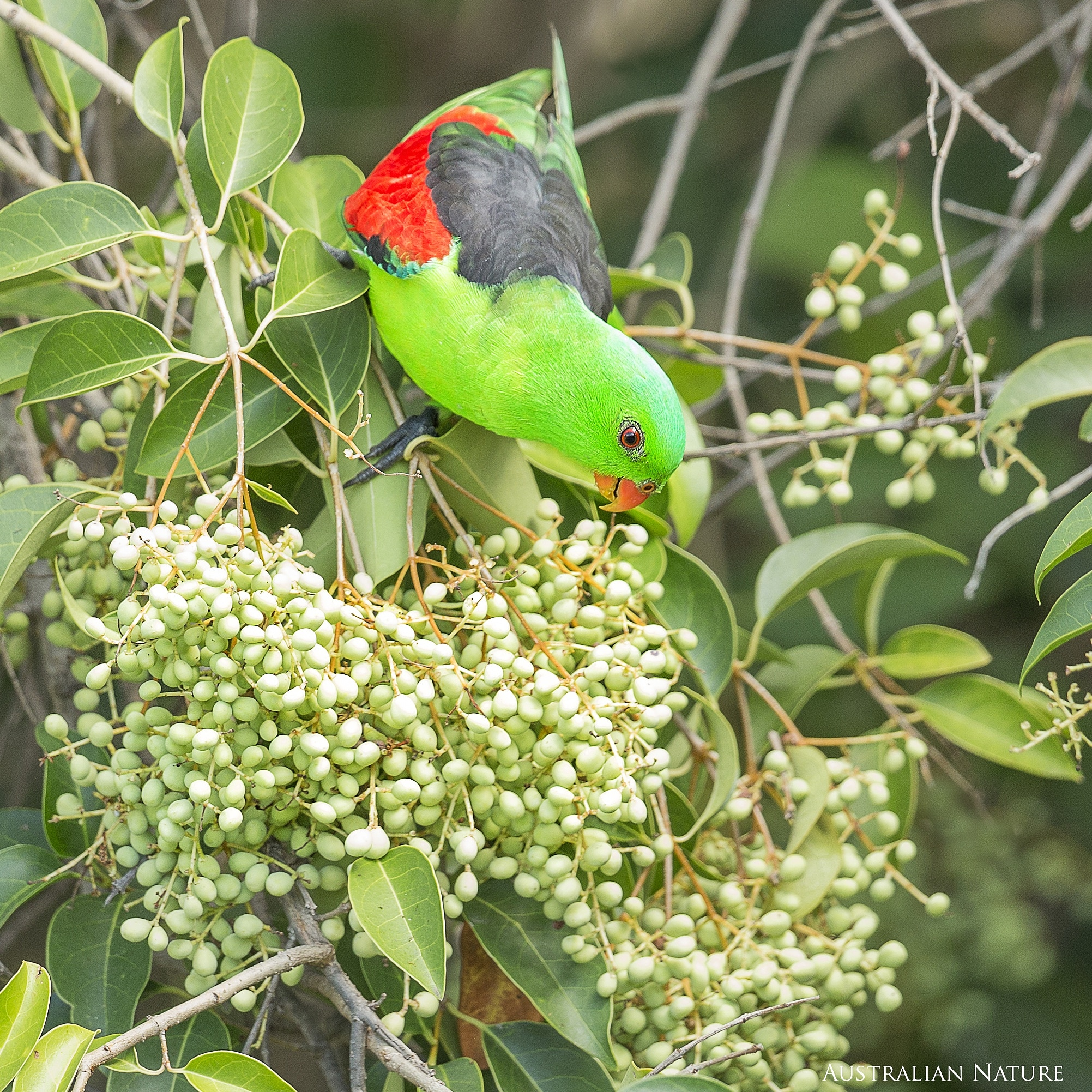
Red-winged parrot feeding on unknown fruit
