= T. purpuratus =

T. purpuratus may refer to:

- Touit purpuratus, the sapphire-rumped parrotlet, a bird species
- Trachyphonus purpuratus, the yellow-billed barbet, a bird species
