= Steffen Strait =

Strait in Papua New Guinea

- Location within Papua New Guinea
- Coordinates: 2°40′S 150°37′E
- Type: strait

Steffen Strait is a strait near Selapiu Island, generally between New Hanover and New Ireland.
