= Patio Island =

Island in Papua New Guinea

Coordinates: 2°36′S 150°33′E

Patio Island is a small island of Papua New Guinea, located to the southeast of New Hanover Island, to the north-west of New Ireland. Senta Pass separates it from Tsoilaunung Island to the north. To the south is Baudisson Island.
