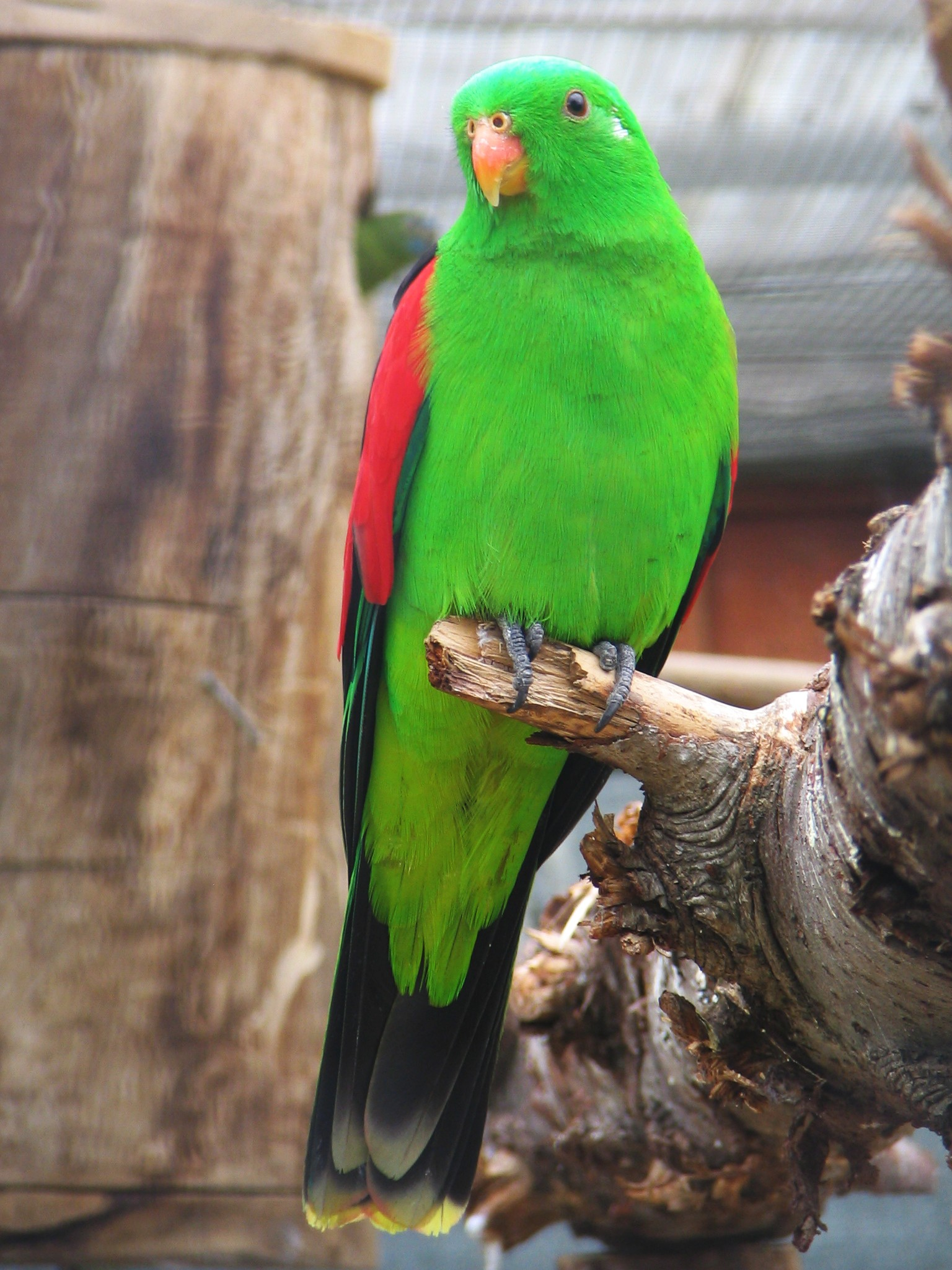
- Red-winged parrot (Aprosmictus erythropterus)

Scientific classification
- Kingdom: Animalia
- Phylum: Chordata
- Class: Aves
- Order: Psittaciformes
- Family: Psittaculidae
- Tribe: Polytelini
- Genus: Aprosmictus; Gould, 1842

Type species
- Psittacus erythropterus (red-winged parrot) Gmelin, 1788

Species
- 2, see text

= Aprosmictus =

Genus of birds

Aprosmictus is a genus of parrots in the family Psittaculidae native to Oceania. Several former members, including the Australian king parrot, are now placed in the genus Alisterus.

== Taxonomy ==
The genus Aprosmictus was introduced in 1842 by the English ornithologist John Gould. The type species was designated as the red-winged parrot by George Gray in 1846. The name is from the Ancient Greek απροσμικτος/aprosmiktos which means "unsociable" or "solitary".

The genus contains two species:

Genus Aprosmictus – Gould, 1842 – two species
Common name	Scientific name and subspecies	Range	Size and ecology	IUCN status and estimated population
Jonquil parrot	Aprosmictus jonquillaceus (Vieillot, 1818) Two subspecies: A. j. jonquillaceus; A. j. wetterensis (Salvadori, AT 1891)	Indonesian islands of Roti, Timor, and Weta	Size: Habitat: Diet:	NT
Red-winged parrot	Aprosmictus erythropterus (Gmelin, 1788) Two subspecies: A. e. coccineopterus (Gould, 1865); A. e. erythropterus (Gmelin, JF, 1788)	Southern Australia ( Pilbara, Western Australia to Cape York Peninsula, Queensland)	Size: Habitat: Diet:	LC
