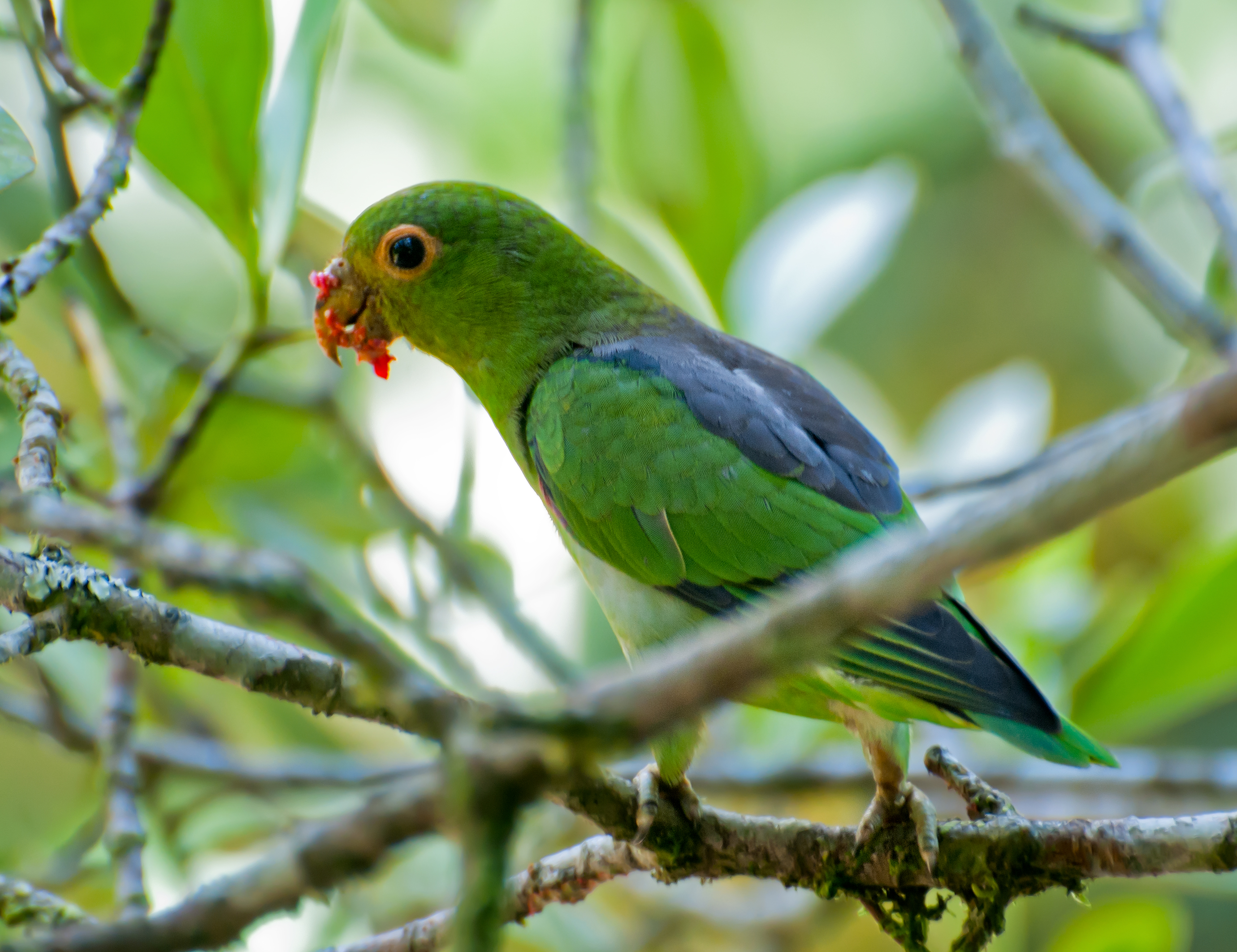
- Brown-backed parrotlet, Touit melanonotus

Scientific classification
- Kingdom: Animalia
- Phylum: Chordata
- Class: Aves
- Order: Psittaciformes
- Family: Psittacidae
- Subfamily: Arinae
- Genus: Touit; G.R. Gray, 1855

Type species
- Psittacus huetii Temminck, 1830

Species
- see text

= Touit =

Genus of birds

Touit is a genus of Neotropical parrots in the family Psittacidae.

The genus was introduced by the English zoologist George Robert Gray in 1855 with the scarlet-shouldered parrotlet (Touit huetii) as the type species. The genus name is derived from the extinct Tupi language that was spoken by native people in Brazil: Tuí eté means "really little parrot". In 1648 the German naturalist Georg Marcgrave used Tuiete for a small parrot in his Historia Naturalis Brasiliae.

The genus contains the following eight species:

Image	Scientific name	Common name	Distribution
	Touit batavicus	Lilac-tailed parrotlet	Colombia, French Guiana, Guyana, Suriname, Trinidad and Tobago, and Venezuela
	Touit huetii	Scarlet-shouldered parrotlet	Bolivia, Brazil, Colombia, Ecuador, Guyana, Peru, Trinidad and Tobago, and Venezuela
	Touit costaricensis	Red-fronted parrotlet	Central America in Costa Rica and Panama
	Touit dilectissimus	Blue-fronted parrotlet or red-winged parrotlet	coastal Andes to Peru
	Touit purpuratus	Sapphire-rumped parrotlet	Brazil, Colombia, Ecuador, French Guiana, Guyana, Peru, Suriname, and Venezuela.
	Touit melanonotus	Brown-backed parrotlet	south-eastern Brazil from Bahia to southern São Paulo
	Touit surdus	Golden-tailed parrotlet	eastern Brazil.
	Touit stictopterus	Spot-winged parrotlet	Colombia, Ecuador, and Peru
