= Baudisson Island =

Island in Papua New Guinea

Nickname: Nickname : Baudissin Island, Binnigem, Baudissen Island, Binnigen Island
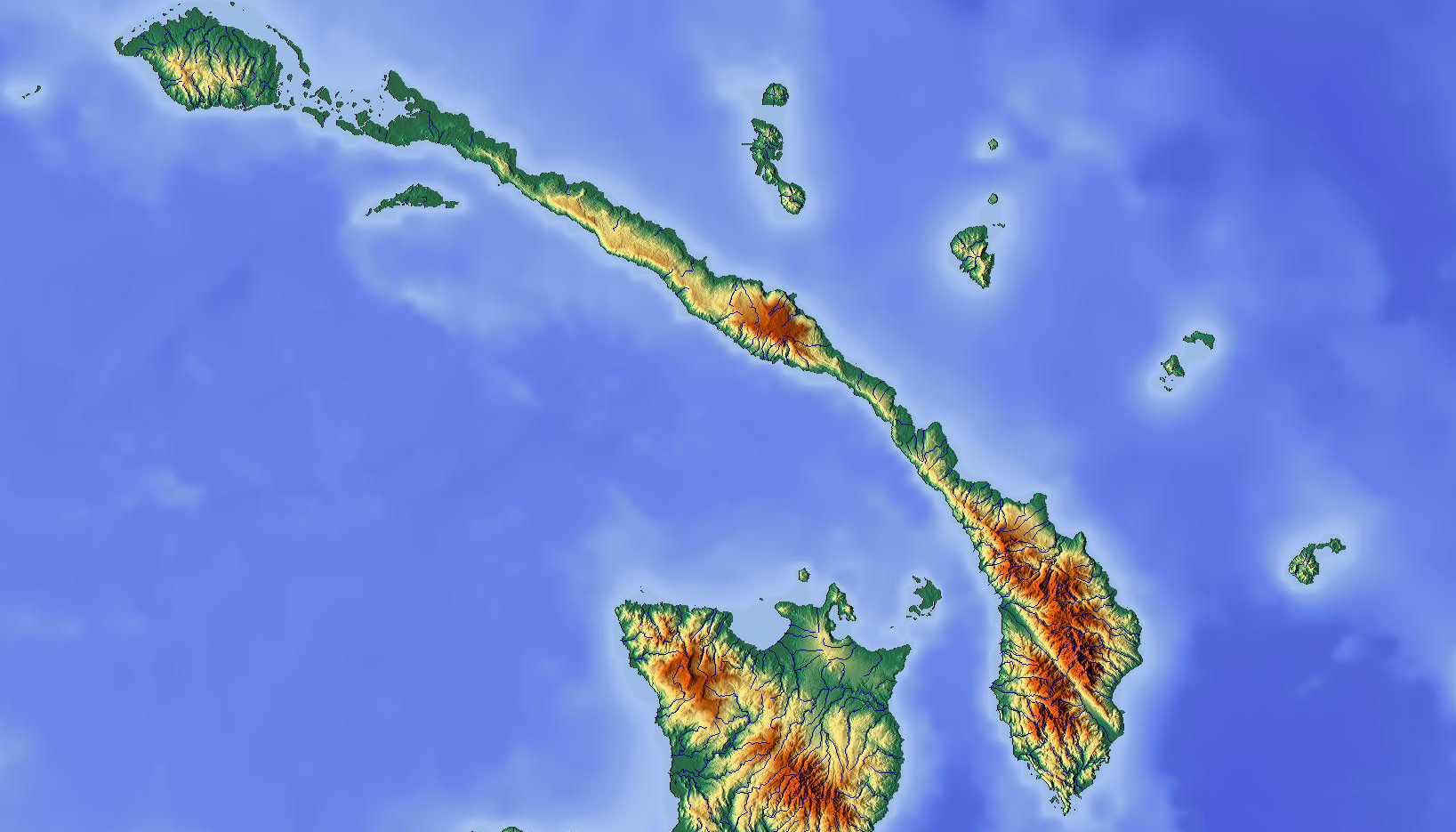
- Location within New Ireland Location within Papua New Guinea

Geography
- Location: Oceania
- Coordinates: 2°43′42″S 150°40′08″E
- Adjacent to: Bismarck Sea
- Total islands: 5
- Area: 23.4 km^{2} (9.0 sq mi)

Administration
- Papua New Guinea
- Province: New Ireland
- District: Kavieng District
- LLG: Tikana Rural LLG
- Island Group: New Ireland

Demographics
- Ethnic groups: Papauans, Austronesians, Melanesians.

Additional information
- Time zone: AEST (UTC+10)
- ISO code: PG-MBA
- Official website: www.ncdc.gov.pg

Baudisson Island is an island of Papua New Guinea, located south of New Hanover Island and west of the northern part of New Ireland. It is located between Selapiu Island and Manne Island. There is a plantation on the island.

== Geography ==
The latitude is -2°43'41.92" and the longitude is 150°40'7.76".
