= Tsoilaunung Island =

Papua New Guinea island

Coordinates: 2°33′S 150°32′E

Tsoilaunung Island is an island of Papua New Guinea, located to the east of New Hanover Island, to the north of New Ireland. The island is also known as Tsoi. Senta Pass separates it from Patio Island to its south.
