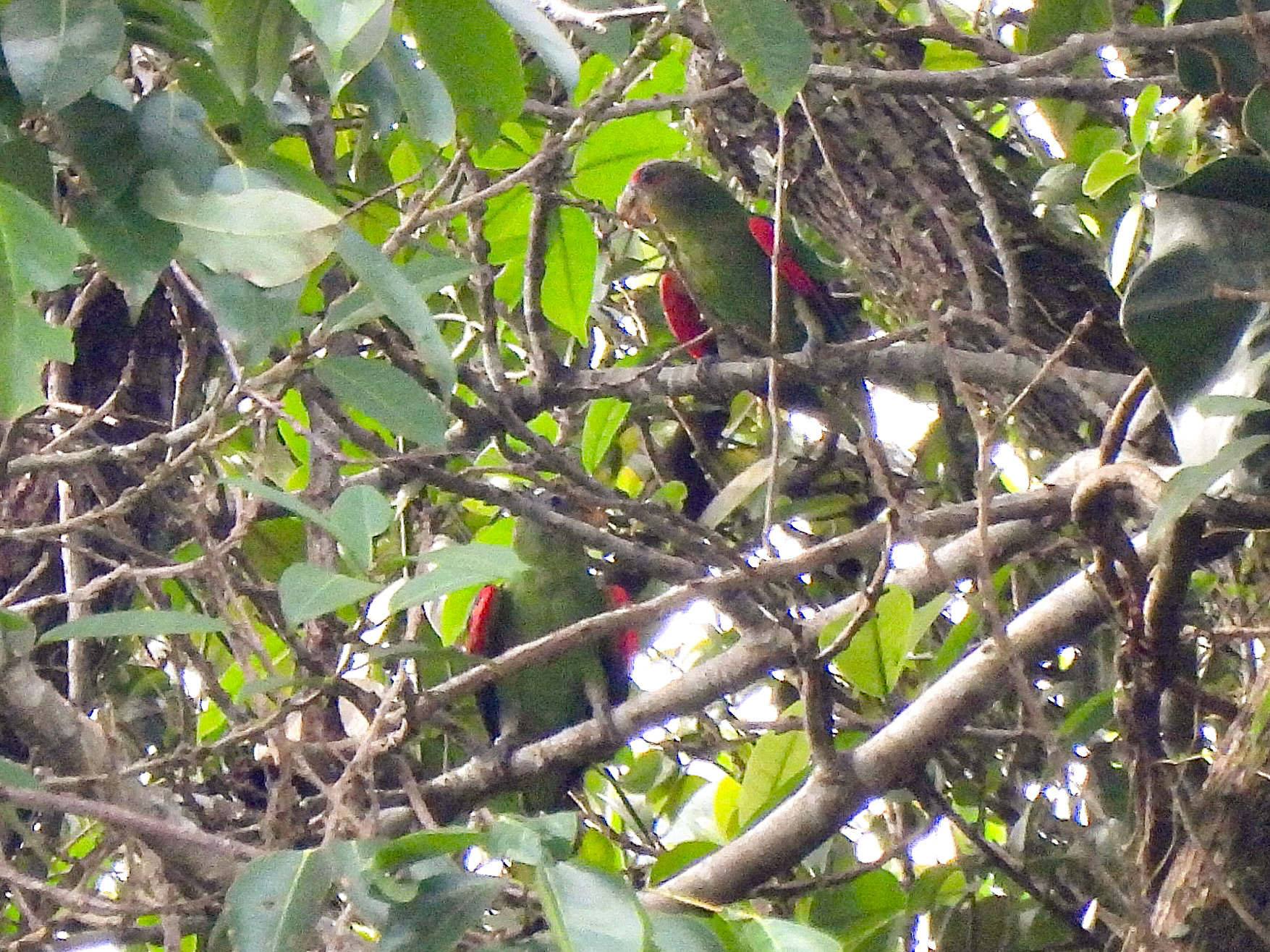

Conservation status
- Near Threatened (IUCN 3.1)
- CITES Appendix II

Scientific classification
- Kingdom: Animalia
- Phylum: Chordata
- Class: Aves
- Order: Psittaciformes
- Family: Psittacidae
- Genus: Touit
- Species: T. costaricensis

Binomial name
- Touit costaricensis (Cory, 1913)

Synonyms
- Touit dilectissimus costaricensis

= Red-fronted parrotlet =

Species of bird

The red-fronted parrotlet (Touit costaricensis) is a Near Threatened species of bird in subfamily Arinae of the family Psittacidae, the African and New World parrots. It is found in Costa Rica and Panama.

== Taxonomy and systematics ==
The red-fronted parrotlet has been treated by some authors as a subspecies of the blue-fronted parrotlet (T. dilectissimus), and the two are now considered a superspecies. The red-fronted parrotlet is monotypic.

== Description ==
The red-fronted parrotlet is about 15 to 17 cm (5.9 to 6.7 in) long and weighs about 80 g (2.8 oz). Its body is mostly green, darker above than below. Its forehead ("front") and much of its face are red with a bit of blue on the latter and a white eye ring. Its crown and hindneck are bronze-green and its throat yellowish. It has much red on the wing's "wrist", and its primaries are black with green outer edges. Its underwing coverts are yellow. Its tail has a square end; the central tail feathers are black and the others yellow with black tips. Males have more red on their face than females and immatures have almost none.

== Distribution and habitat ==
The red-fronted parrotlet is found from western Costa Rica into western Panama as far as Coclé Province, and is more numerous on the Caribbean slope than the Pacific. In the dry season it inhabits very wet and cool evergreen montane forest at elevations up to 3,000 m (9,800 ft); in the wet season it moves to lower elevation rainforest.

== Behavior ==
=== Movement ===
The red-fronted parrotlet is an elevational migrant, moving between high elevation in the dry season and lower, sometimes to sea level, in the rainy season. It is usually found year-round between 500 and 1,500 m (1,600 and 4,900 ft).

=== Feeding ===
The red-fronted parrotlet typically forages on trees and epiphytes in the canopy. Its diet is fruit; plants of families Melastomataceae and Ericaceae are known contributors.

=== Vocalization ===
The red-fronted parrotlet gives "a shrill, querulous chheee? chee, che-de-de-dee" call. Its flight call is "a slightly nasal 'kyee kyee'."

== Status ==
The IUCN originally assessed the red-fronted parrotlet as Near Threatened, then in 2000 as Vulnerable, and since 2021 again as Near Threatened. It has a somewhat restricted range and an estimated population of less than 12,000 mature individuals that is believed to be decreasing. "Habitat loss is however low within the range, particularly in the highlands, and the species is not facing substantial threats." "Uncommon to rare, although probably much overlooked and tolerant of a degree of habitat disturbance; apparently not traded."
