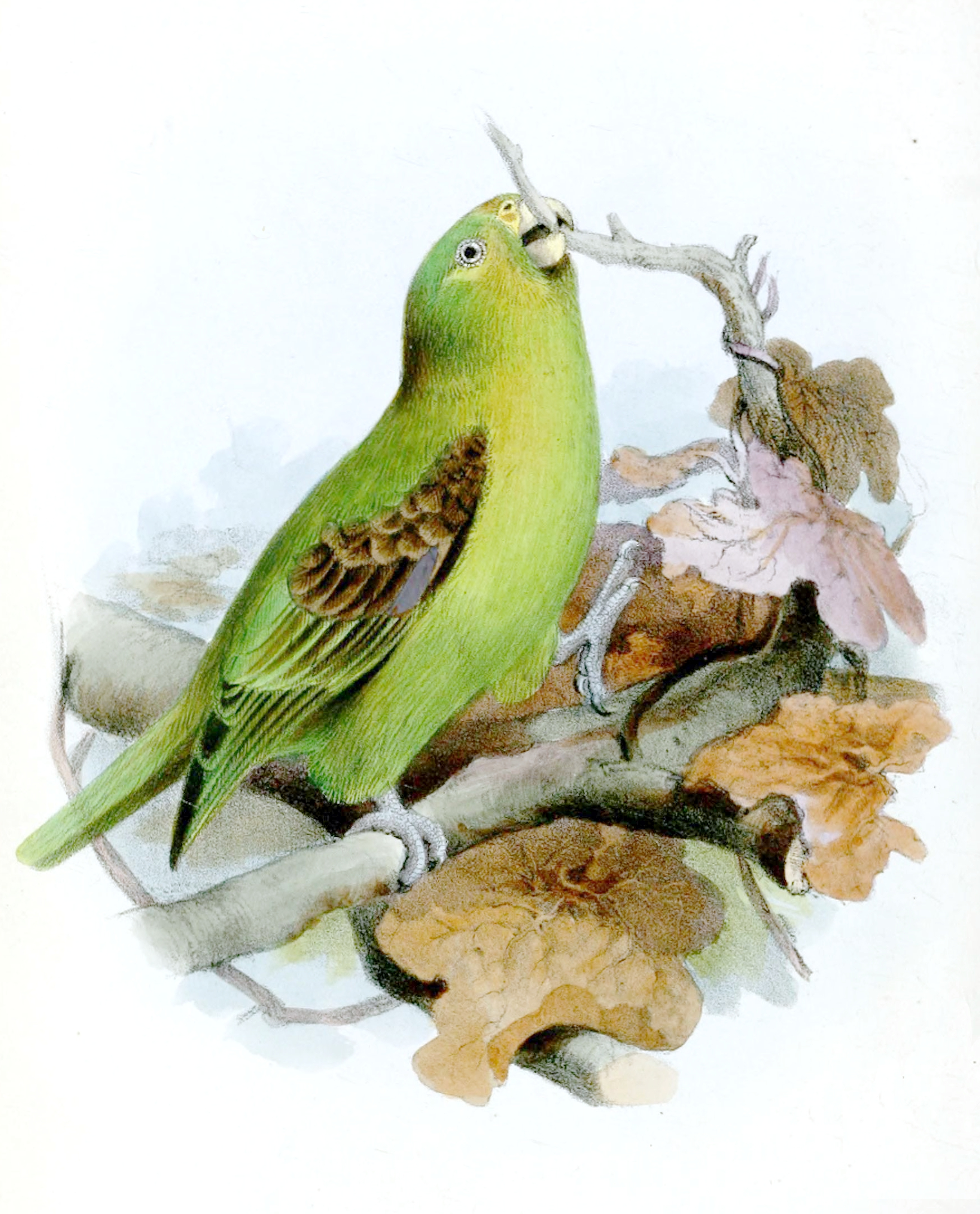

Conservation status
- Near Threatened (IUCN 3.1)
- CITES Appendix II

Scientific classification
- Kingdom: Animalia
- Phylum: Chordata
- Class: Aves
- Order: Psittaciformes
- Family: Psittacidae
- Genus: Touit
- Species: T. stictopterus

Binomial name
- Touit stictopterus (Sclater, PL, 1862)

Synonyms
- Touit stictoptera (lapsus)

= Spot-winged parrotlet =

Species of bird

The spot-winged parrotlet (Touit stictopterus) is a Near Threatened species of bird in subfamily Arinae of the family Psittacidae, the African and New World parrots. It is found in Colombia, Ecuador, and Peru.

== Taxonomy and systematics ==
The spot-winged parrotlet is monotypic. A subspecies T. s. papilo was proposed but it cannot be separated from the rest of the species. A full species T. emmae was at one time proposed but the description was determined to be based on a female spot-winged parrotlet.

== Description ==
The spot-winged parrotlet is 17 to 18 cm (6.7 to 7.1 in) long and weighs 71 to 84 g (2.5 to 3.0 oz). Its head, body, and tail are green, with the body darker above than below. The male's wings are dusky brown with whitish tips on their coverts that give the species its English name; two of the coverts have orange tips. Females have green coverts with black bases.

== Distribution and habitat ==
The spot-winged parrotlet has a disjunct distribution from central Colombia south on the eastern slope of the Andes through Ecuador into northern Peru. The species might have previously inhabited the gaps between its present Colombia locations. It mostly inhabits mature humid montane forest but also more open landscapes like savanna and stunted forest on ridge tops. In Peru it is thought to be mostly in forests on poor soil. In elevation it mostly ranges between 1,050 and 1,700 m (3,400 and 5,600 ft) but has been recorded as low as 500 m (1,600 ft) and as high as 2,400 m (7,900 ft).

== Behavior ==
=== Movement ===
The spot-winged parrotlet is believed to be sedentary.

=== Feeding ===
The spot-winged parrotlet often forages in small flocks. Its diet is fruit and seeds. It has been reported to raid maize fields and, in Colombia, to feed on termites.

=== Breeding ===
The spot-winged parrotlet's breeding season in Ecuador apparently includes March, but this conclusion is based on "[v]ery circumstantial evidence". Nothing else is known about its breeding biology.

=== Vocalization ===
The spot-winged parrotlet's flight call is "a harsh repeated 'ddreet-ddreet-ddreet-ddreet'." "[I]ndividuals of groups call simultaneously, resulting in a continuous noisy chattering." It also makes "a rapid chattering 'wi-chi-chi'."

== Status ==
The IUCN originally assessed the spot-winged parrotlet as Threatened, then in 1994 as Vulnerable, and since 2021 as Near Threatened. It has a somewhat limited range and its estimated population of between 5000 and 21,000 mature individuals is believed to be decreasing. "The species is threatened by the continuing loss and degradation of its forest habitat...associated with human encroachment, agriculture and settlement [and] is occurring even within protected areas."
