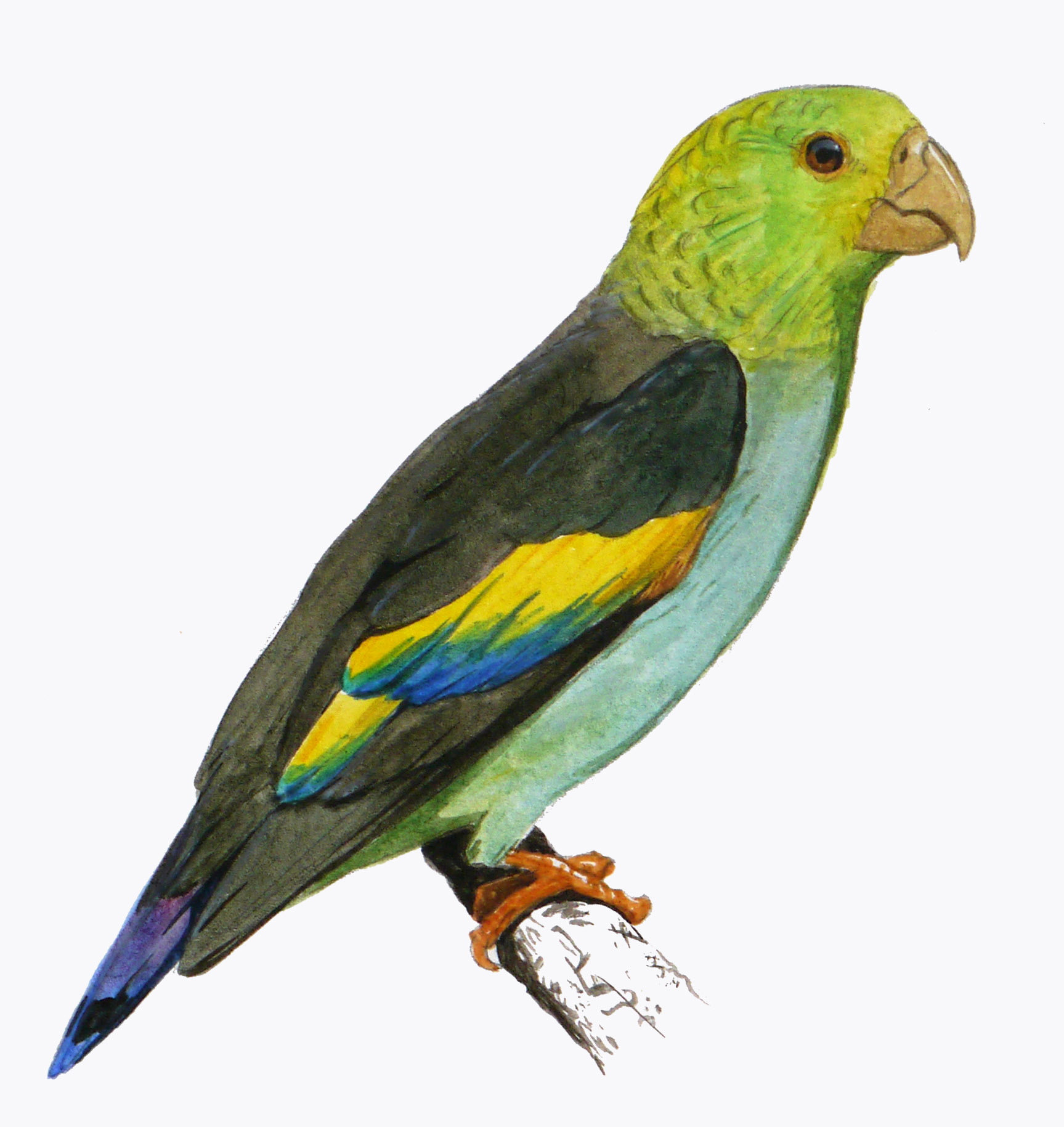

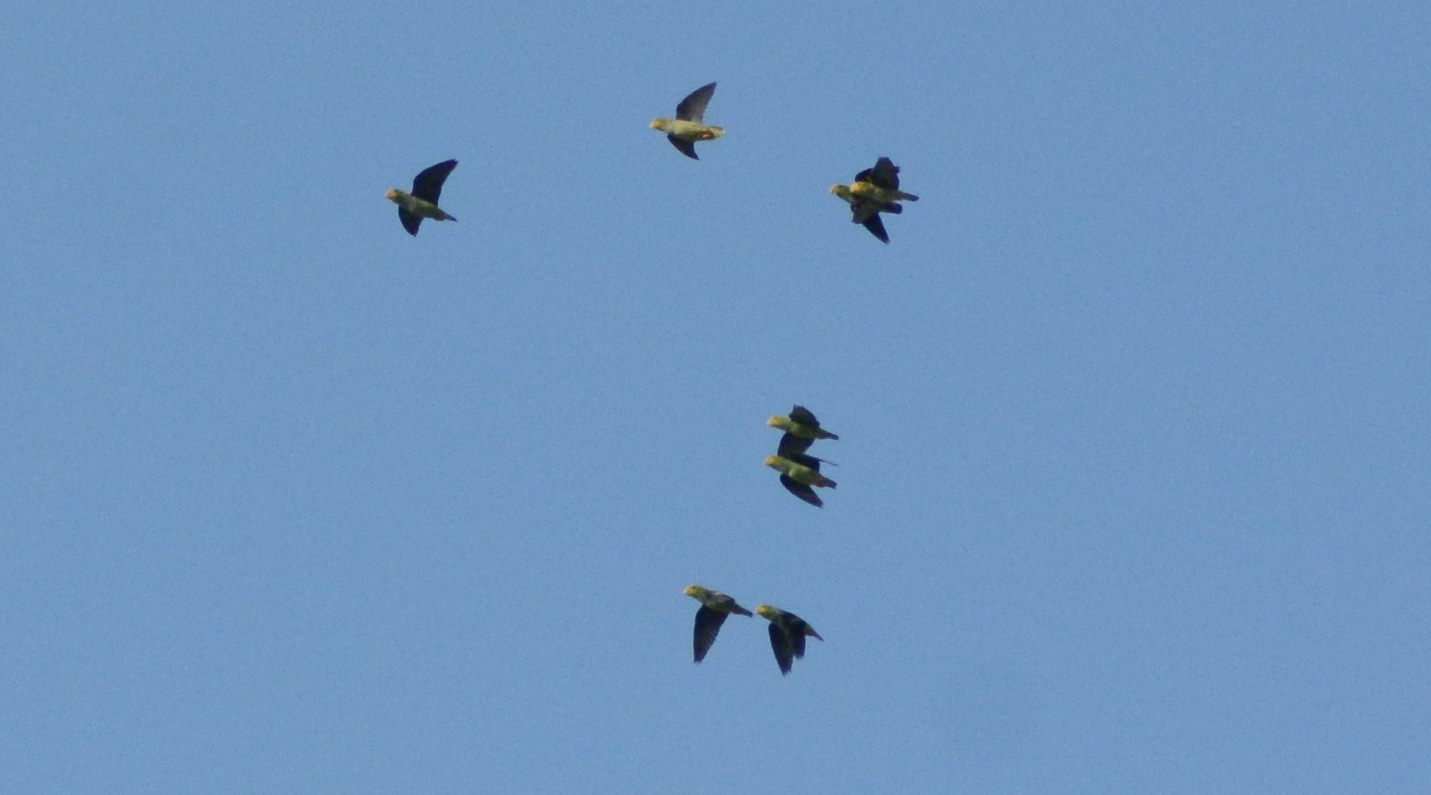
- Flying in flock

Conservation status
- Least Concern (IUCN 3.1)

Scientific classification
- Kingdom: Animalia
- Phylum: Chordata
- Class: Aves
- Order: Psittaciformes
- Family: Psittacidae
- Genus: Touit
- Species: T. batavicus

Binomial name
- Touit batavicus (Boddaert, 1783)

= Lilac-tailed parrotlet =

Species of bird

The lilac-tailed parrotlet (Touit batavicus) is a species of bird in subfamily Arinae of the family Psittacidae, the African and New World parrots. It is found in Colombia, French Guiana, Guyana, Suriname, Trinidad, and Venezuela.

== Taxonomy and systematics ==
The lilac-tailed parrotlet was described by the French polymath Georges-Louis Leclerc, Comte de Buffon in 1780 in his Histoire Naturelle des Oiseaux. The bird was also illustrated in a hand-colored plate engraved by François-Nicolas Martinet in the Planches Enluminées D'Histoire Naturelle which was produced under the supervision of Edme-Louis Daubenton to accompany Buffon's text. Neither the plate caption nor Buffon's description included a scientific name but in 1783 the Dutch naturalist Pieter Boddaert coined the binomial name Psittaca batavica in his catalogue of the Planches Enluminées. Buffon believed that his specimen had come from Batavia (modern Jakarta) but the German ornithologist Hans von Berlepsch realised this was an error and in 1908 substituted Venezuela as the type locality. The lilac-tailed parrotlet is now placed in the genus Touit that was introduced by the English zoologist George Robert Gray in 1855. The genus name is derived from the extinct Tupi language that was spoken by native people in Brazil: Tuí eté means "really little parrot".

The lilac-tailed parrotlet is monotypic.

== Description ==
The violet-tailed parrotlet is about 14 cm (5.5 in) long and weighs 52 to 72 g (1.8 to 2.5 oz). Its head is mostly yellow with green ear coverts. The sides of its neck are green and its nape has a dusky scaled appearance. Its back and wings are black and its greater wing coverts are yellowish green with green-blue edges and a red carpal bar. Its tail is purplish rose with a black band near the end. Its throat is green, its breast pale blue, its belly green, and its underwing coverts blue.

== Distribution and habitat ==
The violet-tailed parrotlet is found discontinuously across northern South America. The regions include Colombia's Sierra Nevada de Santa Marta, two coastal areas in Venezuela, the island of Trinidad, and a broad swath from eastern Venezuela through Guyana and Suriname and across much of French Guiana. In most of its range it inhabits lowland deciduous forest but in Colombia and the Venezuelan Coastal Range it occurs in cloudforest between 700 and 1,700 m (2,300 and 5,600 ft). It uses both pristine and disturbed primary and secondary forest.

== Behavior ==
=== Movement ===
The violet-tailed parrotlet is non-migratory but appears to be somewhat nomadic.

=== Feeding ===
The violet-tailed parrotlet does most of its foraging in the morning. Its diet includes flowers, nectar, buds, berries, seeds, and fruits.

=== Breeding ===
The violet-tailed parrotlet's breeding season has not been determined. Fledglings have been noter in December in Suriname and between January and March on Trinidad. The species nests in a cavity such as a hollow limb or one it excavates in an arboreal termite nest. The clutch size is five or six eggs. The incubation period, time to fledging, and details of parental care are not known.

=== Vocalization ===
The violet-tailed parrotlet's most common calls are "a slightly nasal "ryee" or "nee-ryee"." Large flocks in flight make "a continuous, monotonous, noisy chattering." It also makes "a very nasal "naaee" or "rrhaaee"" when perched.

== Status ==
The IUCN has assessed the violet-tailed parrotlet as being of Least Concern. It has a fairly large range, but its population size is not known and is believed to be decreasing. No immediate threats have been identified. Sources differ on how much it is used in the pet trade. It occurs in one national park in Venezuela.
