= Manne Island =

Island of Papua New Guinea

Manne Island is an island of the Bismarcke Archipelago of Papua New Guinea, located of the north-west coast of New Ireland, at 2°42′S 150°43′E. It is located east of Baudisson Island; Balgai Bay separates it from the town of Kavieng on the northern tip of New Ireland.
