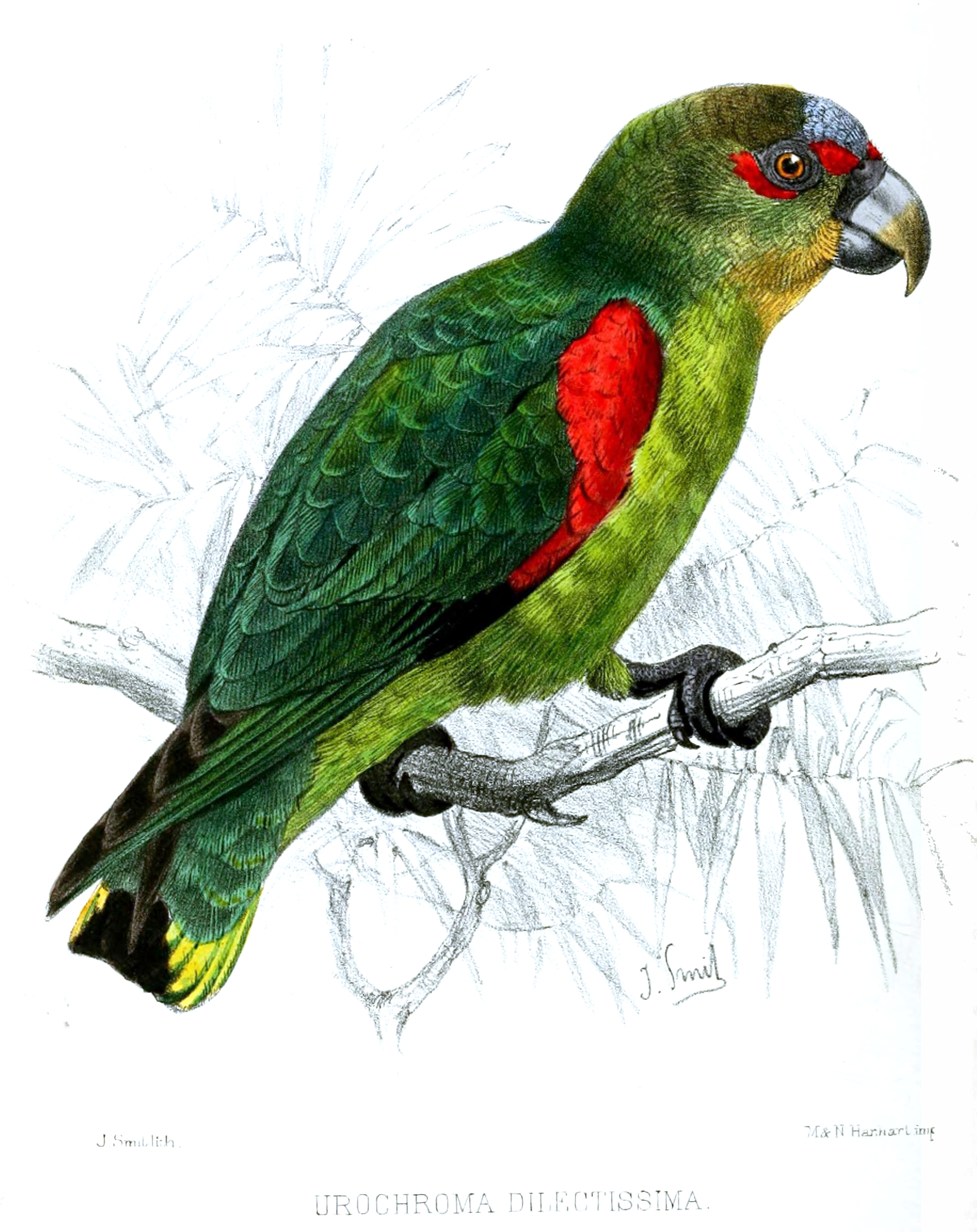
- Illustration by Joseph Smit, 1870

Conservation status
- Least Concern (IUCN 3.1)
- CITES Appendix II (CITES)

Scientific classification
- Kingdom: Animalia
- Phylum: Chordata
- Class: Aves
- Order: Psittaciformes
- Family: Psittacidae
- Genus: Touit
- Species: T. dilectissimus

Binomial name
- Touit dilectissimus (Sclater, PL & Salvin, 1871)

Synonyms
- Urochroma dilectissima

= Blue-fronted parrotlet =

Species of bird

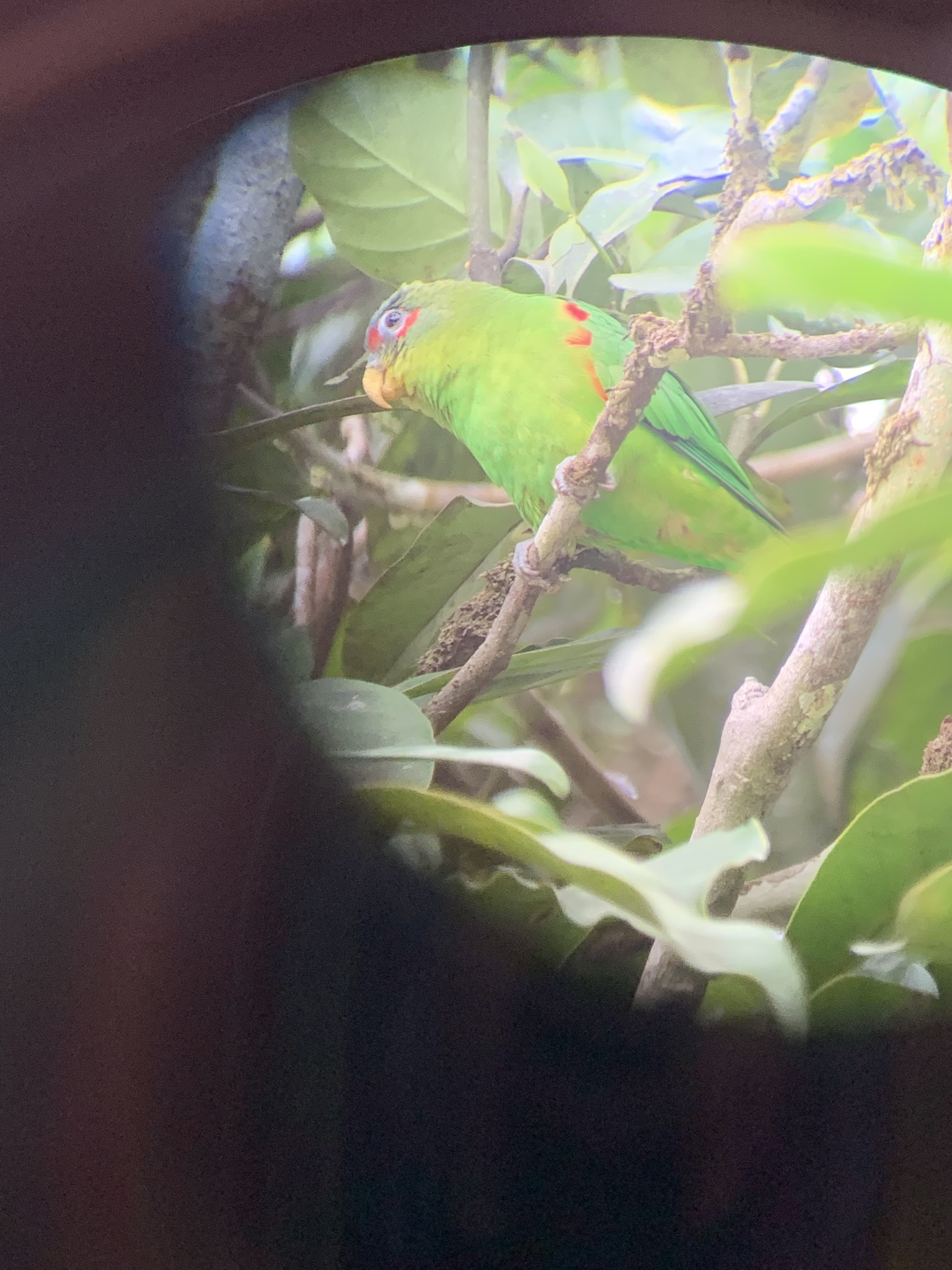
A blue-fronted parrotlet seen through a scope in the Panamá Oeste Province of Panama

The blue-fronted parrotlet (Touit dilectissimus) is a species of bird in subfamily Arinae of the family Psittacidae, the African and New World parrots. It is found in Colombia, Ecuador, Panama, and Venezuela.

== Taxonomy and systematics ==
The blue-fronted parrotlet is monotypic. However, some authors have treated it as conspecific with red-fronted parrotlet (T. costaricensis) under that English name. The two form a superspecies.

== Description ==
The blue-fronted parrotlet is about 17 to 18 cm (6.7 to 7.1 in) long and weighs 59 to 71 g (2.1 to 2.5 oz). Its body is mostly green, darker above than below. Its forehead ("front") is blue; it has a white eye ring and a red line in front of and below the eye with more blue below it. Its crown and hindneck are bronze-green. It has much red on the wing's "wrist", and its primaries are black with green outer edges. Its underwing coverts are yellow. Its central tail feathers are black and the others yellow with black tips. Males have more red on their wing than females; immatures resemble females with a less distinctive facial pattern.

== Distribution and habitat ==
The blue-fronted parrotlet is found from eastern Panama south along the Pacific slope of Colombia and Ecuador as far as El Oro Province and in the Andes and Serranía del Perijá of Venezuela. It inhabits cloudforest and mature secondary forest. In the Andes it mostly ranges in elevation between 500 and 1,400 m (1,600 and 4,600 ft) but is found as low as 100 m (300 ft) and in Colombia often to 2,000 m (6,600 ft); in Venezuela it mostly occurs between 1,300 and 1,600 m (4,300 and 5,200 ft). It has been recorded as high as 3,000 m (9,800 ft). Its population is localized and spread out across its range.

== Behavior ==
They are gregarious, often found in small groups of up to 15 individuals. They are usually overlooked due to their quiet nature while feeding and roosting in tree canopies, but can be very noisy when in flight. Blue-fronted parrotlets are seen more often at the forest edge.

=== Movement ===
Blue-fronted parrotlets make seasonal movements from their core range to the lowlands and high elevations.

=== Feeding ===
Little is known about the blue-fronted parrotlet's diet. Stomach contents of specimens have included small fruits, though it is unknown whether the fruit pulp or the seeds were the target. It has been documented feeding on the seeds of fruits of the family Clusiaceae.

=== Breeding ===
The blue-fronted parrotlet apparently breeds in May and June in Panama. Its season in Colombia includes March and June but is not well defined. The few known nests were excavated in arboreal termite nests; one in Colombia was about 7 m (23 ft) above the ground.

=== Vocalization ===
The blue-fronted parrotlet's most common calls are "a slightly nasal "chree" or bisyllabic "chu-ree"." Flocks in flight call together, "resulting in a continuous, noisy chattering." When perched it also makes "a soft churring "krr"."

== Status ==
The IUCN has assessed the blue-fronted parrotlet as being of Least Concern. It has a large range but its population size is not known and is believed to be decreasing. No immediate threats have been identified. "Uncommon to rare...much habitat remains, little trade exists, and it is relatively secure."
