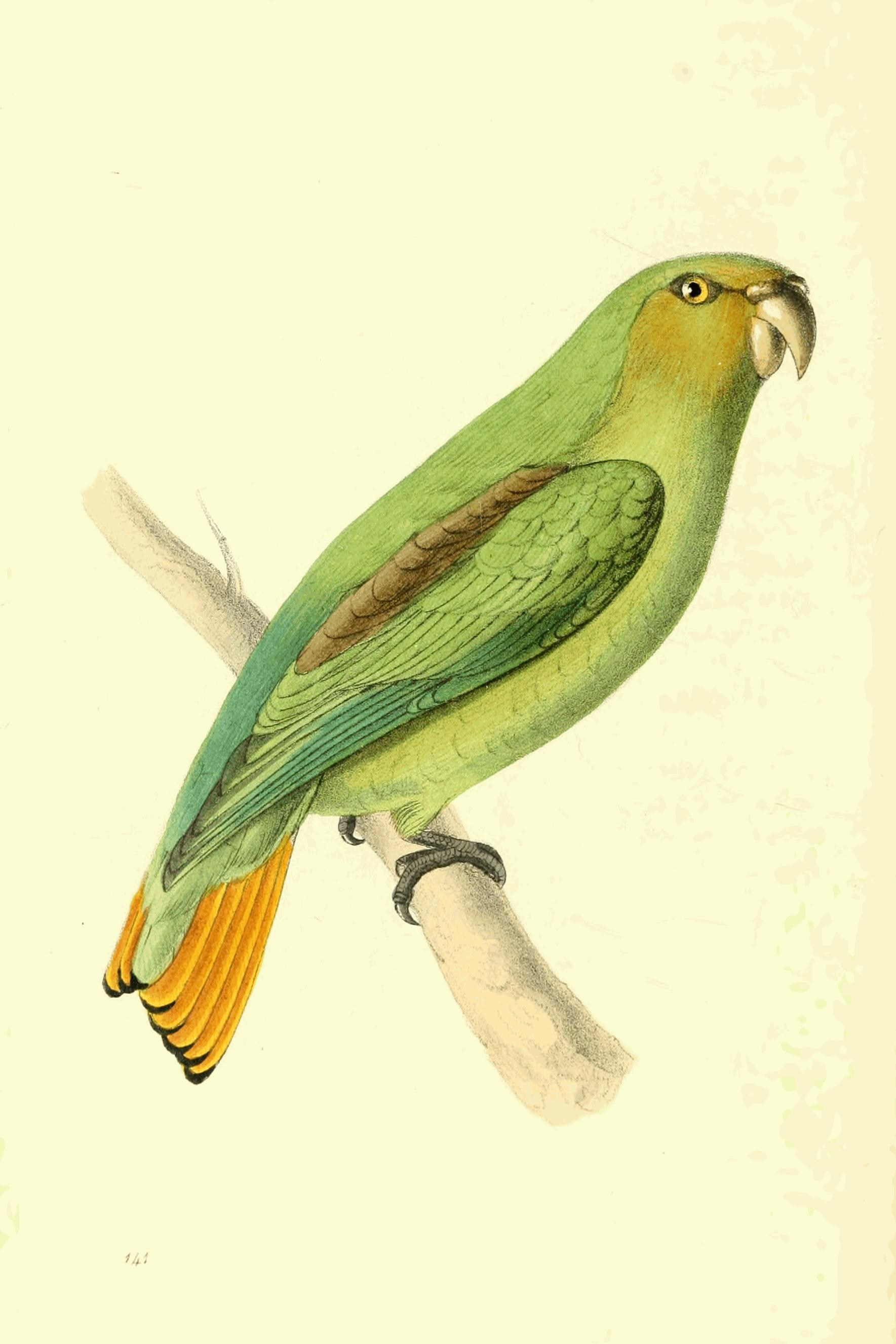

Conservation status
- Vulnerable (IUCN 3.1)
- CITES Appendix II (CITES)

Scientific classification
- Kingdom: Animalia
- Phylum: Chordata
- Class: Aves
- Order: Psittaciformes
- Family: Psittacidae
- Genus: Touit
- Species: T. surdus

Binomial name
- Touit surdus (Kuhl, 1820)

Synonyms
- Touit surda (lapsus)

= Golden-tailed parrotlet =

Species of bird

The golden-tailed parrotlet (Touit surdus) is a Vulnerable species of bird in subfamily Arinae of the family Psittacidae, the African and New World parrots. It is endemic to eastern Brazil.

== Taxonomy and systematics ==
The golden-tailed parrotlet is monotypic. However, the northern population might merit separation as a subspecies.

== Description ==
The golden-tailed parrotlet is about 16 cm (6.3 in) long. Its body is mostly green, darker above than below, and rather emerald green on the rump and uppertail coverts. Its forehead, lores, and cheeks are yellow; it has a white eye ring. Its scapulars are olive-brown. Its flight feathers are dusky brown with green edges, its primary coverts dark brown, the other wing coverts green, and the carpal area blue. Males' central tail feathers are green and the others greenish yellow; all have narrow black tips. Females are very similar to males but have somewhat duller underparts and greener tail feathers.

== Distribution and habitat ==
The golden-tailed parrotlet has a disjunct distribution in northeastern and eastern Brazil. It is found in Ceará, intermittently from Pernambuco to Alagoas, and again intermittently between Bahia and São Paulo state. It inhabits humid evergreen forest and forest on sandy soils both primary and secondary. It also frequents cacao plantations, and inland is found in the lower levels of montane forest. In elevation it is found from sea level to 900 or 1,000 m (3,000 or 3,300 ft).

== Behavior ==
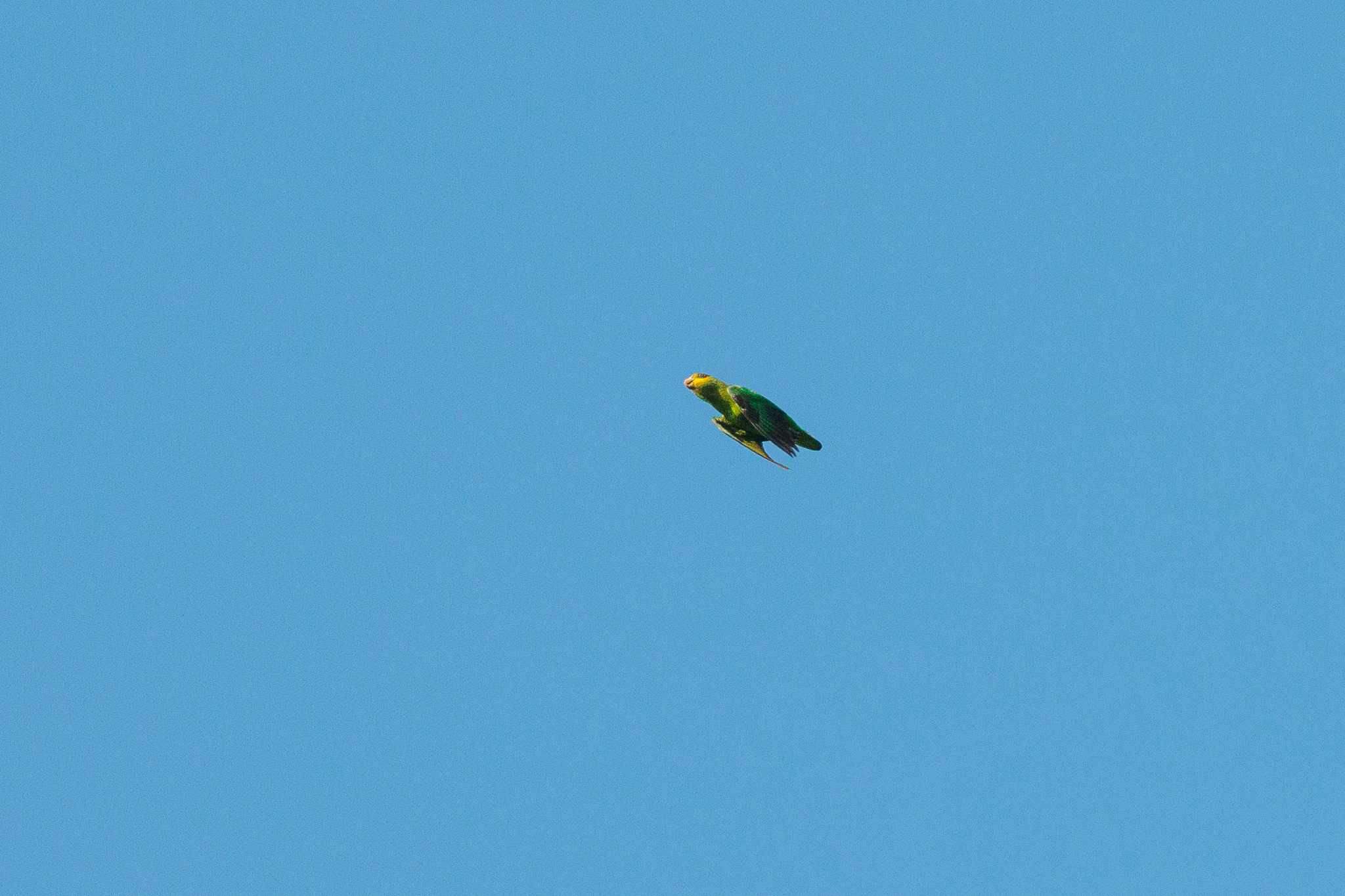
A golden-tailed parrotlet mid-flight near João Pessoa, Paraíba

=== Movement ===
Some season movements of the golden-tailed parrotlet have been noted, but they are not well defined.

=== Feeding ===
The golden-tailed parrotlet usually forages in small flocks that are suspected to be family groups. Its diet is mostly fruit but details are lacking.

=== Breeding ===
The golden-tailed parrotlet is thought to start breeding behavior in September or October, the start of the rainy season. The only known nests were in arboreal termite nests. The clutch size, incubation period, time to fledging, and details of parental care are not known.

=== Vocalization ===
The golden-tailed parrotlet's call is a "falsetto 'kree-kree-kree-kruh- -' or shrieking 'k'reeéh'."

== Status ==
The IUCN originally assessed the golden-tailed parrotlet as Threatened, then in 1994 Endangered, and since 2004 as Vulnerable. It has a very limited range and its estimated population of fewer than 10,000 mature individuals is believed to be decreasing. "Extensive deforestation throughout its range is regarded as the principal cause of its rarity". However, it "has been found to be more resilient to forest fragmentation than first thought, and it may be under-recorded rather than genuinely scarce, especially in the southern part of its range." It does occur in many private and government reserves.
