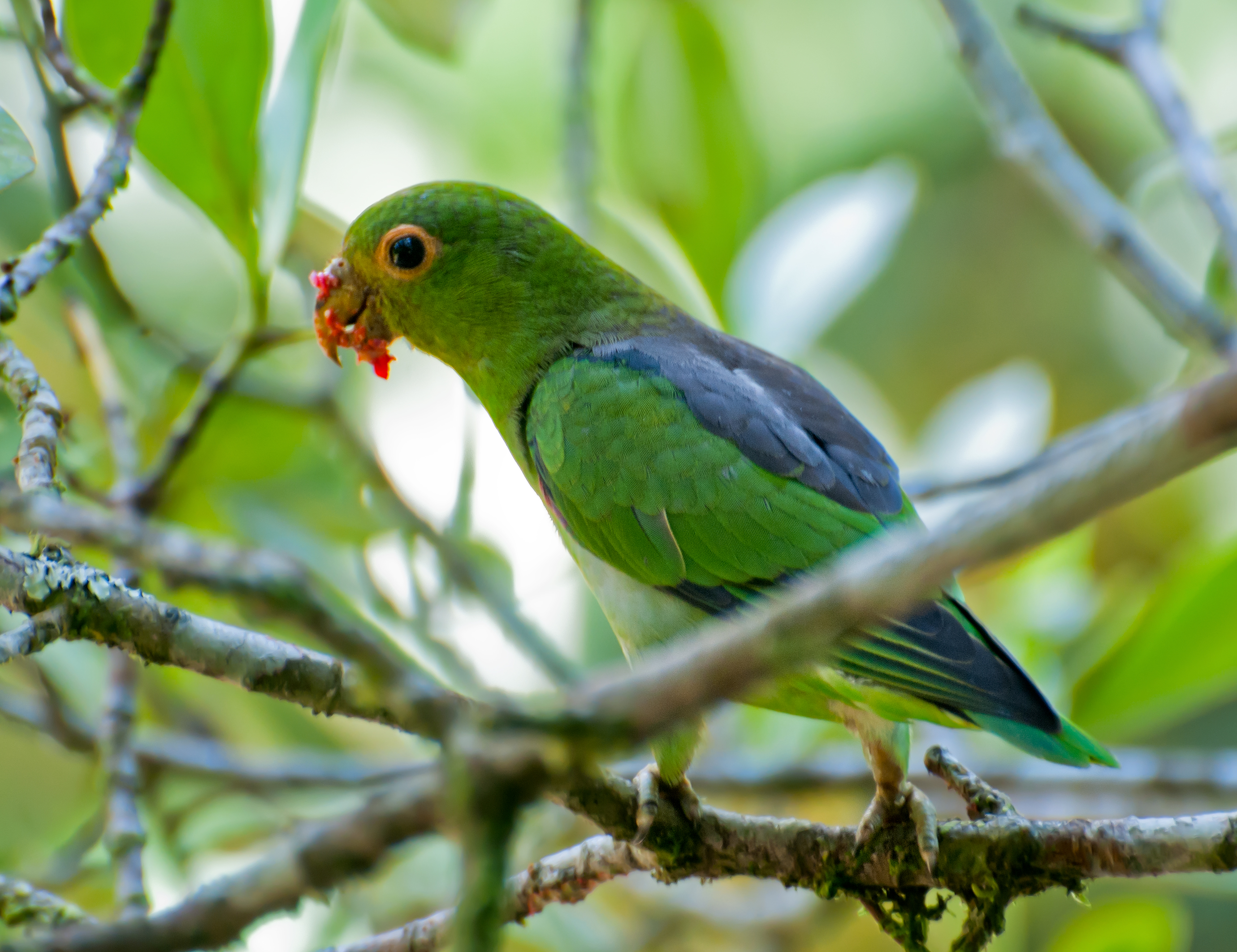
- In Ubatuba, São Paulo, Brazil

Conservation status
- Near Threatened (IUCN 3.1)

Scientific classification
- Kingdom: Animalia
- Phylum: Chordata
- Class: Aves
- Order: Psittaciformes
- Family: Psittacidae
- Genus: Touit
- Species: T. melanonotus

Binomial name
- Touit melanonotus (Wied, 1820)

= Brown-backed parrotlet =

Species of bird

The brown-backed parrotlet (Touit melanonotus) also known as the black-backed parrotlet, the black-eared parrotlet, and Wied's parrotlet, is a small (15 cm or 6 in) green parrot found in south-eastern Brazil from Bahia to southern São Paulo. It has a dark brown mantle and back, brown ear coverts, and red outer tail with back tips. They frequent humid forest from 500–1,000 m (1,600–3,300 ft) (occasionally down to sea level), and are mostly found in small flocks of 3–20 birds.

== Ecology ==
It is mostly known from lower montane evergreen forest at 500–1,200 metres (1,600–3,900 ft), but also up to 1,400 m (4,600 ft) in the Itatiaia National Park. In addition it is found in near sea-level in Bahia and São Paulo. Seasonal migration or dispersal is suspected, though this may amount to little more than short altitudinal movements. Food items are poorly studied but include large leguminous seeds, fruit of Rapanea acuminata, Clusia sp. and mistletoes. Observed feeding on Clusia criuva where presumed adults pluck the fruit from the tree snipping the stalk with their bills and carry the fruit to a more secure location on a firmer branch where they open the fruitwith their bill wedging it against the branch prising the seeds out with their tongue; they do not use their feet at any time in the feeding process as some other psittacids do. Some individuals that were presumed to be young birds were seen to eat the fruits in situ and did not pluck them. Breeding is suspected to occur from September to October. Well grown young birds were observed being fed by adults in Ubatuba, São Paulo state, January 2010. Young birds can be differentiated by their paler orbital ring and their cere being flesh coloured as opposed to dark grey in adults.

== Range and population ==
The brown-backed parrotlet is confined to south-eastern Brazil (Bahia, Espírito Santo, Rio de Janeiro and São Paulo), but is a vagrant to Rio de Janeiro, and from São Paulo to south to Ilha do Cardoso. They were resighted in Bahia after a century long absence. They were never deemed common, but seen as rather rare, even in the 19th century. Their inconspicuous nature and naturally low densities may contribute to the paucity of records. A resurgence in sightings since the mid-1980s, and their discovery at Espírito Santo, was due to knowledge of their calls.
