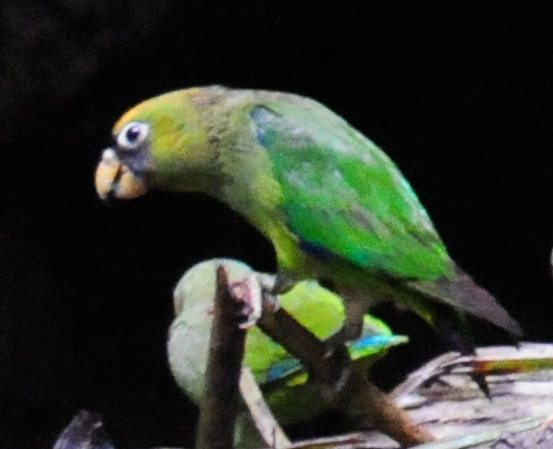
- At a clay lick in Yasuni National Park, Ecuador

Conservation status
- Least Concern (IUCN 3.1)
- CITES Appendix II

Scientific classification
- Kingdom: Animalia
- Phylum: Chordata
- Class: Aves
- Order: Psittaciformes
- Family: Psittacidae
- Genus: Touit
- Species: T. huetii

Binomial name
- Touit huetii (Temminck, 1830)

= Scarlet-shouldered parrotlet =

Species of bird

The scarlet-shouldered parrotlet (Touit huetii), also known as the red-winged parrotlet or Huet's parrotlet, is a species of bird in subfamily Arinae of the family Psittacidae, the African and New World parrots. It is found in Bolivia, Brazil, Colombia, Ecuador, Guyana, Peru, and Venezuela, possibly in Suriname, and as a vagrant to Trinidad and Tobago.

== Taxonomy and systematics ==
The scarlet-shouldered parrotlet is monotypic.

== Description ==
The scarlet-shouldered parrotlet is 15 to 16 cm (5.9 to 6.3 in) long and weighs 58 to 62 g (2.0 to 2.2 oz). Its body is mostly green, darker above than below. The front of its face is dark with a white eye ring and its crown and nape olive-brown. Its upper wing coverts are dark blue, its primaries black, and its carpal bar, underwing coverts, and axillaries red. The male's tail has green central feathers and red outer ones with black tips; females' tails are all greenish yellow with black tips. Both sexes' under tail coverts are yellow. Immature birds are like adult females but with a green face.

== Distribution and habitat ==
The scarlet-shouldered parrotlet has a disjunct distribution. It is found in northeastern Venezuela and adjacent Guyana, from southern Venezuela through southeastern Colombia, eastern Ecuador, and eastern Peru into northern Bolivia, and in the eastern Amazon Basin of Brazil. The species is thought to possibly bridge the gaps between the range sections. It has occurred as a vagrant on Trinidad, and undocumented sight records in Suriname lead the South American Classification Committee of the American Ornithological Society to call it hypothetical in that country.

The scarlet-shouldered parrotlet inhabits lowland terra firme and várzea forests. In elevation it mostly occurs below 900 m (3,000 ft) but has occasionally been recorded as high as 1,300 m (4,300 ft).

== Behavior ==
=== Movement ===
The scarlet-shouldered parrotlet is non-migratory but most probably nomadic in Amazonia. They are seldom "found in one area for more than a few weeks at a time".

=== Feeding ===
The scarlet-shouldered parrotlet's foraging technique and diet have not been documented.

=== Breeding ===
The scarlet-shouldered parrotlet's breeding season apparently includes April in southern Venezuela and September to December in southern Brazil. Nothing else is known about its breeding biology.

=== Vocalization ===
The scarlet-shouldered parrotlet's call is a "very high 'tjoot-tjoot-tjoot-' mixed with 'tjer tjer-'." Large flocks in flight make a "continuous, monotonous, noisy chattering." It gives a soft "churr" when perched.

== Status ==
The IUCN has assessed the scarlet-shouldered parrotlet as being of Least Concern. It has a large range, but its population size is not known and is believed to be decreasing. No immediate threats have been identified. "Although apparently uncommon to rare, this bird is highly unobtrusive and lives in remote areas, so may be commoner than records indicate".
