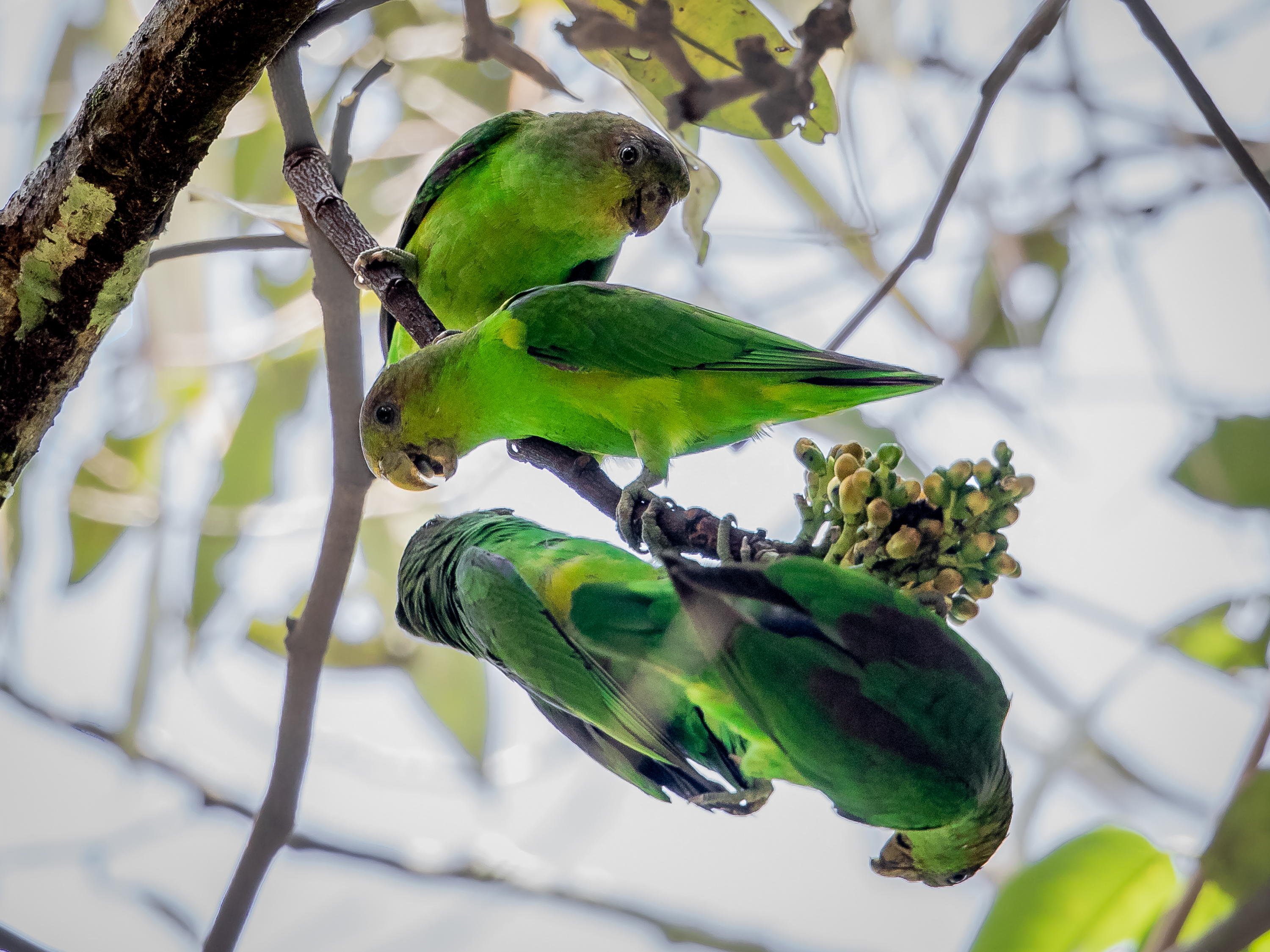

Conservation status
- Least Concern (IUCN 3.1)
- CITES Appendix II (CITES)

Scientific classification
- Kingdom: Animalia
- Phylum: Chordata
- Class: Aves
- Order: Psittaciformes
- Family: Psittacidae
- Genus: Touit
- Species: T. purpuratus

Binomial name
- Touit purpuratus (Gmelin, JF, 1788)

Synonyms
- Touit purpurata

= Sapphire-rumped parrotlet =

Species of bird

The sapphire-rumped parrotlet (Touit purpuratus) is a species of bird in subfamily Arinae of the family Psittacidae, the African and New World parrots. It is found in Brazil, Colombia, Ecuador, French Guiana, Guyana, Peru, Suriname, and Venezuela.

== Taxonomy and systematics ==
The sapphire-rumped parrotlet was described in 1781 by the English ornithologist John Latham under the English name "purple-tailed parakeet". Latham's specimen had come from Cayenne in French Guiana. When in 1788 the German naturalist Johann Friedrich Gmelin revised and expanded Carl Linnaeus's Systema Naturae, he included the sapphire-rumped parrotlet with a short description, coined the binomial name Psittacus purpuratus, and cited Latham's work. The sapphire-rumped parrotlet is now placed with seven other parrotlets in the genus Touit that was introduced in 1855 by the English zoologist George Robert Gray. The genus name is derived from the extinct Tupi language that was spoken by native people in Brazil: Tuí eté means "really little parrot". The specific epithet purpuratus is Latin meaning "clad in purple".

Two subspecies are recognized, the nominate T. p. purpuratus (Gmelin, 1788) and T. p. viridiceps (Chapman, 1929).

== Description ==
The sapphire-rumped parrotlet is 17 to 18 cm (6.7 to 7.1 in) long and weighs 54 to 66 g (1.9 to 2.3 oz). Its body is mostly green, darker above than below, and with a blue lower back and rump. The nominate subspecies' forehead and crown are olive brown and those of T. p. viridiceps are green; both have a white eye ring. The species has dusky brown scapulars that appear as a "V" when the wings are folded; females' are paler than males'. Their carpal bar is violet blue. The male's central tail feathers are green and the others red with blackish tips; female's add a green band near the tip. Immatures resemble females but are duller overall and have an olive rump.

== Distribution and habitat ==
The nominate subspecies of the sapphire-rumped parrotlet is found across northern South America from Cerro Duida in Venezuela through the Guianas and northern Amazonian Brazil to the Atlantic in the state of Maranhão. Subspecies T. p. viridiceps is found from Cerro Duida east into northwestern Brazil to the upper Rio Negro and west and south through southeastern Colombia, eastern Ecuador, and northeastern Peru.

In the tepui region where Venezuela, Guyana, and Brazil meet, the sapphire-rumped parrotlet inhabits evergreen montane forest up to about 1,400 m (4,600 ft). Elsewhere it occurs in lowland rainforest favoring várzea, but also savanna, remaining woodlots in otherwise cleared landscapes, and isolated mountains in the Guianan lowlands. In Brazil it locally reaches 1,200 m (3,900 ft).

== Behavior ==
=== Feeding ===
The sapphire-rumped parrotlet mostly feeds on fruits; those of figs (Ficus) and members of several other families have been identified. "In NE Peru recorded feeding on leaves, shoots and bark of Terminalia catappa (Combretaceae) as well as on dead wood."

=== Breeding ===
The sapphire-rumped parrotlet's nesting seasons include March in Venezuela and both April and November in the Guianas. Known nests have been cavities in dead trees and in arboreal termite nests. The clutch size is thought to be three to five eggs. The incubation period, time to fledging, and details of parental care are not known.

=== Vocalization ===
The sapphire-rumped parrotlet's flight call is an "almost goose-like" "nasal 'nyaah'". Flocks in flight call together, "resulting in a continuous nasal chattering sound." It also makes a "rapid rattling "che-che-che"" when perched.

== Status ==
The IUCN has assessed the sapphire-rumped parrotlet as being of Least Concern. It has a very large range, and though its population size is not known it is believed to be stable. No immediate threats have been identified. It occurs in several protected areas in Brazil and is "[u]ncommon, never in large numbers, but inconspicuous and therefore perhaps underrecorded."
