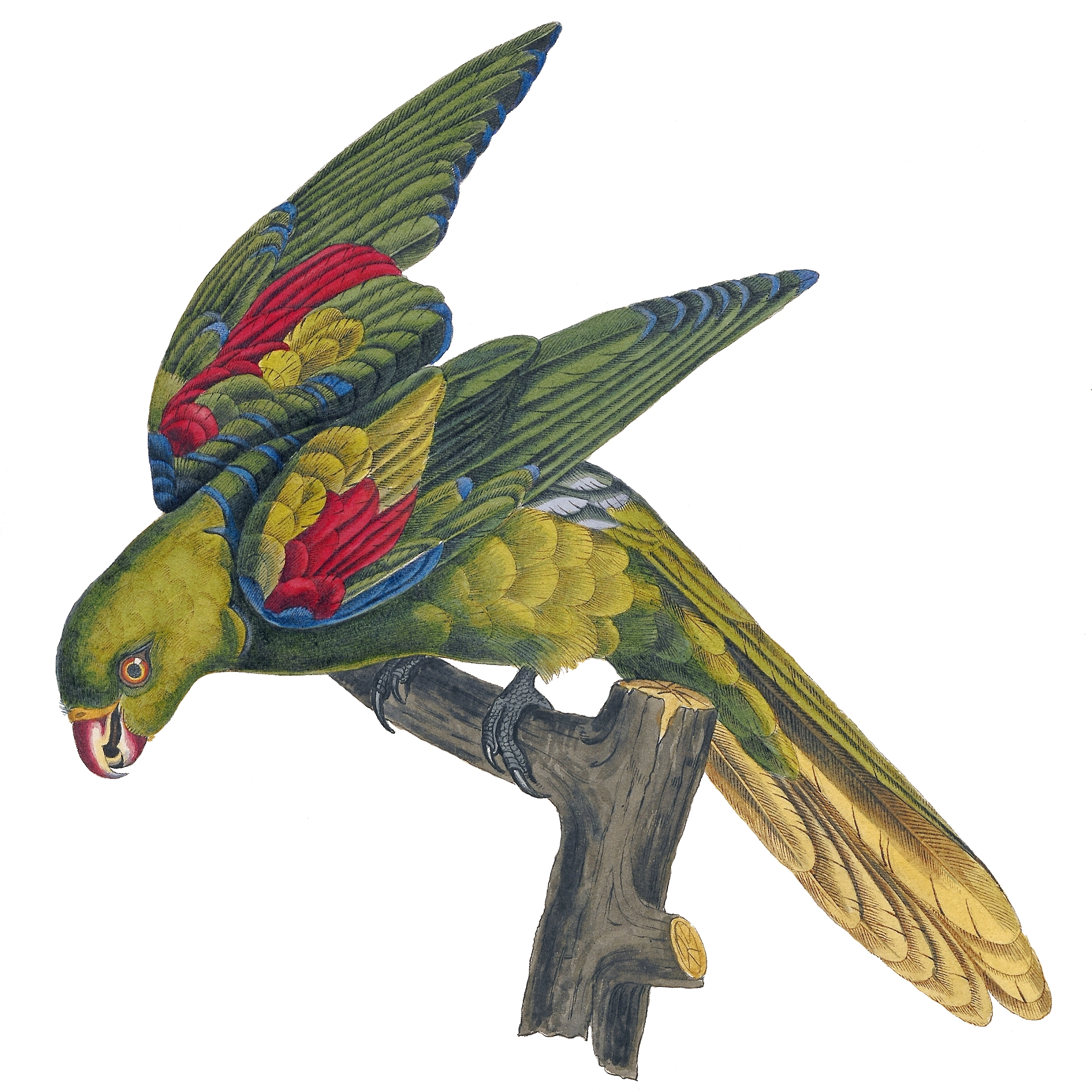

Conservation status
- Near Threatened (IUCN 3.1)

Scientific classification
- Kingdom: Animalia
- Phylum: Chordata
- Class: Aves
- Order: Psittaciformes
- Family: Psittaculidae
- Genus: Aprosmictus
- Species: A. jonquillaceus

Binomial name
- Aprosmictus jonquillaceus (Vieillot, 1818)

= Jonquil parrot =

Species of bird

The Jonquil parrot (Aprosmictus jonquillaceus) is a species of bird in the Psittaculidae family with two subspecies, Aprosmictus jonquillaceus jonquillaceus and Aprosmictus jonquillaceus wetterensis. It is a large, long-tailed green parrot with an orange bill and a wing patch which red in males and yellow in females. It is visible when a bird is perched and in flight. The juvenile looks like a female but lacks a wing patch.

== Habitat and distribution ==
- Single birds or small flocks of 3 to 5 individuals can be found in forest, woodland, and acacia savanna on the Indonesian islands of Rote, Timor, and Wetar.
- Restricted range; Near Threatened

== Behavior ==
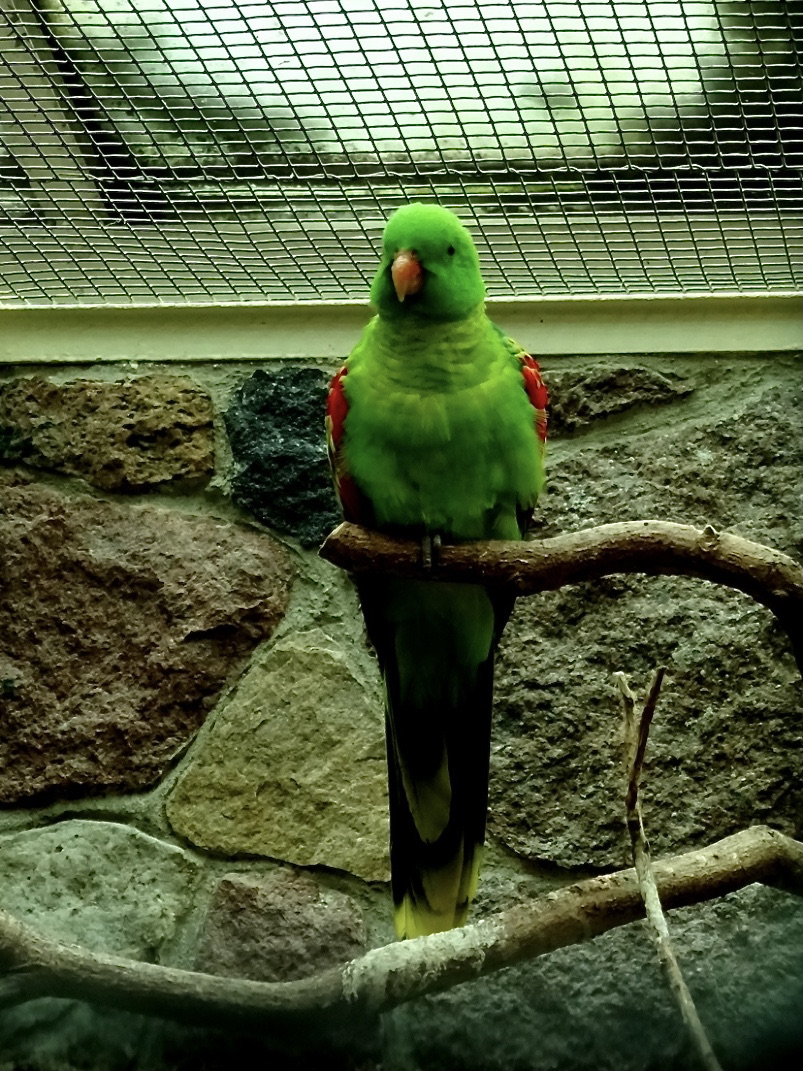

=== Vocalizations ===
Produces a loud, shrill screech, as well as lower-pitched "kraak-kraaak" cries, and high-pitched tinkling noises (see external links for recording).

=== Diet ===
Wild diet is likely to be similar to that of the red-winged parrot: seeds, fruit, flowers, and insects. In mangroves, mistletoe is favoured. Red-winged parrots were found to feed on the pods and seeds of various Acacia tree species. So, it is likely that the Jonquil parrot feeds on them too.

=== Reproduction ===
Trapping continues and the primary trapping season coincides with the breeding season, so one can guess that many more birds are removed from the population than those trapped; many young might die in the nest if their parents are caught.

Due to their remote habitat and near threatened status due to trapping and the exotic bird trade, not much information is known about the breeding of the Jonquil parrot in the wild. But, it is assumed that the Jonquil parrots shares similar breeding habits with the Red-winged parrot, which breeds from spring to early in the summer once a year.

Breeding parrots is a common occurrence. Breeders of the Timor red-winged parrot gives more insight to the breeding process:

Parrots often have to be surgically sexed in order to visualize a bird's ovary (female) or testicle (male). This is done because, in some cases, it can take up to four years for male and female parrots to be visibly distinguishable. The female will lay 4 to 5 eggs per clutch. After 20 to 30 days of incubation, the chicks hatch. The male feeds the female who feeds the chicks. The chicks are weaned by eight weeks old. They live an average of 11–14 years
