= Selapiu Island =

Island in Papua New Guinea

Coordinates: 2°41′S 150°32′E

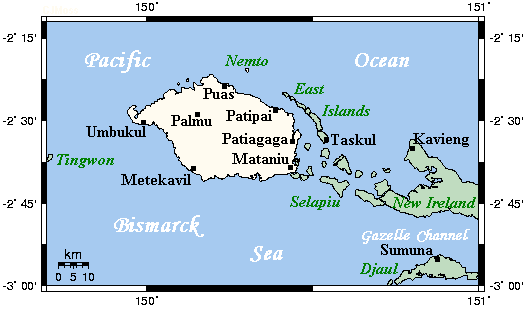
Selapiu Island is to the southeast of New Hanover Island

Selapiu Island is an island of Papua New Guinea, located immediately south of the corner of New Hanover Island. According to the United States Naval Oceanographic Office, a "cylindrical concrete beacon, surmounted by a pole and a square, 23 feet (7 m) high, marks the south edge of the reef that extends from the east extremity of Selapiu Island." Its highest point is 409 feet (125 m).
