= Canudos State Park =

State park in Bahia, Brazil

- Parque Estadual de Canudos
- IUCN category II (national park)
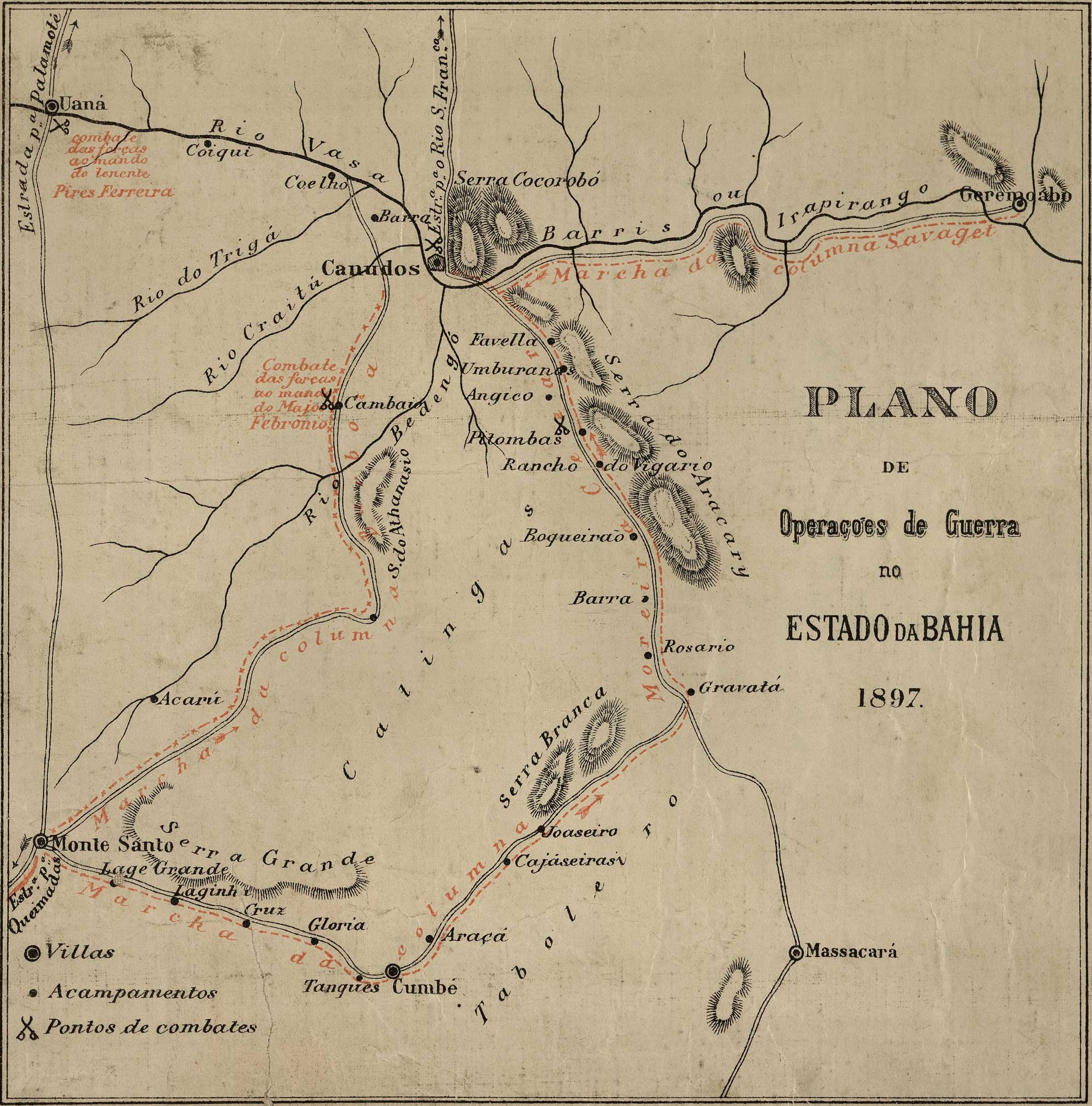
- Map of the location of the fighting. The northern part is now flooded by the Cocorobó Dam

- Location within Brazil
- Nearest city: Canudos, Bahia
- Coordinates: 9.935328°S 39.094927°W
- Area: 1,321 hectares (3,260 acres)
- Designation: State park
- Created: 30 June 1986
- Administrator: Secretaria de Meio Ambiente e Recursos Hídricos (BA)

The Canudos State Park (Portuguese: Parque Estadual de Canudos) is a state park in Bahia, Brazil. It protects the area of the War of Canudos, where peasants of mixed blood were massacred by Republican soldiers in 1896–97.

== Location ==
The Canudos State Park is in the municipality of Canudos, Bahia, and has an area of 1,321 hectares (3,260 acres). It is about 410 kilometres (250 mi) from the state capital of Salvador. The park entrance is reached from highway BR-235 by a paved road. From the highest point there is a panorama of the Cocorobó Dam.

== History ==
The present town of Canudos is the third of that name. The first was destroyed by the army. The inhabitants rebuilt a town on the ruins, but it was destroyed by the Cocorobó Dam, built by the military regime in the 1960s with the dual purpose of providing water for the region and erasing history. The vacant land was acquired by decree 33.193 of 27 May 1986, and the Canudos State Park was established by decree 33.333 of 30 June 1986. The decree authorized the Department of Education and Culture, through the Bahia State University (UNEB), to adopt the measures necessary for the park's construction. The stated purpose of the park is to make it impossible to forget the martyrs led by Antônio Conselheiro.

== Environment ==
The area is dry and hot all year. Vegetation is caatinga, characterized by species with few leaves and many thorns, particularly cacti and bromeliads. When it rains the empty riverbeds suddenly fill with water but are sometimes dry again a few hours later, leaving pools where the animals drink. The Vaza-Barris River was like this until the Cocorobó Dam was built. This was the difficult environment where Conselheiro and his followers lived.

Intensive research carried out by the Canudos Project, co-funded by UNEB and the Fundação de Amparo à Pesquisa do Estado da Bahia (FAPESB), found about 120 species of plants native to the caatinga biome. The majority of plants were pau-de-rato (Caesalpinia pyramidalis). UNEB and the Companhia Hidrelétrica do São Francisco (CHESF) have planted about 1,000 seedlings of native plants, and plan to plant over 10,000 seedlings.

== Exhibits ==
The Canudos State Park is in the area where the War of Canudos was fought, and has valuable historical, archaeological and anthropological sites, serving as an open air museum. It is structured to support historical tourism and research, with a photographic exhibition, relics, maps and signs. The park has a 5 kilometres (3.1 mi) trail that leads past strategic points associated with the bloody 19th century battles. Signs describe the sites of military camps, hospitals, cemeteries of the soldiers and of Antônio Conselheiro's followers, and trenches occupied by the combatants.

The park includes the Vale da Morte, where the soldiers buried their dead, the Vale da Degola and the Alto do Maio, where the commander of the third expedition Colonel Antônio Moreira César (1850–97) died. The graves in the Vale da Morte are shallow, and erosion uncovers the bones. Although measures have been taken to protect the sites, the ground is littered with old rifle bullets, shrapnel and pieces of pottery, which are vulnerable to tourists looking for souvenirs. A photographic exhibition has glass panels up to 4 metres (13 ft) high with photographs of the war and its aftermath, as well as the map of the region and engravings of the country.

== Sources ==
- Neto, Ricardo Bonalume (14 June 1997), "Inaugurado parque estadual de Canudos", Folha de S.Paulo (in Portuguese)
- "Parque Estadual de Canudos", Bahia.com (in Portuguese)
- "Parque Estadual de Canudos", Canudos.net (in Portuguese)
- "Parque Estadual de Canudos ganha "nova vida"", Euclidesdacunha.com (in Portuguese), Ascom, 4 August 2012
- Parque Estadual de Canudos – PEC (in Portuguese), UNEB: Universidade do Estado da Bahia
- PES de Canudos (in Portuguese), ISA: Instituto Socioambiental
