= 1897 in Brazil =

Events in the year 1897 in Brazil.

== Incumbents ==
=== Federal government ===
- President: Prudente de Morais
- Vice-President: Manuel Vitorino

=== Governors ===
- Alagoas:
  - until June 12: José Vieira Peixoto
  - from June 12: Manuel José Duarte
- Amazonas: Fileto Pires Ferreira
- Bahia: Luís Viana
- Ceará: Antônio Nogueira Accioli
- Goiás: Francisco Leopoldo Rodrigues Jardim
- Maranhão:
  - until March 26: Casimiro Vieira Jr
  - from March 26: Alfredo Martins
- Mato Grosso: Manuel José Murtinho
- Minas Gerais: Bias Fortes
- Pará:
  - until February 1: Lauro Sodré
  - from February 1: Pais de Carvalho
- Paraíba: Antônio Alfredo Mello
- Paraná: Santos Andrade
- Pernambuco: Joaquim Correia de Araújo
- Piauí: Raimundo Artur de Vasconcelos
- Rio Grande do Norte: Joaquim Ferreira Chaves
- Rio Grande do Sul: Júlio de Castilhos
- Santa Catarina: Hercílio Luz
- São Paulo:
  - until October 31: Campos Sales
  - from October 31: Peixoto Gomide
- Sergipe: Martinho Garcez

=== Vice governors ===
- Rio de Janeiro:
- Rio Grande do Norte:
- São Paulo:

== Events ==
- 6 January – An expeditionary force, consisting of 557 soldiers and officers under the command of Major Febrônio de Brito, who attacks the well-defended village of Canudos. The troops are eventually forced to retreat when confronted with more than 4,000 insurrectionists.
- 7 August – Euclides da Cunha goes to the sertão ("backland"), as war correspondent for O Estado de S. Paulo.
- 2 October – the War of Canudos comes to a brutal end, when a large Brazilian army force overruns the village and kills nearly all the inhabitants.
- 12 October – The city of Belo Horizonte is created and its construction is completely successfully.
- 5 November – President Prudente de Morais suffers an assassination attempt during a ceremony at the War Arsenal (currently the building of the National Historical Museum) in Rio de Janeiro.

== Births ==
- 6 February – Alberto Cavalcanti, film director and producer (died 1982)
- 30 April – Humberto Mauro, film director (died 1983)
- 7 June – Lampião, bandit (died 1938)
- 20 September – Humberto de Alencar Castelo Branco, politician (died 1967)
- 4 November – Oscar Lorenzo Fernández, composer (died 1948)

== Deaths ==
- 1 January – Adolfo Caminha, Naturalist novelist (born 1867; tuberculosis)
- 4 March – Antônio Moreira César, army colonel, killed in action
- 22 September – Antônio Conselheiro, religious leader, preacher, and founder of the village of Canudos (born 1830; dysentery)
- 13 November – Francisco de Paula Ney, poet and journalist (born 1858)
