= João Abade =

Brazilian rebel leader (died 1897)

João Abade (Note: Portuguese pronunciation: [ʒuˈɐ̃w̃ aˈbadʒi].) (Tucano, unknown date — Canudos, 1897) was one of the guerrilla leaders during the War of Canudos. He is considered to have been one of the most important leaders of the rebels in the war.

Abade led the village of Canudos before the arrival of Antônio Conselheiro and his entourage. In May 1893, he led the first clash between Conselheiro's followers and the Bahian state police, in Maceté.

In Canudos, he led the Catholic Guard, also called the Company of Good Jesus, which covered the security of Antônio Conselheiro and the defense of the settlement. He was called the "chefe do povo." ("Chief of the People") According to José Travessia, one of the war's survivors, Abade was "an upright man and with him there was no softness." In November 1896, he directed an attack against the 2nd Expedition of Lieutenant Pires Ferreira.

He died in the final phase of the war, wounded by a shrapnel fragment in the central square of the settlement.

Abade is a promiment character in the novel The War of the End of the World by Mario Vargas Llosa.
