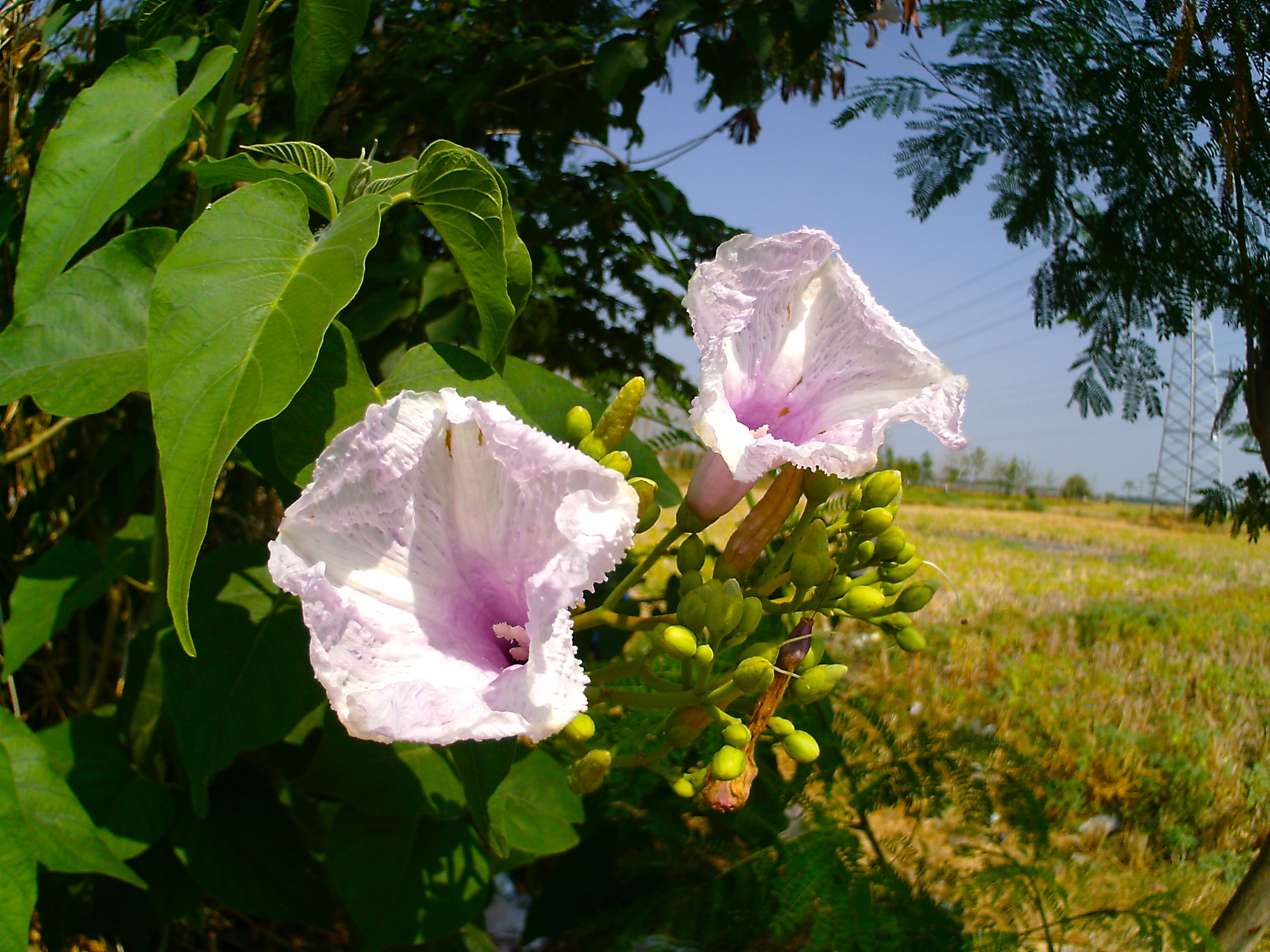

Scientific classification
- Kingdom: Plantae
- Clade: Tracheophytes
- Clade: Angiosperms
- Clade: Eudicots
- Clade: Asterids
- Order: Solanales
- Family: Convolvulaceae
- Genus: Ipomoea
- Species: I. carnea

Binomial name
- Ipomoea carnea Jacq., 1760

Synonyms
- Convolvulus batatilla Kunth, 1819; Ipomoea fistulosa Mart. ex Choisy, 1845; Batatas crassicaulis Benth., 1845; Ipomoea gossypioides Parodi, 1877; Ipomoea texana J.M.Coult., 1890; Ipomoea fruticosa Kuntze, 1891; Ipomoea fistulosa v. nicaraguensis Donnell Smith, 1894; Ipomoea fistulosa f. albiflora Chodat & Hassl., 1905; Ipomoea crassicaulis (Bentham) B. L. Robinson, 1916; Ipomoea crassicaulis v. goodellii O.Deg., 1936

= Ipomoea carnea =

Species of flowering plant

Ipomoea carnea, the pink morning glory, is a species of morning glory that grows as a bush. This flowering plant has heart-shaped leaves that are a rich green and 6–9 inches (15–23 cm) long. It can be easily grown from seeds. These seeds are toxic and it can be hazardous to cattle; the toxicity is related to the swainsonine produced by its endophytes, and to bioaccumulation of selenium in the leaves but mostly in the seeds. It has not been found as hyperaccumulator of iron. Ingestion of seeds or leaves causes abnormal endocrine functions and gastrointestinal functions, immune system alternation, abnormality in embryogenesis. I.carnea is native to Mexico, tropical and Central America and is considered as major invasive species in South Asia and considered as a major invasive species of wetlands in Nepal.

The stem of I. carnea can be used for making paper. The plant is also of medicinal value. It contains a component identical to marsilin, a sedative and anticonvulsant. A glycosidic saponin has also been purified from I. carnea with anticarcinogenic and oxytocic properties.

One selection of I. carnea, 'Inducer', has been used as a rootstock for inducing flowering of sweetpotato cultivars which otherwise prove reticent to produce flowers.

Another common name is "bush morning glory", but particularly in temperate North America, that usually refers to I. leptophylla.

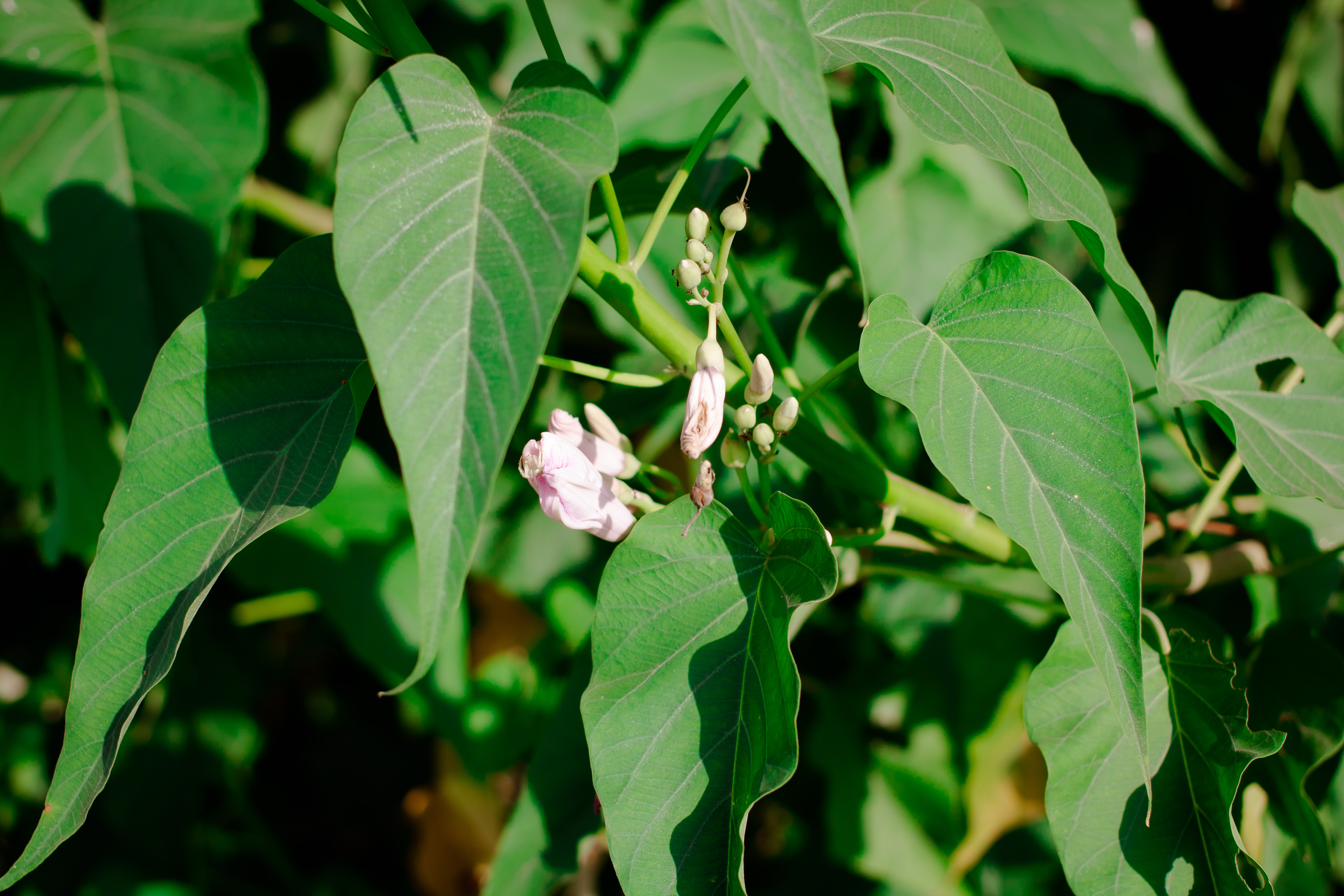
Ipomoea carnea leaves

In Brazil, I. carnea (in addition to other common names) is known as canudo-de-pito, literally "pipe-cane", as its hollow stems were used to make tubes for tobacco pipes. It thus became the namesake of Canudos, a religious community in the sertão of Bahia, over which the War of Canudos was fought 1893–1897.

Ipomoea carnea seeds have been used as an entheogen for their psychoactive effects by indigenous people in Ecuador. They are said to contain high levels of hallucinogenic ergoline alkaloids and to often be stronger than the seeds of Ipomoea tricolor.

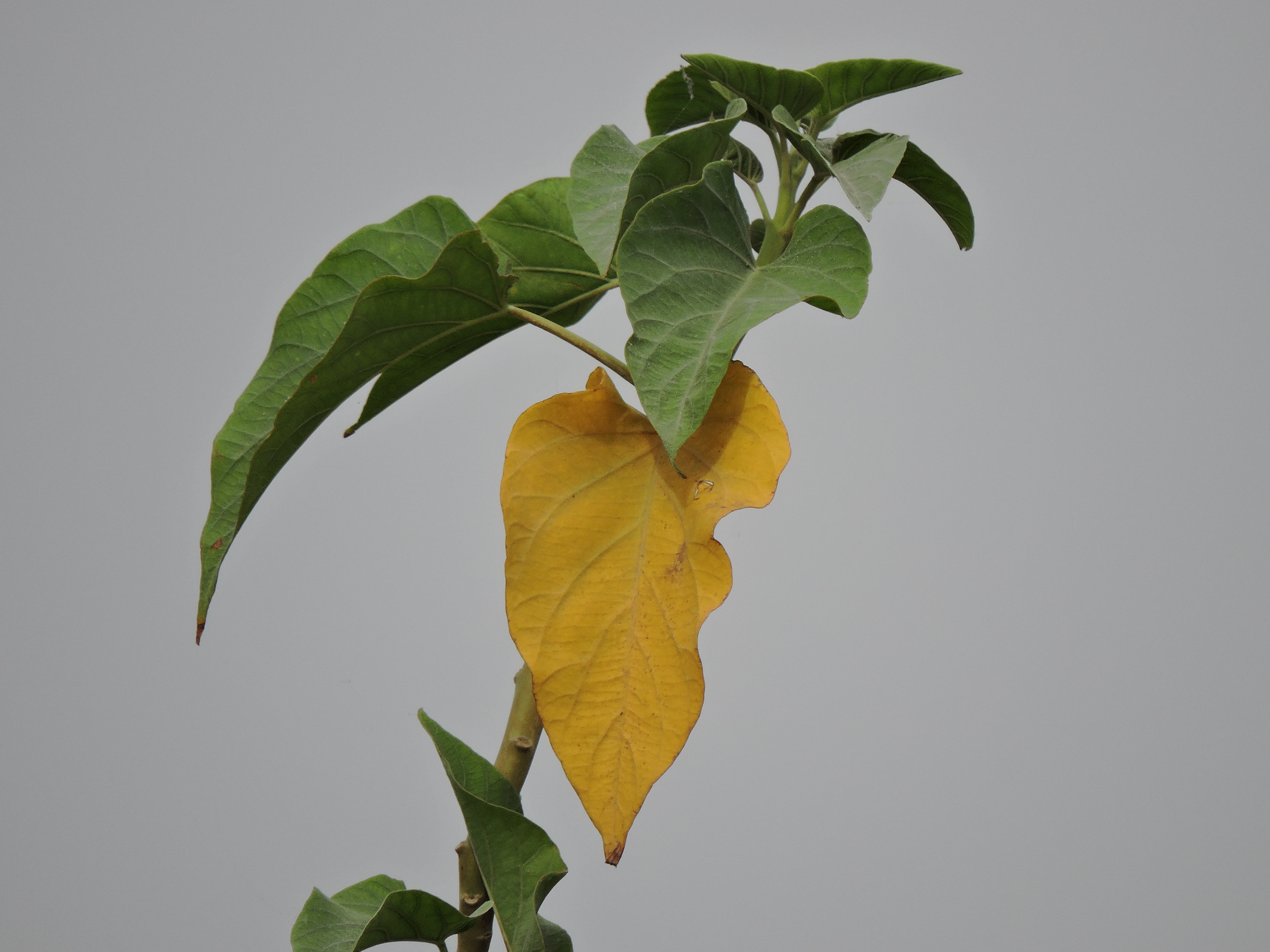
Leaves of an Ipomoea carnea plant.

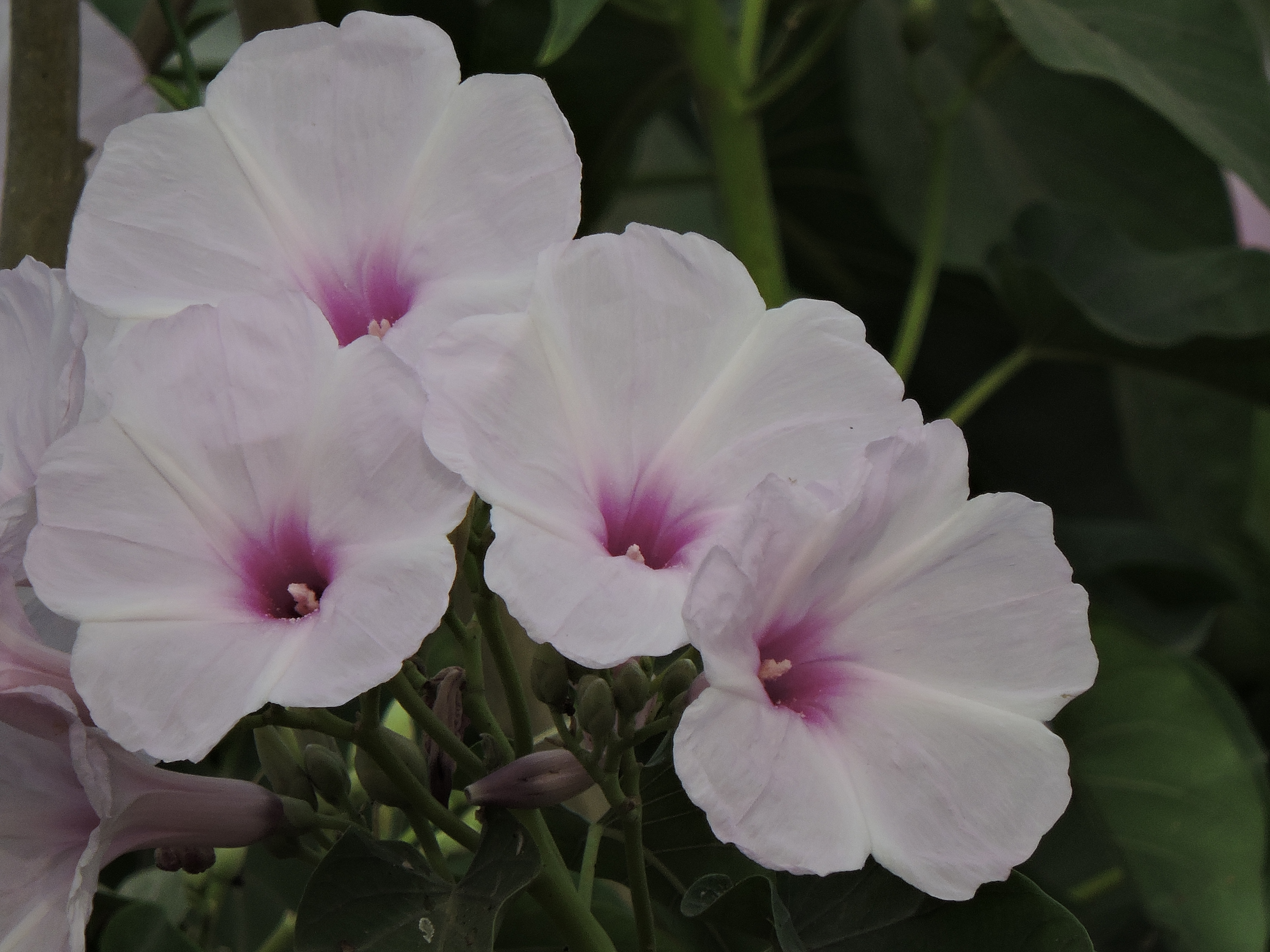
Ipomoea carnea flowers

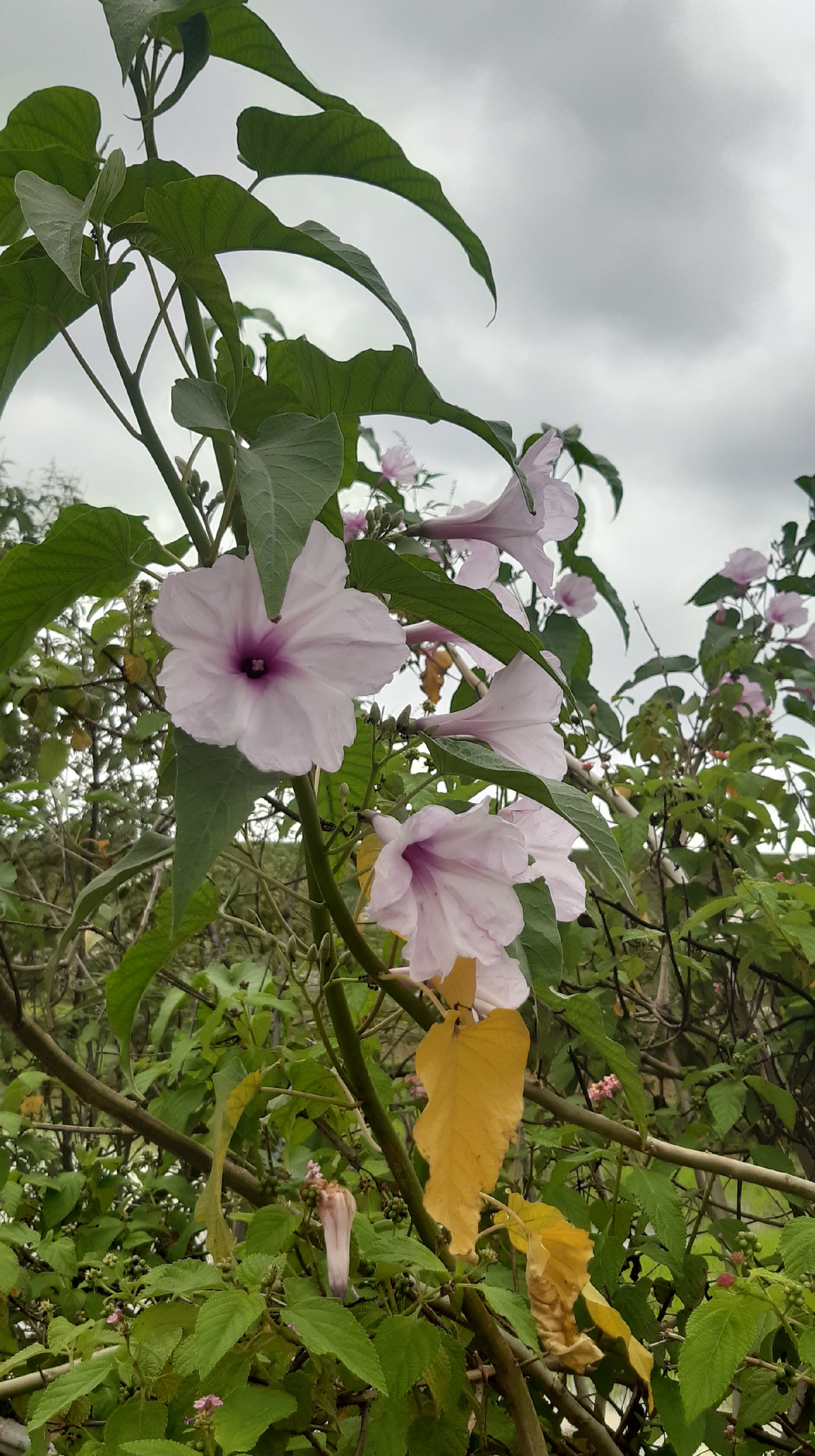
Flowers in Ranchi, India

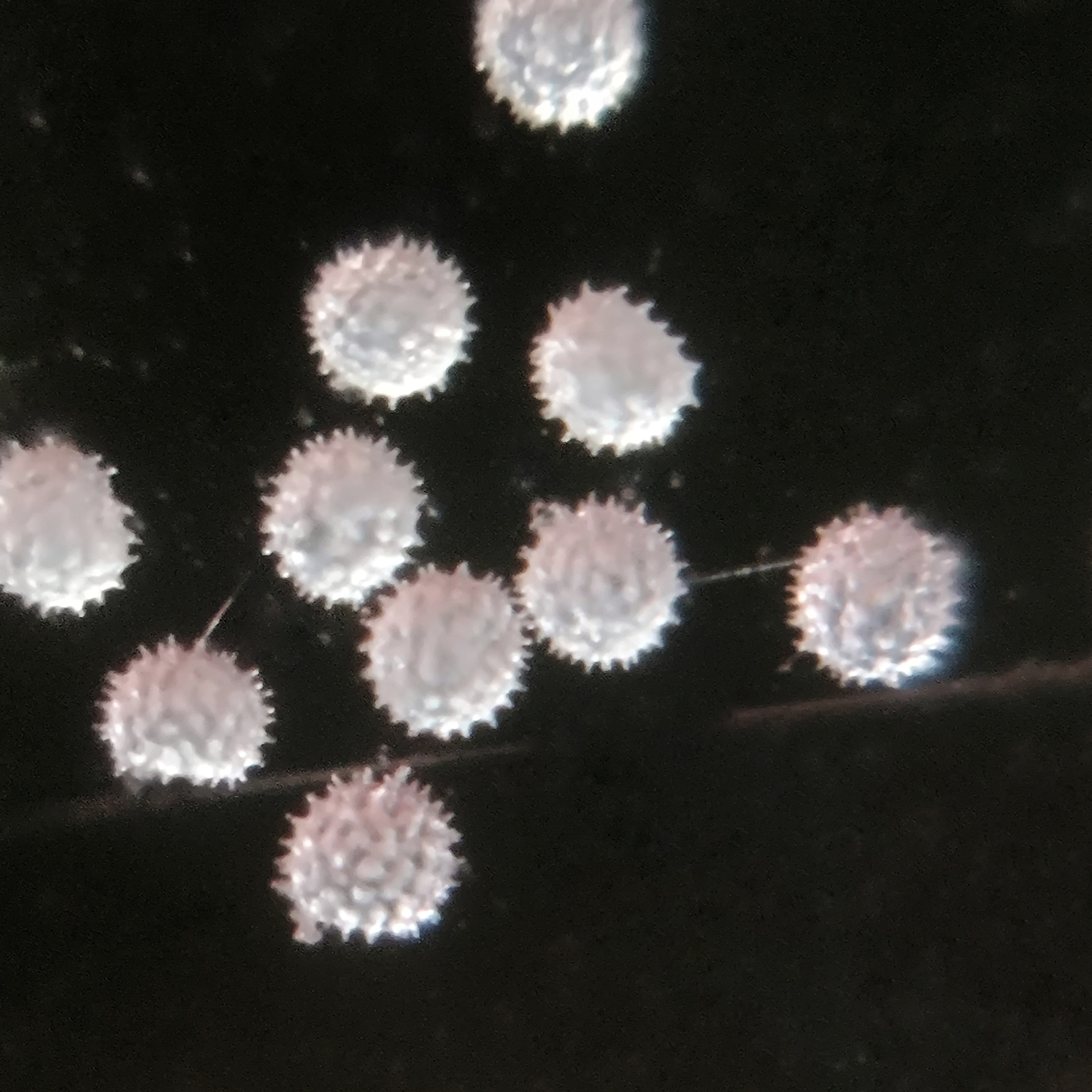
Pollen grains taken from plant in Bastar, Chhattisgarh, India

== See also ==
- Morning glory (drug)
