= Inffinito =

Brazilian organization

Inffinito is a Brazilian organization involved in the production, promotion and diffusion of Brazilian culture, most particularly films. It is responsible for Brazilian film festivals held in various cities around the world, including Miami (Brazilian Film Festival of Miami), New York, London, Vancouver and Canudos.

== Inffinito Brazilian Film Festival of Miami ==
The Miami festival has been held since 1997. The festival is said to be the most important Brazilian film event held outside Brazil.

== BRAFF London ==
The festival involves premiere screenings of Brazilian films at venues across London and public talks. The fifth edition took place in 2013.
