= Jagunço =

Brazilian armed bodyguard

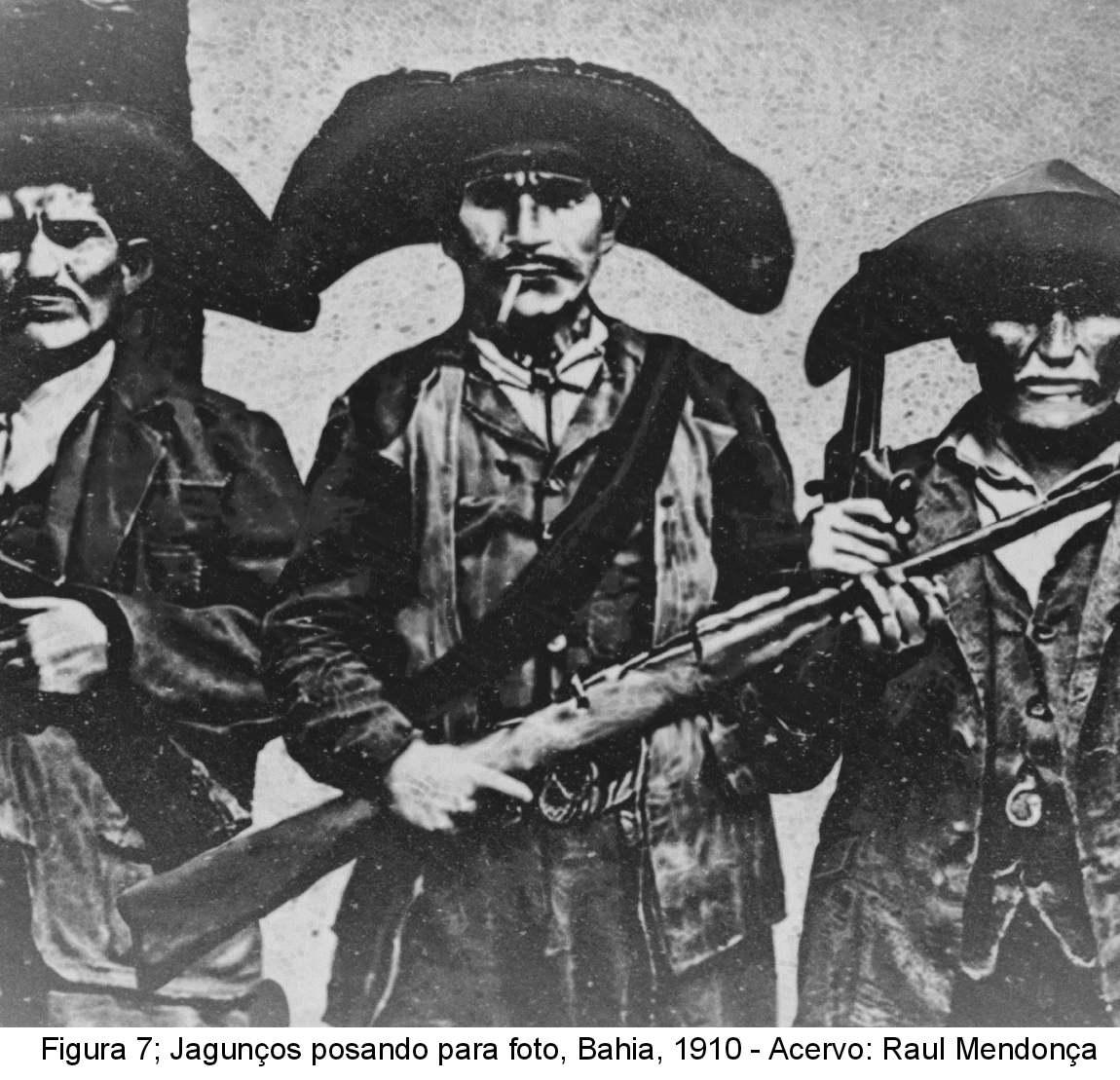
Jagunço posing for a photo, 1910, Bahia

A jagunço (Portuguese pronunciation: [ʒaˈɡũsu]), from the Portuguese zarguncho (a weapon of African origin, similar to a short lance or chuzo), is an armed band or bodyguard, usually hired by plantation owners and "colonels" in the backlands of Brazil, especially in Northeastern Brazil. They were hired to protect their employer, big land owner, against invaders and feudal enemies, and also to control their slaves and indentured servants. Some farmers formed their own private militias with a number of heavily armed jagunços. There were also free-lancing or mercenary jagunços, who could be hired for temporary conflicts, as vigilantes, or for contract murders. Local folklore says that jagunços with yellow eyes were particularly fearsome and efficient.

The term was later extended to name any kind of rural bandit or outlaw, such as the "cangaceiros" (of which Lampião is the most notorious example). It was also applied as a pejorative term for the inhabitants of Canudos, a village founded by the religious mystic and messianic leader Antônio Conselheiro in the backlands of the state of Bahia. The village was destroyed in October 1897 during the War of Canudos.

== See also ==
- Cangaço
- The Devil to Pay in the Backlands

== Sources ==
- Hobsbawm, Eric Bandits London, 1969.
- Chandler, Billy Jaynes. Bandit King: Lampião of Brazil Texas A&M University Press, 2000. ISBN 0890961948.
- Seal, Graham. Outlaw Heroes in Myth and History Anthem Press, 2011. ISBN 9780857287922.
- Waggoner, John Brazil Adventure Guide Hunter Publishing, Inc. 2008. ISBN 9781588436399.
