= Os Sertões =

1902 non-fiction book by Euclides da Cunha

Rebellion in the Backlands
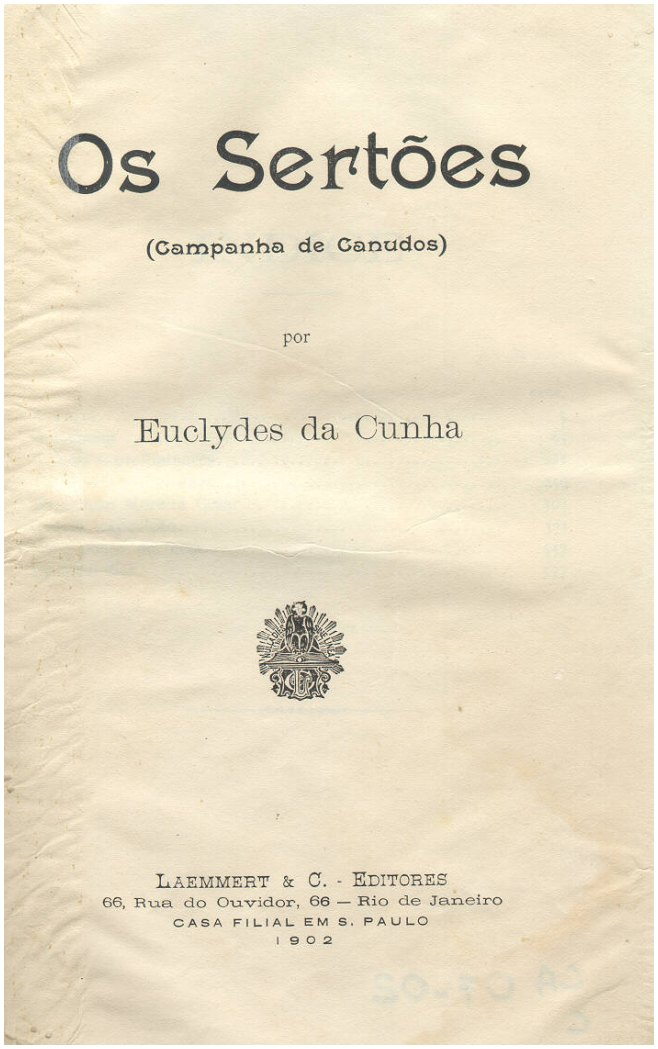
- Title page of first edition (paperback)
- Author: Euclides da Cunha
- Original title: Os Sertões
- Translator: Samuel Putnam
- Language: Portuguese
- Publication date: 1902
- Publication place: Brazil
- English publication date: 1957

Os Sertões (Portuguese: [us seʁˈtõjʃ], "the backlands"; 1902), translated as Rebellion in the Backlands, is a book written by the Brazilian author Euclides da Cunha. Mixing science and literature, the author narrates the true story of a war that happened at the end of the 19th century in Canudos, a settlement of Bahia's Sertão ("backland"), an extremely arid region where, even now, struggles against poverty, drought and political corruption continue. During the war (1893–1897) against the republican army, the sertanejos (inhabitants of the backlands) were commanded by a messianic leader called Antônio Conselheiro.

== Synopsis ==
Influenced by theories like positivism and social Darwinism from the end of the 19th century, Cunha discussed the forming of a new Brazilian republican nation and also its racial composition and its promising future of progress and civilization.

The book is originally divided into three parts: 1) "A Terra" (The Land), which portrays the northeastern backland and the physical setting of the war. 2) "O Homem" (The Man) exposes the land's inhabitants and their race composition, explaining the individual by its phenotype and emphasizing the opposition between the coast and the backlands men. Here Cunha utilizes much of the racial and psychiatric theories then in vogue to explain the backwardness and "objectified insanity" of the sertanejos. 3) "A Luta" (The Rebellion), which narrates the conflict between the republican army and the sertanejos who, despite being considered "racially degenerate", succeed in winning many battles, even though they lost the war.

Throughout the book, Cunha seems to have sympathy for the oppressed sertanejos and to doubt the progress and modernity of republican ideals. Through their conflict with the Canudos commune, the forces of modernity and progress are revealed to be just as irrational as their supposedly "uncivilized" opponents and the legitimacy of the republic is shaken at its foundations. Os Sertões is considered one of the most important Brazilian works from this historical period, an effort to represent the nation as a totality. Despite its outdated scientific and historical ideas, Cunha's book is a cornerstone of Brazilian literary and political culture.

== Legacy ==
In 1981, a literary retelling of the War of Canudos was written by Peruvian novelist Mario Vargas Llosa as The War of the End of the World. Vargas Llosa dedicated this novel to Cunha and included him as a prominent character in the novel.
