= Cocorobó Dam =

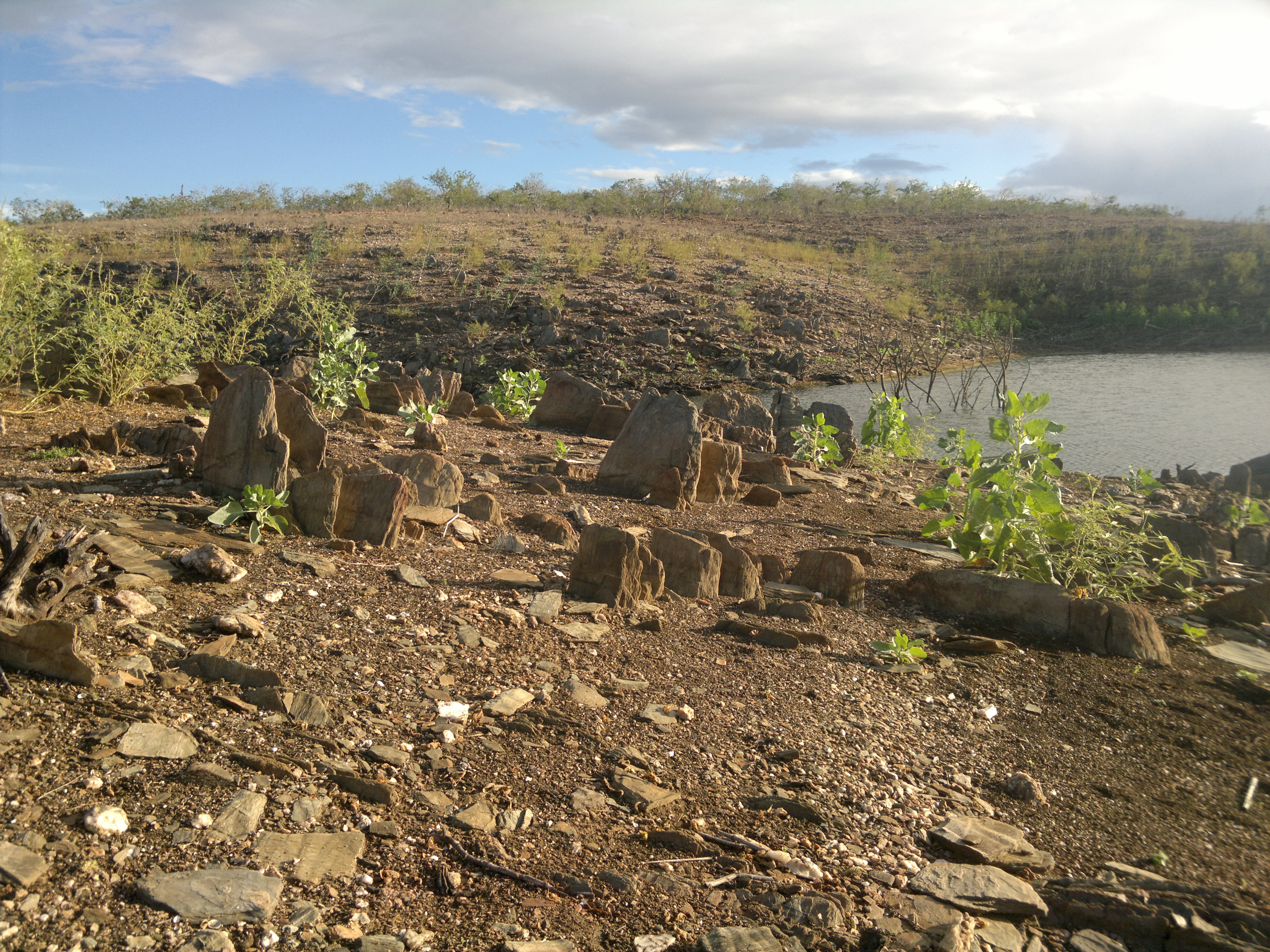
- Land normally submerged by the dam, during a low water period

- Location within Brazil
- Official name: Açude Cocorobó
- Country: Brazil
- Location: Canudos, Bahia
- Coordinates: 9.882744°S 39.039097°W
- Purpose: Water storage
- Status: Active
- Construction began: 1951
- Opening date: December 1967
- Owner: DNOCS

Dam and spillways
- Type of dam: Earth fill
- Impounds: Vaza-Barris River
- Height (thalweg): 33.5 metres (110 ft)
- Length: 643 metres (2,110 ft)
- Elevation at crest: 362 metres (1,188 ft)
- Width (crest): 7 metres (23 ft)
- Width (base): 90 metres (300 ft)
- Spillway capacity: 1,824 cubic metres per second (64,400 cu ft/s)

Reservoir
- Total capacity: 245,000,000 cubic metres (8.7×10^{9} cu ft)
- Catchment area: 3,600 square kilometres (1,400 sq mi)
- Surface area: 2,395 hectares (5,920 acres)

The Cocorobó Dam (/ˌkoʊkərəˈboʊ/; Portuguese: Açude Cocorobó) is a dam in the state of Bahia, Brazil. It provides a reservoir of water for irrigation and drinking in the arid caatinga environment of the Raso da Catarina. The reservoir covers the ruins of the city of Canudos, scene of the War of Canudos in 1896–97.

== Location ==
The Cocorobó Dam is in the Raso da Catarina region of the driest part of Bahia. The dam is about 410 kilometres (250 mi) from the state capital, Salvador, near the junction of highways BR-116 and BR-225. It is in the municipality of Canudos. The Vaza Barria project, which built the dam, was to irrigate 460 hectares (1,100 acres), control floods, support fish farming and supply water to the town of Nova Canudos. The dam is owned by the Departamento Nacional de Obras Contras as Secas (DNOCS).

The reservoir submerged the ruined city of Canudos, location of the War of Canudos (1896–97). This was apparently a deliberate effort to erase memories of the suppression of a popular revolt by the republican army in 1896–97. However, the Canudos State Park, created in 1986 to the south of the dam, preserves key sites of the war. The stated purpose of the park is to make it impossible to forget the martyrs led by Antônio Conselheiro.

== Reservoir ==
The dam impounds the Vaza-Barris River. The river's watershed above the dam drains an area of 3,600 square kilometres (1,400 sq mi). Average annual rainfall is 477 millimetres (18.8 in), with annual runoff of 97 x 106 cubic metres (3,700 cu ft). The river bed in the reservoir is covered by sandy alluvial deposits with pockets of silt. The shale sub-strata are massive, only moderately fractured and have low permeability. The reservoir covers an area of 2,395 hectares (5,920 acres) with a volume of 245,375,950 cubic metres (8.665370×10^{9} cu ft). In September 2014 the reservoir was holding only 20% of capacity after a prolonged drought.

== Dam structure ==
The dam is a fan-shaped earth dam with a sand-clay core, with the slope protected by riprap. The stony aggregate material and artificial sand were derived from quartzite on the right bank of the river beside the dam. The dam has a maximum height of 33.5 metres (110 ft), with a length of 643 metres (2,110 ft). The base of the dam is 90 metres (300 ft) wide. The crest is 7 metres (23 ft) wide at an altitude of 362 metres (1,188 ft).

The spillway ends in a fall and a dissipating basin at an altitude of 332.5 metres (1,091 ft). It is covered in reinforced concrete, and designed to handle 1,824 cubic metres per second (64,400 cu ft/s). The water intake structure has a tower and twin tubes with 1 metre (3 ft 3 in) diameter. The water intake has twin 1 metre (3 ft 3 in) diameter tubes coated in reinforced concrete. It is dimensioned for flow of 4.6 cubic metres per second (160 cu ft/s). It is controlled by two flat sluices upstream and manual control valves downstream.

== Construction ==
Construction began in 1951, directly managed by DNOCS. Between 1951 and 1966 600,000 cubic metres (21,000,000 cu ft) of landfill was excavated, or 48% of the total. In 1967 the dam reached its full volume, with 650 cubic metres (23,000 cu ft) of compacted landfill. Soon after the dam was completed in December 1967 part of the embankment slipped, with about 45,000 cubic metres (1,600,000 cu ft) moving about 100 metres (330 ft). This was repaired, and instruments installed to monitor the embankment, Some cracks appeared, and piezometric pressures were considered high. However, after further observations and analysis the dam was considered acceptable.

== Sources ==
- Açude Cocorobó (in Portuguese), DNOCS
- Beal, S. (2013-09-18), Brazil under Construction: Fiction and Public Works, Palgrave Macmillan US, ISBN 978-1-137-32248-7
- "Cocorobó Dam", IndustryAbout.com, archived from the original on November 4, 2016
- "Lampião e Conselheiro no Raso da Catarina", Bahia! (in Portuguese), archived from the original on 2016-10-23
- Neto, Ricardo Bonalume (14 June 1997), "Inaugurado parque estadual de Canudos", Folha de S.Paulo (in Portuguese)
- Parracho, Lunae (22 September 2014), Not a drop to drink, Reuters
