= The War of the End of the World =

1981 novel by Mario Vargas Llosa

- First Spanish edition (publ. Seix Barral)
- Author: Mario Vargas Llosa
- Original title: La guerra del fin del mundo
- Translators: Helen R. Lane
- Genre: Historical fiction
- Publisher: Seix Barral
- Publication date: October 1, 1981
- Award: PEN Translation Prize for Prose; Nobel Prize in Literature (2010)

The War of the End of the World (Spanish: La guerra del fin del mundo) is a 1981 novel written by Peruvian novelist Mario Vargas Llosa, who won the 2010 Nobel Prize in Literature. It is a fictionalized account of the War of Canudos conflict in late 19th-century Brazil.

== Plot summary ==
In the midst of the economic decline — following a devastating drought and the end of slavery — in the province of Bahia in Northeastern Brazil, the poor of the backlands are attracted by the charismatic figure and simple religious teachings of Antônio Conselheiro, called "The Counselor", who preaches that the end of the world is imminent and that the political chaos that surrounds the collapse of the Empire of Brazil and its replacement by a republic is the work of the devil.

Seizing a fazenda in an area blighted by economic decline at Canudos the Counselor's followers build a large town and repeatedly defeat growing military expeditions designed to remove them. As the state's violence against them increases, they too turn increasingly violent, even seizing the modern weapons deployed against them. In an epic final clash, a whole army is sent to extirpate Canudos and instigates a terrible and brutal battle with the poor while politicians of the old order see their world destroyed in the conflagration.

== Analysis ==
It is generally believed that Vargas Llosa's five milestone novels are La Ciudad y los Perros (The Time of the Hero), La Casa Verde (The Green House), Conversación en La Catedral (Conversation in The Cathedral), The War of the End of the World and La Fiesta del Chivo (The Feast of the Goat). By 1990, the author considered The War of the End of the World his most accomplished novel — an opinion shared by the Chilean novelist Roberto Bolaño, as well as the American critic Harold Bloom, who includes the novel in what he calls the "Western canon".

As he did later on with The Feast of the Goat, Vargas Llosa tackles a huge number of characters and stories caught during a time of strife, interweaving these in way that paints a picture of what it was to live in those times.

== Characters ==
=== Historical ===
- Antônio Conselheiro: Doomsday prophet and spiritual leader of Canudos
- João Abade (Abbot João): Cangaço leader turned military commander for the Counselor
- Colonel Antônio Moreira César: Republican loyalist and leader of the third expedition against Canudos
- Lieutenant Pires Ferreira: veteran of several expeditions against the rebels

=== Fictional ===
- The Little Blessed One, the Lion of Natuba, Maria Quadrado, and Antônio Vilanova: Devoted followers of the Counselor
- Big João and Pajeú: Military leaders in Canudos
- Rufino and Jurema: Sertanejo couple living in Queimadas
- Galileo Gall: Idealist revolutionary and phrenologist
- The nearsighted journalist: An unnamed character who travels with the third expedition
- The Dwarf and the Bearded Lady: Members of a traveling circus troupe
- Baron de Canabrava: The wealthy owner of vast holdings in the sertão
- Estela and Sebastiana: the Baron de Canabrava's wife and her lady-in-waiting, respectively

== Critical reception ==
In Publishers Weekly, Adriana Lopez wrote: "This historical novel, based on actual occurrences with plenty of fabulistic legends throughout, is delivered in Vargas Llosa's witty and objective journalistic tone. Vargas Llosa, who is so good at bringing to life the human faults of history's fanatics and dictators, captivates the deranged world of the charismatic Counselor."

In a review of the 1984 English translation, Kirkus Reviews found that "though much of this novel is surprisingly drab and flat, the extraordinarily punishing, unremitting scenes of battle and carnage bring the book's lesson home all too vividly: the madness that can horribly grow out of any small fanaticism and power-base."

In a 1985 edition of The London Review of Books, Philip Horne said: "The novel's great attraction lies in its combination of the oppressive physical immediacy with which it contemplates the horrific particulars of countless struggles for life in the sertão and the subtlety with which its scheme makes these remote things matter. Like the best 19th-century novels, it satisfies both our sceptical and our credulous impulses, our preference for true history and our desire for good stories; and almost satisfies our greatest wish in this area – that true history and good story should be one and the same."

== Awards ==
Awards for The War of the End of the World
Year	Award	Result	Ref.
1985	PEN Translation Prize for Prose for Helen R. Lane	Winner	
2010	Nobel Prize in Literature	Winner	
