= Antônio Conselheiro =

Brazilian preacher (1830–1897)

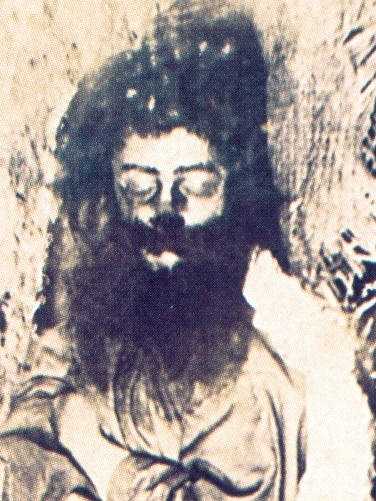
- The only known photograph of Antônio Conselheiro, taken after his death in September 1897
- Born: Antônio Vicente Mendes Maciel; 13 March 1830; Quixeramobim, Ceará, Empire of Brazil
- Died: 22 September 1897 (aged 67); Canudos, Bahia, First Brazilian Republic
- Other names: Antônio Conselheiro; Santo Conselheiro; Bom Jesus o Peregrino (the Pilgrim)

Antônio Conselheiro, in English "Anthony the Counselor", real name Antônio Vicente Mendes Maciel (13 March 1830 – 22 September 1897), was a Brazilian religious leader, preacher and founder of the village of Canudos, the scene of the War of Canudos (1896–1897), a civil rebellion against the central government which was brutally stamped out with the loss of more than 25,000 lives.

== Biography ==
=== Early life ===
Born in Quixeramobim, Antônio Maciel was the son of Maria Joaquina de Jesus and Vicente Mendes Maciel, who headed a moderately successful business in the sertão ("backlands"), the semi-arid zone of the Brazilian Northeast. His infancy was marked by a bloody feud with the powerful family of the Araújos, causing many deaths in both families, following the tragic cycle of vengeance and honour which were so common in these regions. After the death of his mother in 1834, his father married again, and Antônio and his two sisters suffered with the father's alcoholism and maltreatment by their stepmother. Antônio went to study with his grandfather, Manoel Antônio Ferreira Nobre, who was a teacher in Quixeramobim. He developed well as a serious, quiet and hard-working pupil, studying Latin, French, Portuguese, mathematics, geography and history. In 1855 his father died and he assumed the family's business, striving to get his sisters married. In 1857, Antônio himself married Brasilina Laurentina de Lima and began working as a salesman, teacher and lay counselor (poorman's lawyer). Already with two children, he was cheated on by his wife in 1861, and disillusioned and depressed, he separated from them and retired to a farm, working as a rural teacher, and devoting himself more and more to Christian mysticism. Moving again to Santa Quitéria, Ceará, he had a third child, a son named Joaquim Aprígio, after a brief affair with a local artist named Joana Imaginária. He was restless, however, and started to wander around the country, from 1865 to 1869, and then from 1871 and afterwards.

=== The Counsellor ===
Antônio Maciel was tall and thin, with long black hair and a beard. He wore a rough blue tunic, a straw hat and leather sandals, and carried a wooden cross around his neck. As he travelled through the region, he preached and offered guidance to poor communities. He became known by several names, including Antônio Conselheiro, Santo Antônio dos Mares, Santo Antônio Aparecido and Bom Jesus Conselheiro. Over time, he attracted followers who accompanied him on his travels.

=== Trouble with law and Church ===
In 1874, Antônio Conselheiro began to attract the attention of authorities and the Catholic Church, due to his preaching to the oppressed and poor peasants and common folk of small villages and farms. In 1876 he was arrested by the police in Itapicuru, Bahia, under the suspicion of being a wanted criminal. After being identified, he was sent by ship to Fortaleza. He was severely beaten, his hair and beard were cut and he was sent back for trial to his city of origin, Quixeramobim. The local judge, however, released Antônio Conselheiro due to the absence of any criminal charges against him. Antônio returned immediately to Bahia and restarted his wandering and preaching. He vowed to construct 21 churches and proceeded to do so in 12 cities in the backlands of the provinces of Bahia and Sergipe, as well as cemeteries and small dams.

In 1877, one of the periodical catastrophic droughts began in the Northeast. It would last two years killing more than 300,000 peasants by hunger and thirst, creating havoc with the predominantly semi-arid agrarian economy of the region. Many villages were entirely abandoned and instances of cannibalism even occurred. Antônio Conselheiro and his followers did what they could to diminish the extreme suffering of the poor people, adding more and more admirers and followers to his group. The sense of an impending end of the world and that the only salvation could come through religion were strong incentives to the surge of religious fanaticism. Conselheiro was widely regarded as a saint and a Messiah. Due to his increasing criticism of the official Church, and his open preachings in the small churches of the backlands, in 1882 the Archbishop of Bahia issued an order forbidding priests to allow him access to the flocks and characterising Antônio Conselheiro as an apostate and as a madman.

=== The abolition of slavery and the proclamation of the Republic ===
In 1888 and 1889, Brazil went through the most revolutionary and far-reaching social, economic and political changes of its history since Europeans settled in 1500. On 13 May 1888, slavery was abolished by the ruling Emperor, Dom Pedro II, by an act signed by his daughter, Princess Isabel. More than five million black people were suddenly free, and they abandoned the farms and swelled enormously the rural and urban ranks of extremely poor inhabitants. Tens of thousands of farmers went bankrupt and agriculture almost stopped for a while, particularly for cash crops which required intensive labor, such as coffee, cotton, tobacco and sugarcane, the mainstays of the Brazilian economy at the time. On 15 November 1889, the Emperor was deposed by a military coup and the Republic was proclaimed, further adding instability and strife to the already torn-up country.

All this was important to the make-up of Canudos. Antônio Conselheiro was strongly against slavery, and had preached and written about it, incurring the wrath of farmers and authorities. The number of his flocks increased dramatically, and it is estimated that over 80% were former slaves. In addition, he considered that monarchy was a grant of God, and that the Republic, with its separation between Church and State, was morally wrong and would wreck the country and family, a kind of new antichrist. Again he stepped up public criticism and rallied the social movement around these flags. General nervousness of farmers, priests and government increased to hysterical fear.

Finally, in 1893, violence erupted. Protesting against taxes levied by the new Republican government in Masseté, state of Bahia, "Conselhistas" (as Antônio Conselheiro's organized following was named) were attacked by a small police force and retaliated.

=== Canudos ===
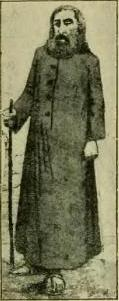
Antônio Conselheiro.

Antônio Conselheiro decided then to retreat and to establish in 1893 a permanent place for his growing band of now quasi-insurrectionaries. Near the city of Monte Santo, in the Northeast tip of Bahia, he founded the village of Belo Monte (Fair Hill), in an area named Canudos. It was set in an abandoned farm amid several mountain ranges, near the Vaza-Barris River.

In Canudos, Antônio Conselheiro, aided by a local government by committee, composed by 12 "apostles", or elders, established a communitarian society, with division of labour and produce, common property, abolition of civil marriage and of the official currency, prohibition of taverns, liquor and prostitution, rigid control over crimes and mandatory religious activities. He also gave a measure of personal freedom from injustice and oppression by landlords and governmental authorities. The fame of Canudos spread rapidly throughout the Northeast, as being a promised land of "milk and honey". Former black slaves, uprooted indigenous people and impoverished and landless caboclos started to come in droves to Canudos. By one year later, Canudos already had 8,000 new residents; by 1895 its population had grown to more than 30,000 and more than 5,000 dwellings. Two churches and one school were also built and commerce and agriculture became more organised.

The massive presence of such kinds of people started to cause much fear and trouble in the region, since many of the new residents were not-so-peaceful "jagunços" (hired armed men who worked for farmers), leading to appeals to the government for repression and control. Fearing an invasion of the city of Juazeiro by the "Conselhistas", who had a dispute with a lumber merchant, its mayor appealed hysterically to the provincial government. A visit by two Capuchin friars to Canudos was insufficient to calm the population and one of them mistakenly accused Antônio Conselheiro of trying to raise a monarchist sedition.

All was set for the start of military aggression against the largely peaceful settlement.

=== Death ===
During the heavy military siege that followed, Antônio Conselheiro spent his time praying and fasting troubled by the death, hunger and suffering of his followers. Due to this severe fasting, he died on 22 September 1897, at the age 67. The cause of death was probably dysentery. His death was the beginning of Canudos' defeat, which eventually brought about the brutal death of more than 50% of the city's inhabitants during the military operations and ensuing atrocities committed by the army against the civilian population.

His body was found and identified by military surgeons. His head was cut off and sent to Salvador as proof of his death and displayed as a trophy. It was examined by forensic expert, Dr. Raimundo Nina Rodrigues, and placed in permanent exhibition at the museum of the Escola Bahiana de Medicina (Medical School of Bahia), where it was destroyed in a fire in May 1905.

== Literature ==
Besides his written preachings, Antônio Conselheiro left only one religious treatise, written in May 1895 and titled Apontamentos dos Preceitos da Divina Lei de Nosso Senhor Jesus Cristo, para a Salvação dos Homens ("Annotations on the Precepts of Our Lord Jesus Christ's Divine Law for the Salvation of Men").

The story of Antônio Conselheiro and the War of Canudos has been dramatized in Euclides da Cunha's Rebellion in the Backlands (Os Sertões). He is also portrayed in The War of the End of the World, a novel in Spanish by the Peruvian writer Mario Vargas Llosa. The story of Antônio Maciel, and the founding of, and war on, Canudos is also told in the novel The First Garment, by Georgian writer Guram Dochanashvili. The Scottish author R. B. Cunninghame Graham wrote A Brazilian Mystic: Being the Life and Miracles of Antonio Conselheiro.

== Quotation ==
"...a thousand flocks shall run from the seacoast to the backlands; and then the backlands will turn into seacoast and the seacoast into backlands." ("...há de vir rebanhos mil correndo do centro da Praia para o sertão então o sertão virará Praia e a Praia virará sertão.")
