= Antônio Moreira César =

Brazilian military officer and governor (1850–1897)

Moreira César
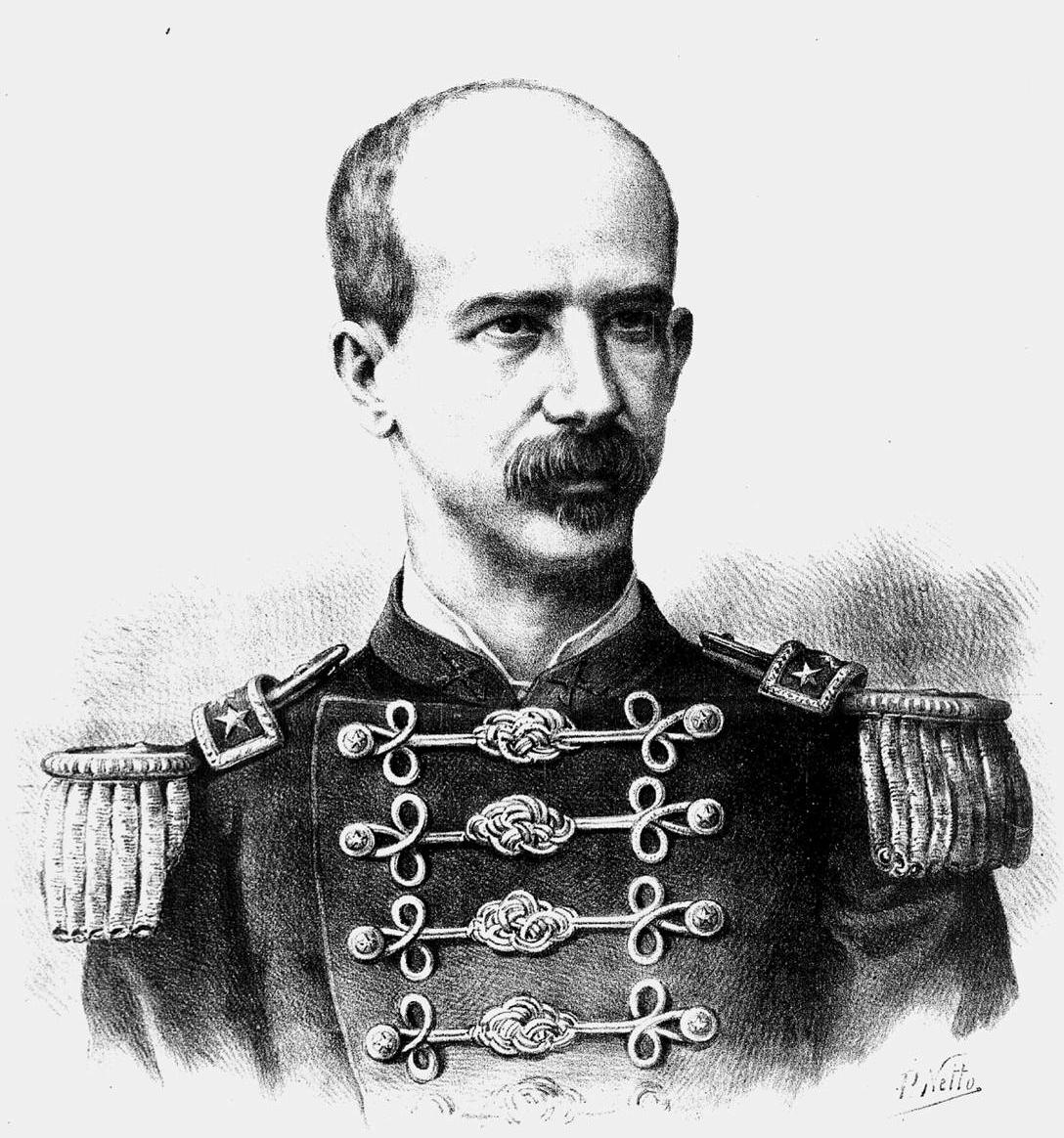
- Moreira César, lithography, c. 1897

Federal intervenor in Santa Catarina
- In office 22 April 1894 – 28 September 1894
- President: Floriano Peixoto
- Preceded by: Eliseu Guilherme (as governor)
- Succeeded by: Hercílio Luz (as governor)

Personal details
- Born: 9 July 1850 Pindamonhangaba, Empire of Brazil
- Died: 4 March 1897 (aged 46) Canudos, First Brazilian Republic

Military service
- Allegiance: Brazil
- Branch/service: Brazilian Army
- Rank: Colonel
- Battles/wars: Brazilian Naval Revolts; Federalist Revolution; War of Canudos †

Antônio Moreira César (9 July 1850 – 4 March 1897) was a Brazilian military officer and governor. He fought on the side of the government forces in the Naval Revolts, the Federalist Revolution and the War of Canudos, and served as the governor of Santa Catarina state in 1894, where he ordered numerous summary executions and extrajudicial killings, particularly the Baron of Batovi, a decorated war hero of the Paraguayan War.

Moreira César was killed in action fighting against the rebels of Antônio Conselheiro during the War of Canudos.

== Early life ==
César was born on 7 July 1850 in the state of São Paulo to Antônio Moreira César de Almeida (1814–1860) and his wife Francisca Correia de Toledo (1818–1895).

Beginning in his early 30s César suffered from epilepsy which may have affected his judgement.

== Military career ==
César joined the army at Rio de Janeiro before 1880 and served as an instructor, writing a training manual for Brazilian infantrymen. In 1880 he participated in the assassination of journalist Apulcro de Castro.

=== Revolta da Armada (1893–1894) ===
During the revolt he became a close adviser to president Floriano Peixoto.

=== War of Canudos (1896–1897) ===
After a defeat at the hands of the Canudos rebels, the Brazilian Army sent César to lead a large expeditionary force against them consisting of three infantry battalions, one cavalry and one artillery battalion, which were all newly armed and trained. Despite the new knowledge gained about the size and resolve of the rebels, it was thought impossible that they could resist such a strong regular army force.

During the expedition César's epilepsy presented itself and he suffered several lengthy seizures. He ordered an attack on a strong fort at Canudos, perceiving that the rebels were afraid of his men. César was mortally wounded on the first day of the attack, short while crossing the Vaza-Barris river. Command devolved to Colonel Tamarindo, who decided to order a withdrawal, against the protests of the dying César. César died on 4 March 1897, Tarmarindo was also killed during the retreat which caused panic and the dispersal of the army.

However, the Canudos rebels defeated César's column after only two days of fighting, resulting in another great loss of life and military material among the Brazilian forces, as well as the death of César himself.

Political offices
Preceded by Cristóvão Nunes Pires	Governor of Santa Catarina; 1894	Succeeded by Hercílio Luz
