= The First Garment =

1975 novel by Guram Dochanashvili

- Author: Guram Dochanashvili
- Original title: სამოსელი პირველი
- Language: Georgian
- Genre: Novel Adventure fiction Allegory
- Publication date: 1975
- Publication place: Georgia
- Media type: Print (hardback)
- Pages: 670 pages
- ISBN: 9789941103179

The First Garment (Georgian: სამოსელი პირველი, Samoseli Pirveli) is a novel by Georgian writer Guram Dochanashvili which serves as a retelling of The Parable of the Lost Son from the Bible. The plot follows a young, inexperienced, adventure-seeking man named Domenico who is deeply affected by the appearance and stories of a mysterious refugee in his village, and thus decides to take his inheritance and leave the village to go on adventuring.

== Synopsis ==
This novel is based on the motif of the Gospel parable of the Prodigal Son. Its main hero is Domenico, the younger son of the most powerful villager. He is greatly influenced by the story told by the fugitive, a person gripped by a mysterious fear. Domenic demands of his father his share of the inheritance and leaves to get to know the world. Over the years, Domenico meets many different people and gets caught up in the War of Canudos.

== Themes ==
The novel explores traditional motifs of morality, love, and the conflict between good and evil through a narrative framework that combines humor with aesthetic elements. Characterized by a dynamic and fluid narrative pace, the text incorporates extensive linguistic experimentation, a stylistic trait frequently identified with the author's broader body of work
