= Guram Dochanashvili =

Georgian writer and historian (1939–2021)

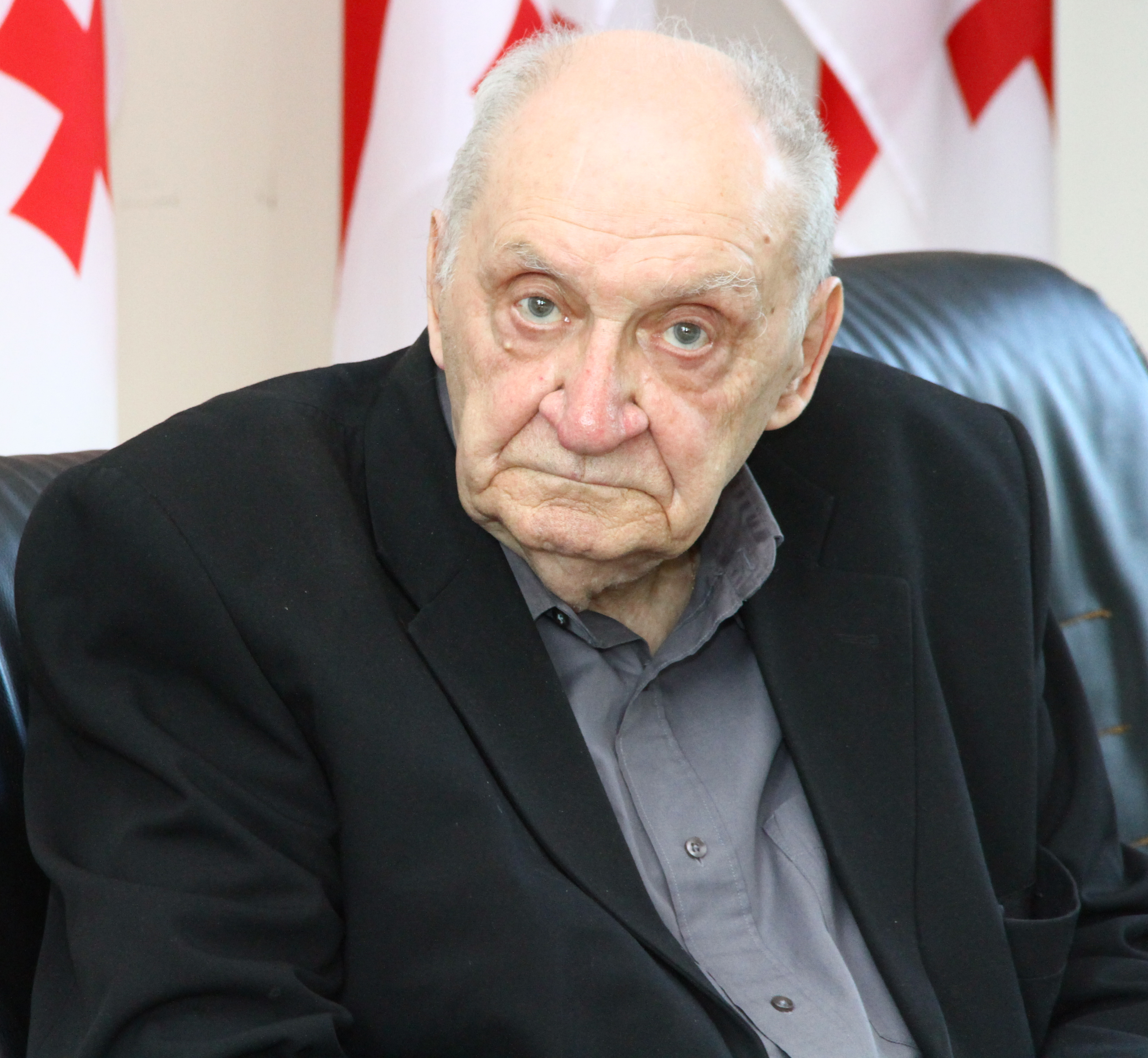
- Born: 26 March 1939; Tbilisi, Georgian SSR, Soviet Union
- Died: 3 April 2021 (aged 82); Tbilisi, Georgia
- Occupations: novelist, short story writer, archeologist
- Spouse: Natela Sepiashvili
- Writing career
- Language: Georgian language
- Notable work: First Garment (1975) Water(po)loo (1980)
- Literary movement: Postmodernism, satire, realism

Guram Dochanashvili (Georgian: გურამ დოჩანაშვილი; 26 March 1939 – 3 April 2021) was a Georgian prose writer and historian by profession, who was popular for his short stories since the 1960s.

== Biography ==
Dochanashvili was born in Tbilisi, the capital of then-Soviet Georgia. Having graduated from the Tbilisi State University in 1962, he worked for the Institute of History, Archaeology and Ethnography, and participated in several archaeological expeditions from 1962 to 1975. He then managed the prose section of the literary magazine Mnatobi from 1975 to 1985. Since 1985, he has been a director-in-chief of the Gruziya-film studio.

Dochanashvili debuted as a writer in 1961. He was immediately noted for his rejection of the Soviet literary dogmas of Socialist Realism, and his dissident views. Since then, he has published dozens of stories and novellas which won him a nationwide acclaim for their fairy-tale lightness and invention. His most popular work is the 1975 novel The First Garment (სამოსელი პირველი) based on the Holy Bible and story of the War of Canudos in 19th-century Brazil.

Dochanashvili was admitted to hospital on 1 April 2021. His condition was critical and he died two days later.

== Bibliography ==
- Across the Mountain. Short stories (1966)
- The Step. Short stories (1969)
- Glad Hill. Short stories (1971)
- The First Garment. A novel. Book 1 (1975)
- First Garment. A novel. Book 2 (1978)
- First Garment. A novel. Book 3 (1980)
- First Garment. A novel. Book 4 (1990)
- Affair. Short stories (1974)
- Short Stories (1976)
- The Best Grand-Father. A Fairy Tale for School Children (1976)
- First Garment. A novel (1982)
- Two Short Stories (1984)
- Platform. Short stories (1988)
- Four Short Stories (1991)
- Short Stories. Second Edition (1987)
- A Man Who Loved Literature (2001)
- Five Short Stories (2002)
- Brother's. A short story (2002)
- Waterloo or Reconstruction Works. A short story (2002)
- Only One Man. Short stories (2002)
- The First Garment. A novel (2002)
- He was Seeking: Some Kind of Short Story, Partially Detective (2002)
- Difficult. Short stories (2002)
- Khorumi is a Georgian Dance. Play (2003)
- Boulder on Which Once there was a Church, a novel (2002)
- Western Omara and Givia and Planet Hollywood. A novel (2005)
- Until the Time. Short stories (1991)
- The Kezheradzes. Four short stories (2005)
- Collected Stories. In Four Volumes (2003)
- Song without Words (1983)
- What I Remember and Recollect More Often (2010)

== Awards ==
- Literary Award Saba for The Contribution in the Development of Literature (2010)
- Saint George's Order for Establishing Moral Values, Patriarchate of Georgia (2013)
