= Itapicuru =

Municipality of Bahia, Brazil

Coordinates: 11°19′01″S 38°13′58″W

- Municipality
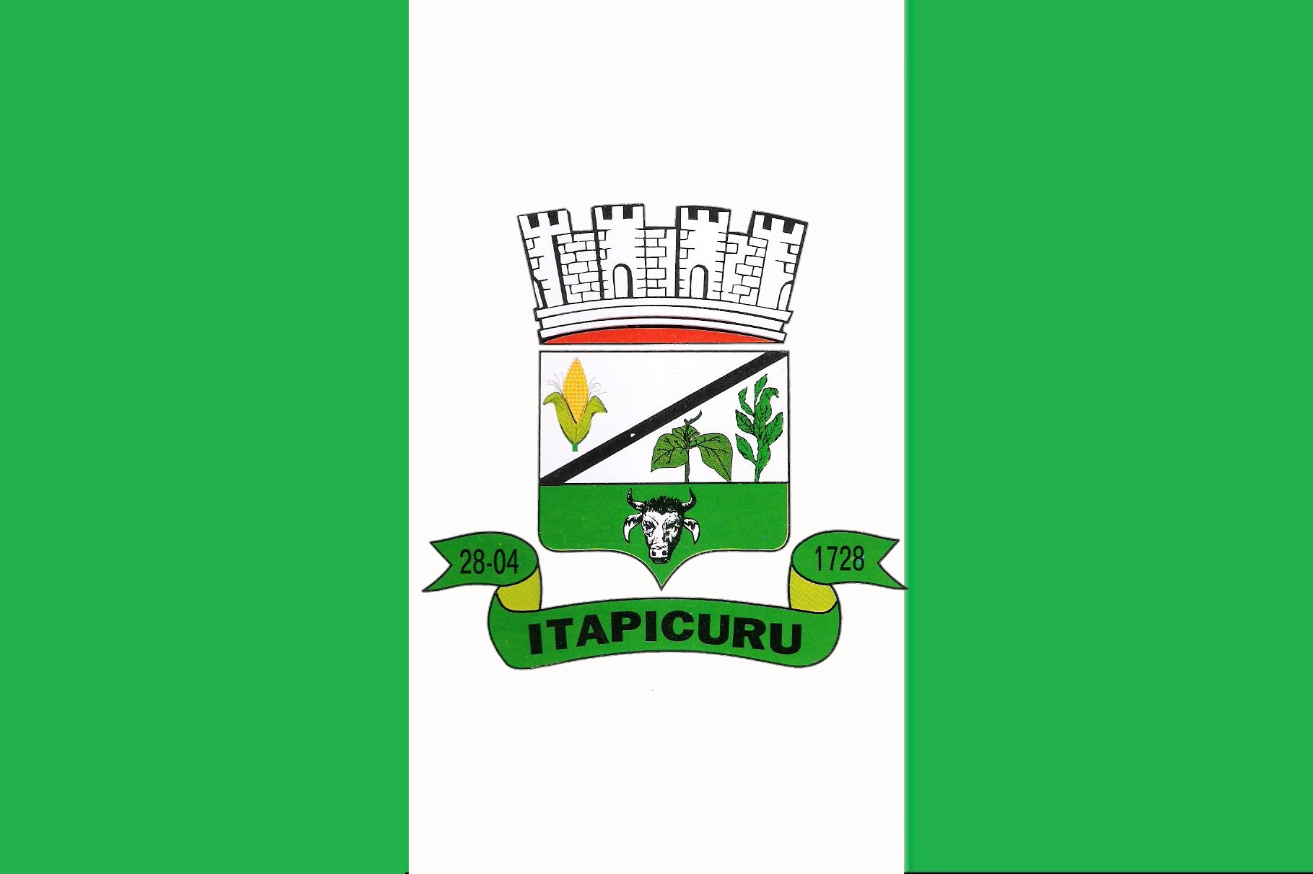
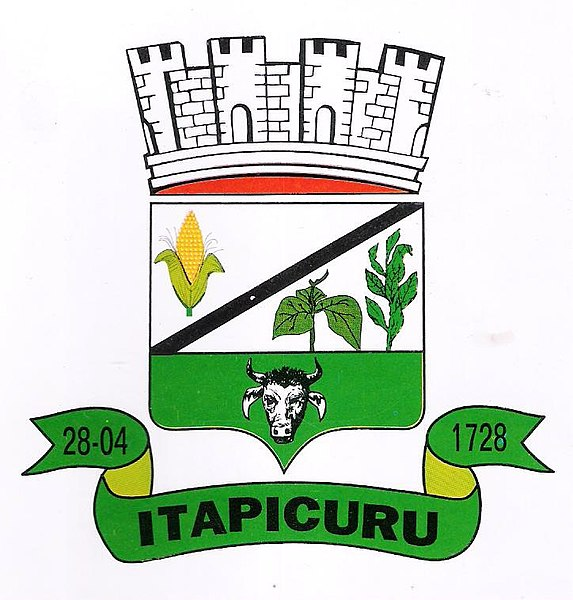
- Flag Coat of arms
- Interactive map of Itapicuru
- Country: Brazil
- Region: Nordeste
- State: Bahia

Population (2010)
  - Total: 32,261
- Time zone: UTC−3 (BRT)

Itapicuru is a municipality in the state of Bahia in the North-East region of Brazil.

== See also ==
- List of municipalities in Bahia
