= Fundação de Amparo à Pesquisa do Estado da Bahia =

The Fundação de Amparo à Pesquisa do Estado da Bahia (FAPESB) is an organization of the Bahia, Brazil, government devoted to funding of science and technology in the state.
