= Canudos =

Municipality in Bahia, Brazil

Coordinates: 9.964°S 39.164°W

- Municipality
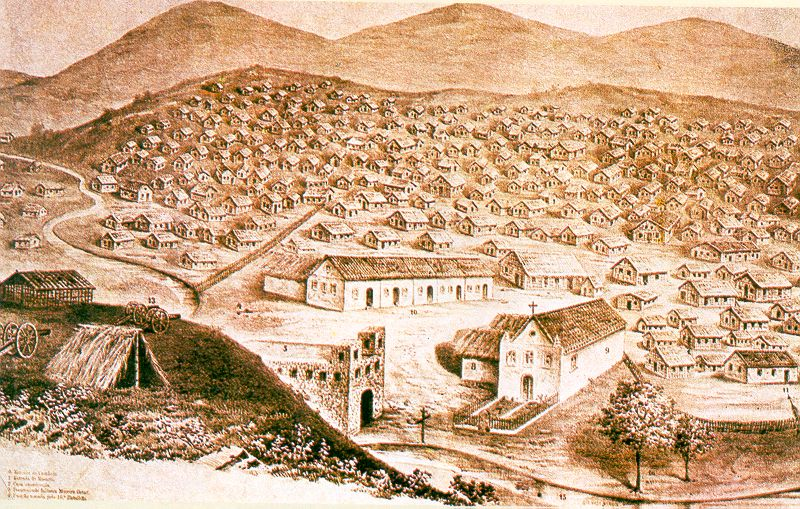
- Canudos, circa 1895

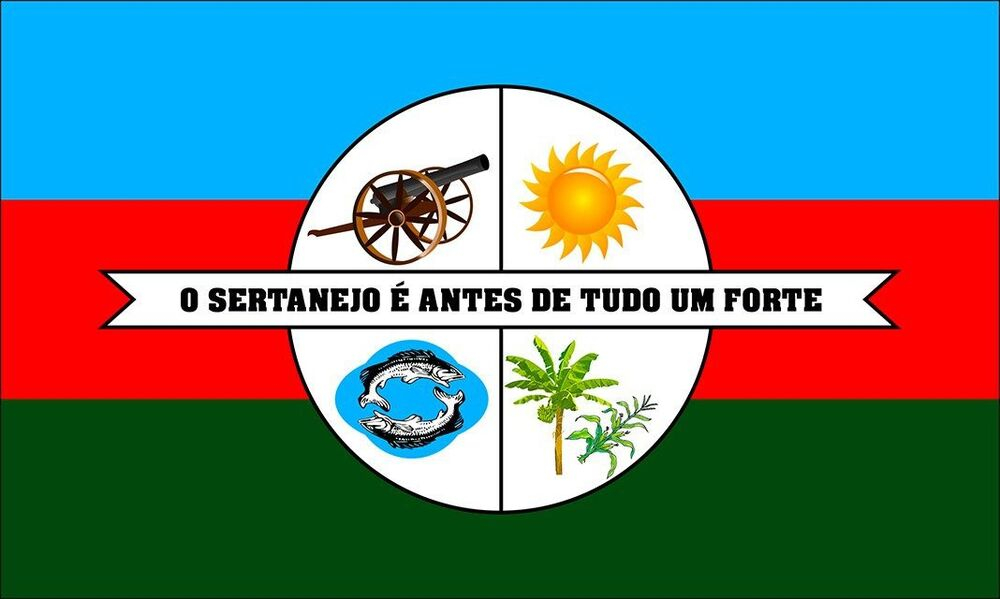
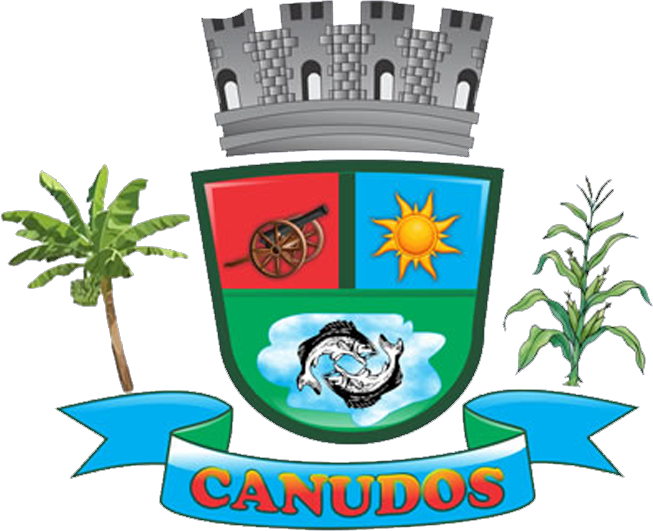
- Flag Coat of arms

- Location in Bahia
- Country: Brazil
- Region: Nordeste
- State: Bahia

Population (2020)
  - Total: 16,753
- Time zone: UTC−3 (BRT)

Canudos is a municipality in the northeast region of Bahia, Brazil. The original town, since flooded by the Cocorobó Dam, was the scene of violent clashes between peasants and republican police in the 1890s.

The municipality contains part of the Raso da Catarina ecoregion.

== History ==
The town of Canudos was founded in the racially diverse Bahia state of northeastern Brazil in 1893 by Antônio Vicente Mendes Maciel, an itinerant preacher from Ceara. Mendes Maciel had been wandering through the backroads and lesser-inhabited areas of the country from the 1870s onwards, followed by a band of loyal supporters. As his following swelled, he took on the name Antônio Conselheiro (Antônio the Counselor) and increasingly began to trouble the local authorities, who saw him as a Monarchist and thus a threat to their legitimacy.

=== Settlement ===
In 1893, following a protest over taxation and a violent melee with the police forces in Masseté, Conselheiro and his band settled on an abandoned farm called Canudos, so called because a plant, canudo-de-pita (scientific name Ipomoea carnea, its popular name referring to its hollow tubes, used for manufacturing smoking pipes) was common in the region. The place was named Belo Monte (Beautiful Mount) by Antonio Conselheiro, but the old name, Arraial de Canudos, prevailed. Over the years people from across Bahia, including landless farmers, former slaves, indigenous people and cangaceiros flocked to join him, and within a few years the fledgling settlement numbered 30,000 people (which made it the second largest urban center in Bahia behind Salvador) and had developed a leather exporting business.

As a community, Canudos operated somewhat like a religious commune, with Antônio Conselheiro as the principal member and director. Canudos was a heavily religious settlement, under the sway of Antonio's fanaticism, but despite his fanaticism he did not assume any official position of authority. The settlement practiced common ownership, abolished the official currency, negated Brazilian national laws and participated collectively in the management of the town. Canudos was in essence a reaction against the contemporary Brazilian nation.

Neither the local nor national government supported the settlement in Canudos. The local government of Bahia felt pressure from landowners to take action against the settlement because of labor shortages caused by migration. The Brazilian national government wanted a military expedition sent to destroy Canudos in the name of liberalism and progress. In the words of one historian, "The mere existence of autonomous movements not subject to state control was antithetical to the national interest. Canudos stood for such autonomy, and therefore had to be destroyed."

=== Suppression of the community ===
The first three invasions were amply defeated by the villagers. However, in 1897, a considerably larger fourth invasion force managed to overwhelm the village. Their success was in part helped by the death, from dysentery, of Antônio Conselheiro, during the early stages of the siege. The Brazilian army showed no mercy, brutally massacring the survivors and destroying the entire village. An academic, Alvim Horcades, would thus describe the massacre:

"Eu vi e assisti a sacrificar-se todos aqueles miseráveis (...) e com sinceridade o digo: em Canudos foram degolados quase todos os prisioneiros (...) Arrancar-se a vida a uma criancinha (...) é o maior dos barbarismos e dos crimes que o homem pode praticar." ("I saw and witnessed the sacrifice of all those poor people (...) and I say with all sincerity: in Canudos almost all the prisoners were beheaded (...) To take the life of a little child (...) is the greatest of cruelties and crimes man can commit.")

== Post-War Canudos ==
Today the area is submerged by water, the result of the Cocorobó Dam project in the 1970s, which blocked the Vaza-Barris River and flooded the old city. At low water the ruins of the church that was once the village's centrepiece can occasionally be seen. Once a year, in October, a mass is held to commemorate those lost in what is known today as the War of Canudos. The municipality of Nova Canudos was built nearby, at latitude 09°53'48" South and longitude 39°01'35" West, and currently has around 13,000 inhabitants.

The story of Canudos was told by war correspondent Euclides da Cunha in the book Os Sertões (1901; translated into English as Rebellion in the Backlands, 1944), which helped inspire and provide material for the novel The War of the End of the World by Peruvian Nobel Laureate Mario Vargas Llosa (1981). The conflict was also described at length by Peter Robb in "A Death in Brazil" (2004). In fictional form it appears in the novel "The First Garment" (1975) by a Georgian writer Guram Dochanashvili.

The municipality contains the 1,321 hectares (3,260 acres) Canudos State Park, created in 1986 to commemorate the War of Canudos.

== See also ==
- Antonio Conselheiro
- War of Canudos
- History of Brazil (1889–1930)
