= War of Canudos =

1896–1897 internal conflict in Brazil

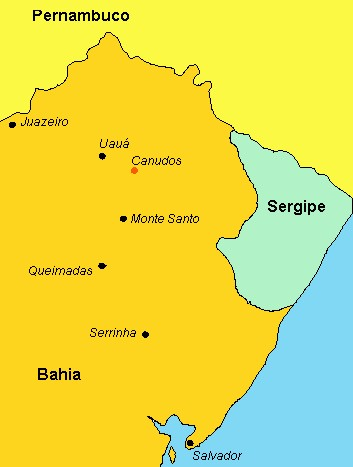
- Map of northern Bahia, showing the location of Canudos
Date	1896 – 2 October 1897
Location	Bahia, Brazil
Result	Movement squashed; settlement destroyed and survivors massacred

Belligerents
Brazil: Brazilian Army; Police Corps	Canudos inhabitants: Jagunços; Civil militia

Commanders and leaders
Arthur Oscar; Moreira César (DOW); Febrônio de Brito; Virgílio Pereira; Pires Ferreira	Antônio Conselheiro #; João Abade †

Strength
12,000 soldiers (Army and Police)	25,000

Casualties and losses
Less than 5,000 dead	Almost 25,000 dead; only some 150 survivors

The War of Canudos (Portuguese: Guerra de Canudos, pronounced [ˈɡɛʁɐ dʒi kɐˈnudus]) was a conflict between the First Brazilian Republic and the residents of Canudos in the northeastern state of Bahia, between 1896 and 1897. It was waged in the aftermath of the abolition of slavery in Brazil and the overthrow of the monarchy. The conflict arose from a millenarian cult led by Antônio Conselheiro, who began attracting attention around 1874 by preaching spiritual salvation to the poor population of the sertão, a region which suffered from severe droughts. Conselheiro and his followers came into conflict with the local authorities after founding the village of Canudos. The situation soon escalated, with Bahia's government requesting assistance from the federal government, who sent military expeditions against the settlement.

Antônio Conselheiro and his followers were branded as "monarchists" by the press, with the authorities seeing the settlement as a threat to the recently proclaimed Brazilian Republic, which was still in process of consolidating itself. Rumors spread that the inhabitants of Canudos were planning to "depose the new Republican government" and "restore the monarchy." The inhabitants of Canudos were "so numerous, employed such artful strategies and so committed" that it took four military campaigns to defeat them. Despite the government's troops employing modern weapons against the poorly armed and organized Conselheiristas, the first three expeditions resulted in failure, including the death of Colonel Moreira César, which harmed the government's image and alarmed public opinion.

The conflict came to a brutal end in October 1897, when the fourth and final expedition, led by General Arthur Oscar, with a large fraction of the Brazilian Army, was deployed to bombard and overrun the settlement, raze it and slaughter nearly all its inhabitants.

== Background ==
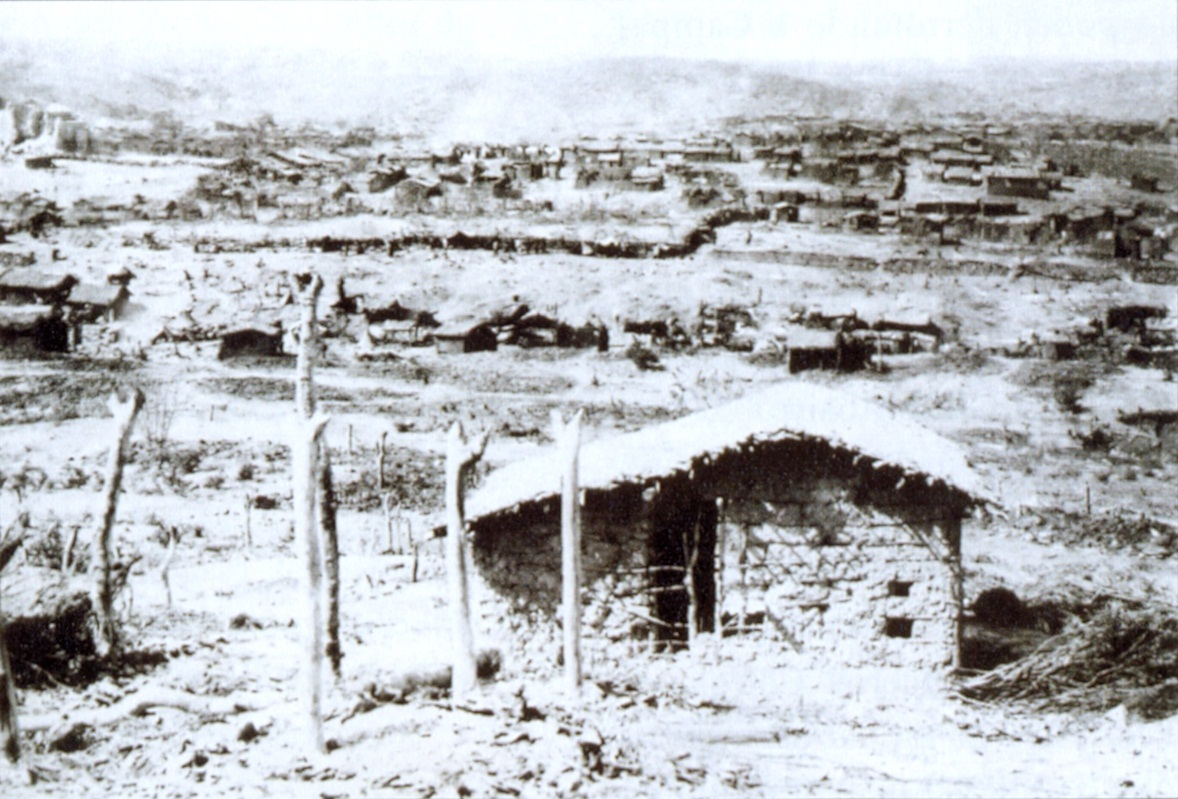
A view of the village of Canudos. Typical constructions such as the one in the foreground were very basic, made of mud and straw

The conflict had its origins in the former settlement of Canudos (named Belo Monte by its inhabitants, meaning "Beautiful Hill" in Portuguese) in the semi-arid backcountry (or sertão) of Bahia. In the late 19th century, the region suffered from poverty, with an economy based on subsistence agriculture and cattle raising, severely lacking infrastructure. The disenfranchised population drew equally from rural and urban portions of the region and represented a "broad spectrum of ethnic and economic origins". It was fertile ground for the growth of dissatisfaction with the new Republic, proclaimed on 15 November 1889, after a military coup against the ruling emperor, Pedro II. While the republic was strongly supported by much of the urban population, the old emperor was still loved by the common people. For the sertanejos, "the only change" that came with the establishment of the republic was "an increase in taxes."

This period was characterized by considerable political, social and economic instability, as the military fought to put down revolts all over the country. It was, therefore "immensely unpopular" and dangerous to be known as anything other than republican during this time. At the onset of this early republican era, a man by the name of Antônio Vicente Mendes Maciel, known as Antônio Conselheiro (Antônio, the Counselor) began rising to prominence in Bahia's hinterlands. He was one of the many itinerant religious figures in the backcountry of Brazil. Conselheiro traveled from village to village with his followers, assisting the local communities and garnering support from small farmers, "collecting money and organizing labor for the construction of churches, dams and cemeteries". As an increasing number of supporters joined his cause, Conselheiro drew the attention and hostility of the local landowners, who disapproved of his ideals.

Conselheiro claimed to be a prophet and predicted the return of the legendary Portuguese king Sebastian (see Sebastianism). He held that "it was the monarch’s God-given right to rule", which caused him to be progressively branded as a monarchist figure by the unstable Republic at the time. The ultra-conservative doctrine he preached, implicitly criticizing the "wayward behavior" of many priests, was "attractive" to many sertanejos, and led the Church hierarchy to view him as a "threat to the Church's authority and popularity".

After wandering through the states of Ceará, Pernambuco, Sergipe and Bahia, he eventually decided to settle permanently in 1893 with his followers in the backlands of Bahia, in the farming community of Canudos, near Monte Santo, Bahia on the banks of the Vaza-Barris River. The village was very small but offered the Conselheiristas protection, as the location was hard to access. Within two years, as the religious community prospered, Conselheiro convinced several thousand followers to join him, eventually making it the second-largest urban center in Bahia at the time. The settlement was supported by cultivation of crops and export of leather, with residents allowed to retain private property and businesses. "The poor were maintained through donations to the community".

=== Basis of history ===
Determining what exactly happened in the war is problematic, as the two main historical source groups consist of military chronicles (written to justify the army's actions) and far-from-impartial journalistic reports. According to Peter Robb, "[t]he foreign correspondents who covered what was soon being called the War of Canudos, as if it were a conflict between nations rather than the extermination of a tiny community within a single country, were nearly all embedded with the army of the Brazilian republic."

== Military campaigns ==
=== Initial military campaign ===
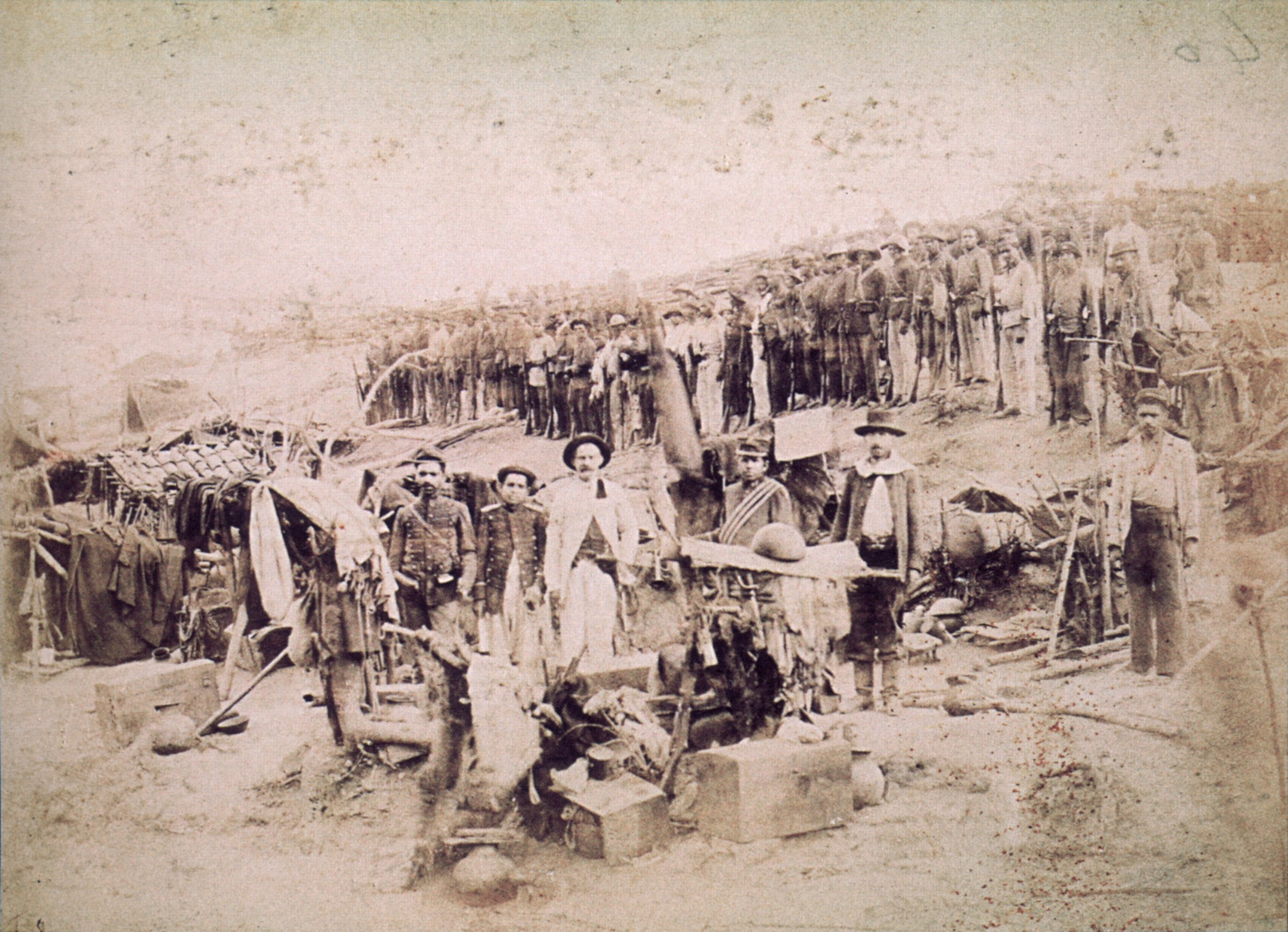
The 40th Infantry Battalion, sent from the Pará state to quell the Canudos rebellion, 1897

The incident that served as the catalyst for Canudos’ eventual destruction was a dispute over delivery of lumber. Conselheiro had placed an order of wood from a business in the neighboring town of Juazeiro he often did business with to construct a new church. However, a new local judge, Arlindo Leoni, opposed Conselheiro and prevented the delivery. Some Canudenses then took it upon themselves to go to Juazeiro to claim the wood. Hearing of this plan, the judge responded by requesting police forces from the state governor, Luis Viana, claiming an imminent "invasion" of his town by Conselheiro and his followers. Viana recounts that he had been informed by Leoni of "rumors which were current, and which were more or less well-founded, to the effect that the flourishing city in question [Juazeiro] was to be assaulted within a few days by Antônio Conselheiro’s followers."

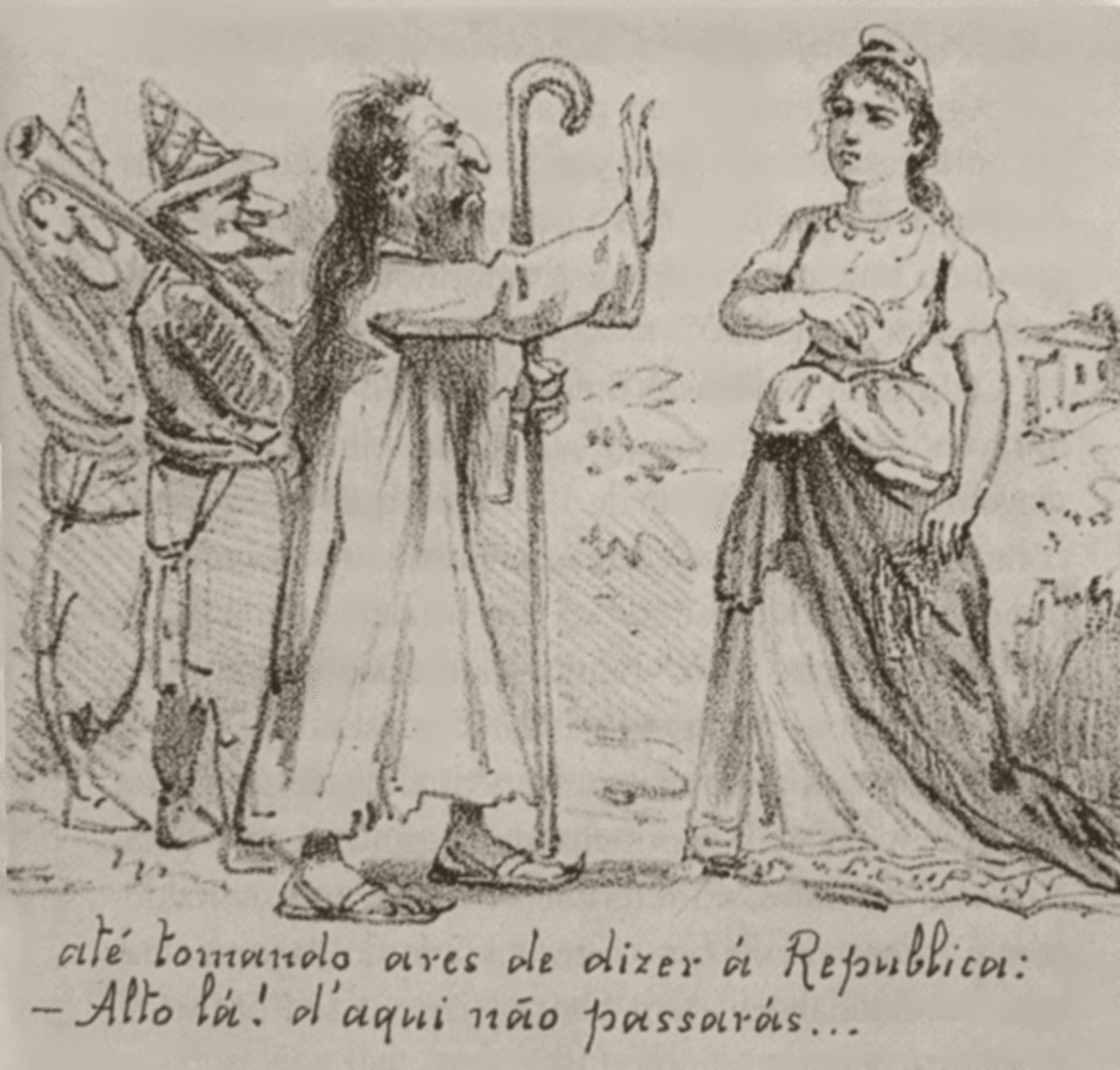
Caricature showing Antônio Conselheiro with an entourage of jesters armed with ancient blunderbusses, trying to stop the Republic, Revista Illustrada, c. 1896. The caption reads: "[He is] even daring to tell the Republic: 'hold on! You shall not pass...'"

While the troops were initially dispatched for the sole purpose of preventing the assault, Leoni managed to convince their commander Pires Ferreira to march on Canudos. With scant information about terrain and the defensive resources of Canudos' population, a small, 100-man force commanded by Ferreira was sent towards the settlement on 4 November 1896. However, the Canudenses marching from the religious settlement to Juazeiro surprised the troops at Uauá and a fierce battle ensued. Estimates of the number of Conselheiristas that engaged in the battle varied anywhere from 1,000 to 3,000 men, and accounts reported that they were armed with "old muskets, pikes, scythes, long poles, and implements of the land." Despite some considerable losses, estimated at 150 men, the Canudenses drove the state police soldiers off. The troops then retreated to Juazeiro and awaited reinforcements from the state of Bahia.

The government and the local media quickly publicized the soldiers’ defeat in the backlands of Bahia. The media (i.e. newspapers) played an essential role in escalating the conflict, spreading rumors that rather than being a local and unsophisticated uprising, the Conselheiristas were allied with other monarchists scheming to launch a "restoration" of the monarchy. The unstable political climate along with the scarcity of military resources in Bahia led the state government to seek aid from the federal government to crush the increasingly threatening settlement. Since the First Brazilian Republic had only recently been founded, it saw the rebel settlers as a monarchist and separatist threat to its authority to be made an example of.

The President of Brazil at the time, Prudente de Morais, ordered another punitive military expedition to Canudos. A second 104-man force, again commanded by Ferreira, began its preparations in November 1896, and attacked the settlement on 21 November 1896. The settlement was fiercely defended by a band of 500 armed men, shouting praises to Antônio Conselheiro and the monarchy, and the attacking force faced problems similar to the first expedition. The Brazilian soldiers retreated after incurring severe losses and killing around 150 of the settlers, who were armed only with machetes, primitive lances and axes.

=== Second military campaign ===
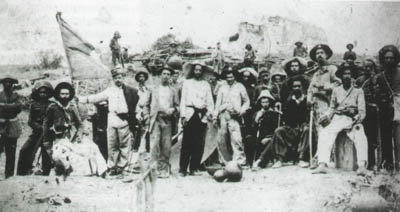
The 24th Infantry Battalion in Canudos, 1897

The defeat of the Pires Ferreira campaign produced sensationalist media reports about the ferocity and fanaticism of Canudos' inhabitants, which provoked an outcry and calls for reprisals against the settlement. Rather than causing its inhabitants to flee, the armed conflict caused the settlement to grow exponentially, and it now numbered over 30,000 residents.

On 12 January 1897, Republican troops, which comprised 547 men, 14 officers, and 3 surgeons, left Juazeiro for Canudos. The attack on the Conselheiristas began on 18 January, and led to the death of 115 Canudenses with minimal losses on the army's side, which had some initial success with artillery against the villagers' trenches. However, the soldiers were eventually surrounded by more than 4,000 insurrectionists. Running short of ammunition, food and water, and with the rebels continuing to fight despite heavy losses, the Republican soldiers retreated to nearby Monte Santo to await reinforcements.

Canudenses celebrated their victory against the expedition in a particularly destructive way; burning ranches and farm buildings, creating a ring of scorched earth within a radius of seven miles of Canudos. With the Canudenses winning crushing victories and journalists responding with cries of alarm, the national military and civilian authorities labeled Canudos a dangerous threat to national order and to the prestige of the armed forces and the new government.

=== Third military campaign ===
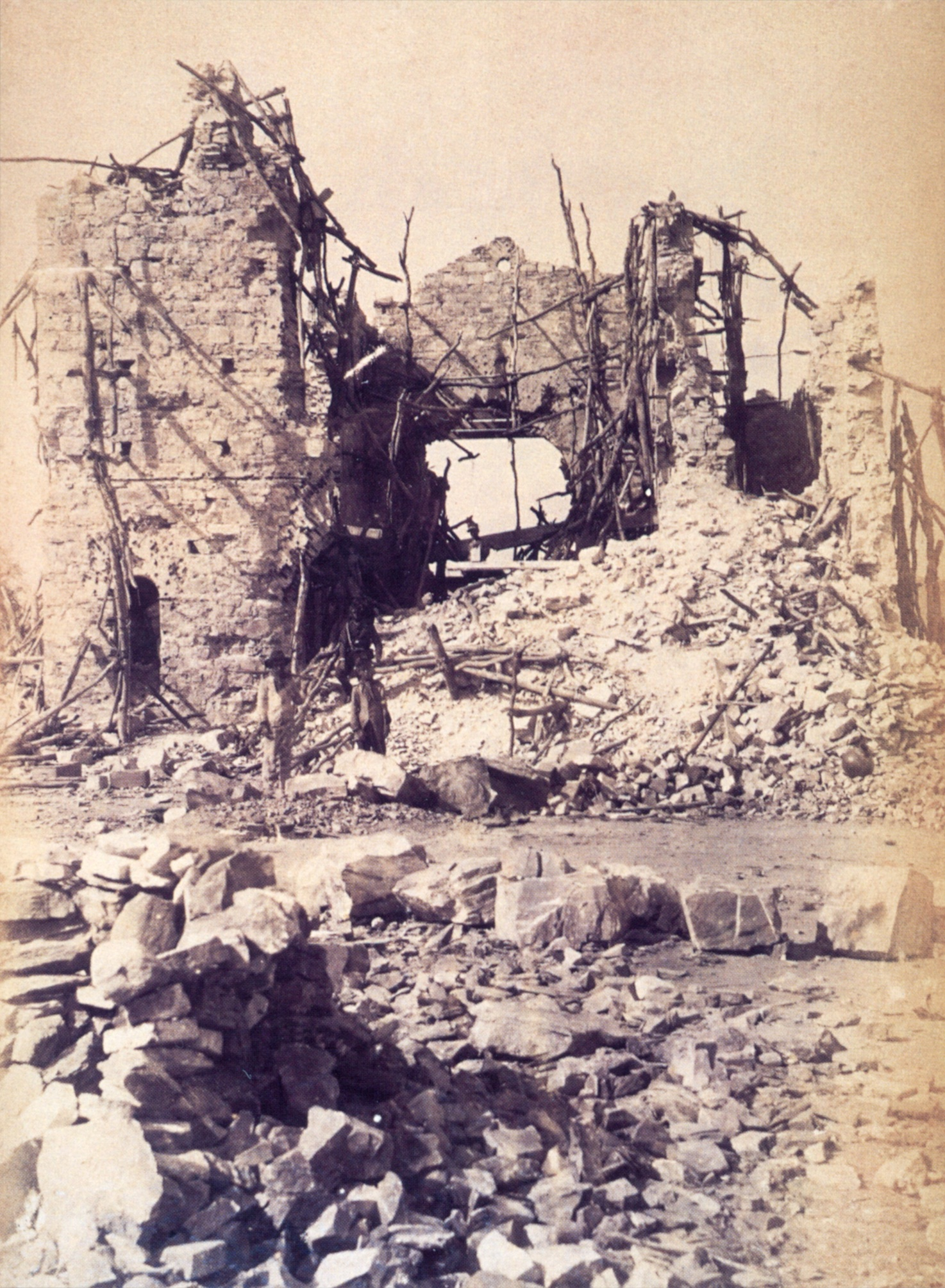
Ruins of the Bom Jesus church after the destruction of Canudos, 1897

An experienced colonel, Antônio Moreira César, set out with 1,300 troops; three infantry, one cavalry and one artillery battalions, all newly armed and trained, and reportedly carrying "seventy rounds of cannon-balls and sixteen million rounds of ammunition."

On 20 February, Moreira and his soldiers arrived at Monte Santo. Antônio Moreira César had recently crushed another insurrection in southern Brazil where he earned the nickname "cutthroat".

Although forewarned about the numbers and resolve of the rebels, the military thought it impossible that the rebels could resist such a strong regular army force. A day after arriving in Monte Santo, completely disregarding "the intense heat and parched land," the force advanced on Canudos. Their equipment quickly turned out be inadequate for the sertão of Bahia. Wagon trains that carried supplies "sank up to their hubs in sand." This was also disregarded and the troops continued their forced march to Canudos.

Attacking the settlement, the troops found that the artillery barrages had turned the settlement of huts into a "maze" that was impossible for the advancing soldiers to navigate. On 6 March 1897, after only two days of fighting, the surviving officers had no choice but to vote to retreat. Moreira César's protests were overlooked, and he died before dawn due to a fatal wound. Moreira César's shocking failure may have been brought on by epileptic seizures. Starting to retreat, the soldiers panicked and a disastrous rout ensued; many were killed by pursuing Canudenses. Many soldiers abandoned their weapons and ammunition, which were recovered by the rebels. The artillery maintained good order but was attacked and slaughtered by the rebels who took possession of its weapons and ammunition.

In Rio de Janeiro and São Paulo, the country's largest cities, where monarchism was very unpopular, demonstrations in the streets turned into riots and four monarchist newspaper offices were destroyed, and the owner of one lynched.

=== Fourth expedition and final destruction of Canudos ===
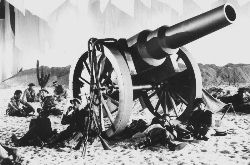
A matadeira (The Killer), a British-manufactured cannon used in the War of Canudos by the Brazilian Army against the rebels. Photograph from a replica, taken from the movie A Matadeira by Jorge Furtado, 1994

Pressured, the federal government sent a new expedition under general Arthur Oscar de Andrade Guimarães, assisted by four other generals, and with the direct involvement of Carlos Machado de Bittencourt, the Minister of War, who went with his entire staff to Monte Santo, the nearby city which had served as the gathering point for the army and where the large military force was being assembled. Machine guns and large artillery pieces, such as mortars and howitzers, including a powerful Whitworth 32, nicknamed Matadeira (Killer), went with the 3,000-man force, and had to be hauled with enormous effort through the unforgiving roadless landscape.

The troops set off on 16 June. This time, the attackers were aided by the rampant hunger and malnutrition (and most of all thirst) among the inhabitants of Canudos, and the heavy losses they had suffered in the previous attacks. On the other hand, the attackers were hindered by the fact that the rebels now possessed "some of the most advanced weapons of the time" (repeating rifles "like the Austrian Mannlicher and the Belgian Comblains"), abandoned by fleeing republican troops.

Accounts of the expedition differ. Robert Levine wrote that hundreds of men in the first battalion of 2,350 were trapped by the Canudenses and slaughtered. Fearing another failed expedition, the troops retreated to the town of Monte Santo. Walnice Nogueira Galvão and Levine agree there was a siege and starvation.

A month later a second campaign began with over 8,000 soldiers who encircled and laid siege to Canudos. This starved the population into submission.

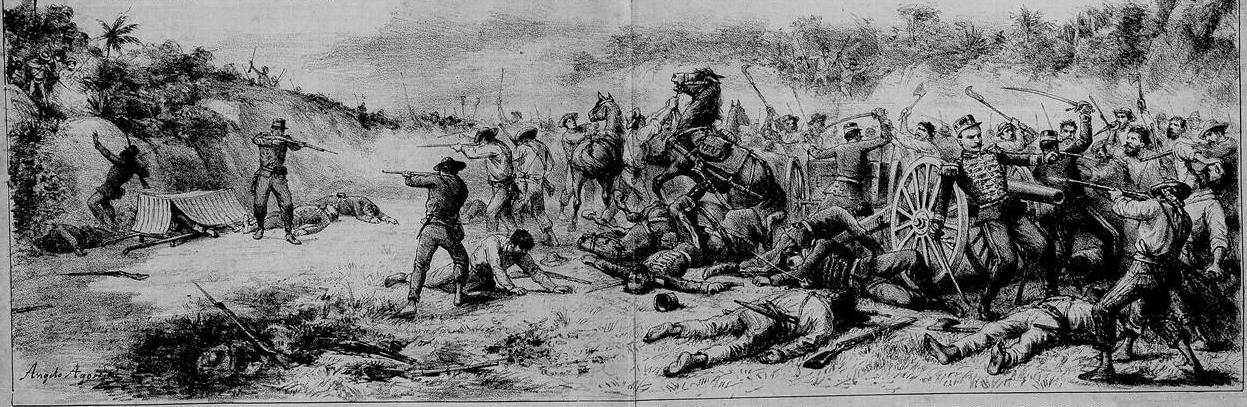
"Battle in Canudos between the government troops and the fanatics of Antônio Conselheiro", Don Quixote, No. 82, 1897

A few days before the end, a surrender was negotiated. However, to the chagrin of the army, the only insurrectionists who actually surrendered were about three hundred women, who had been reduced to walking skeletons by extreme hunger, accompanied by their children and a few old men.

The fighting started again. Reports of the fighting stated that hundreds of Canudos defenders and hundreds of federal soldiers died every day. The last assault persisted until the beginning of October, when the military forces set off 90 dynamite bombs in the settlement, thus marking the defeat of the settlement of Canudos. Galvão wrote that the fighting ended on 5 October 1897, when there was no surrender, but no more fire from the rebels.

Levine wrote that throughout this expedition, an undetermined number of Canudenses fled the settlement. Others accepted an offer of surrender with the promise of their lives being spared. This offer, however, was not honored. One of the forces' generals had the men "surrounded by soldiers, and hacked to death in front of hundreds of witness, including many of their wives and children." Immediately after the final assault, soldiers "smashed, leveled, and burned all 5,200 in the settlement."

== Aftermath ==
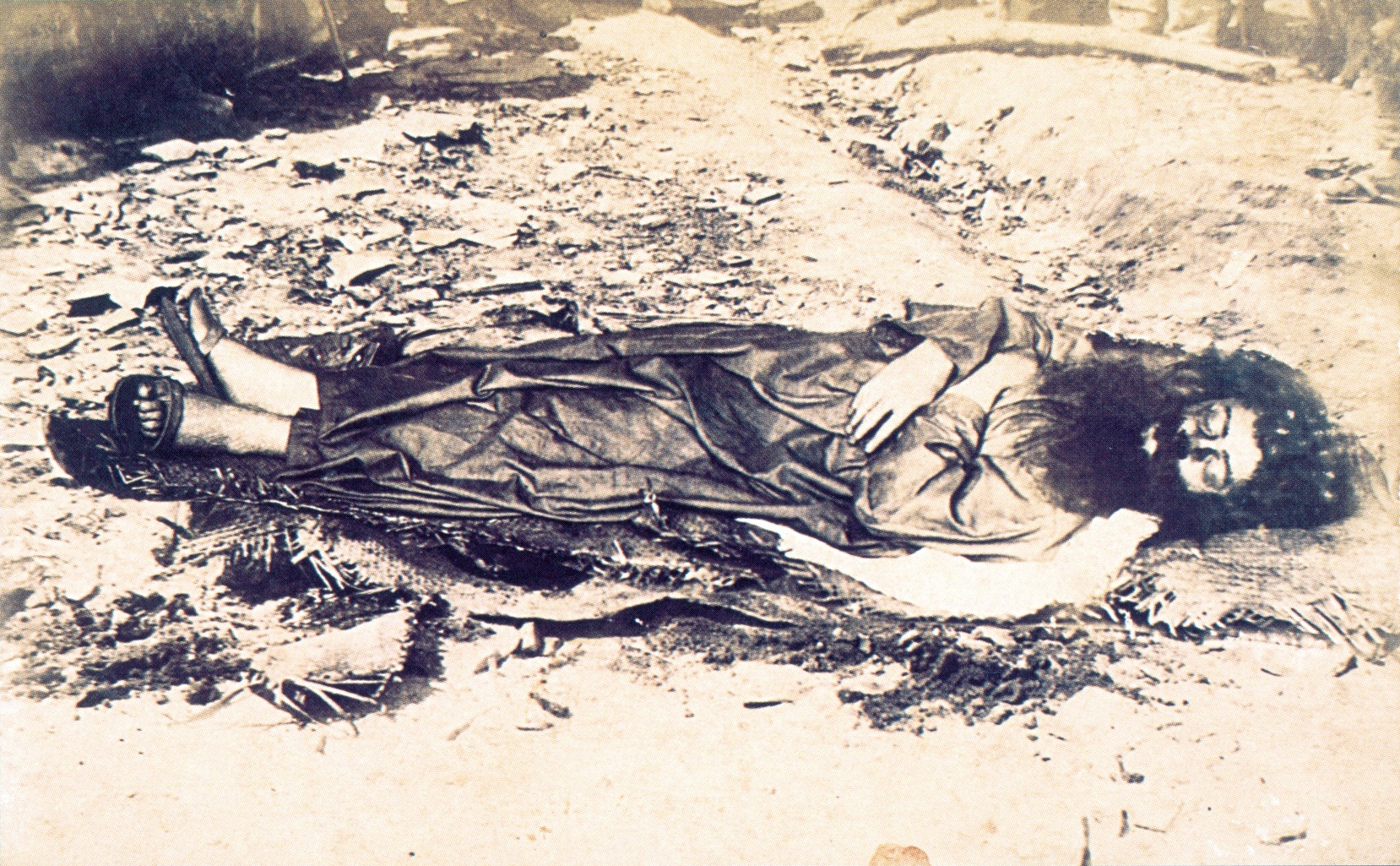
The only photograph of Antônio Conselheiro, taken after his death in September 1897

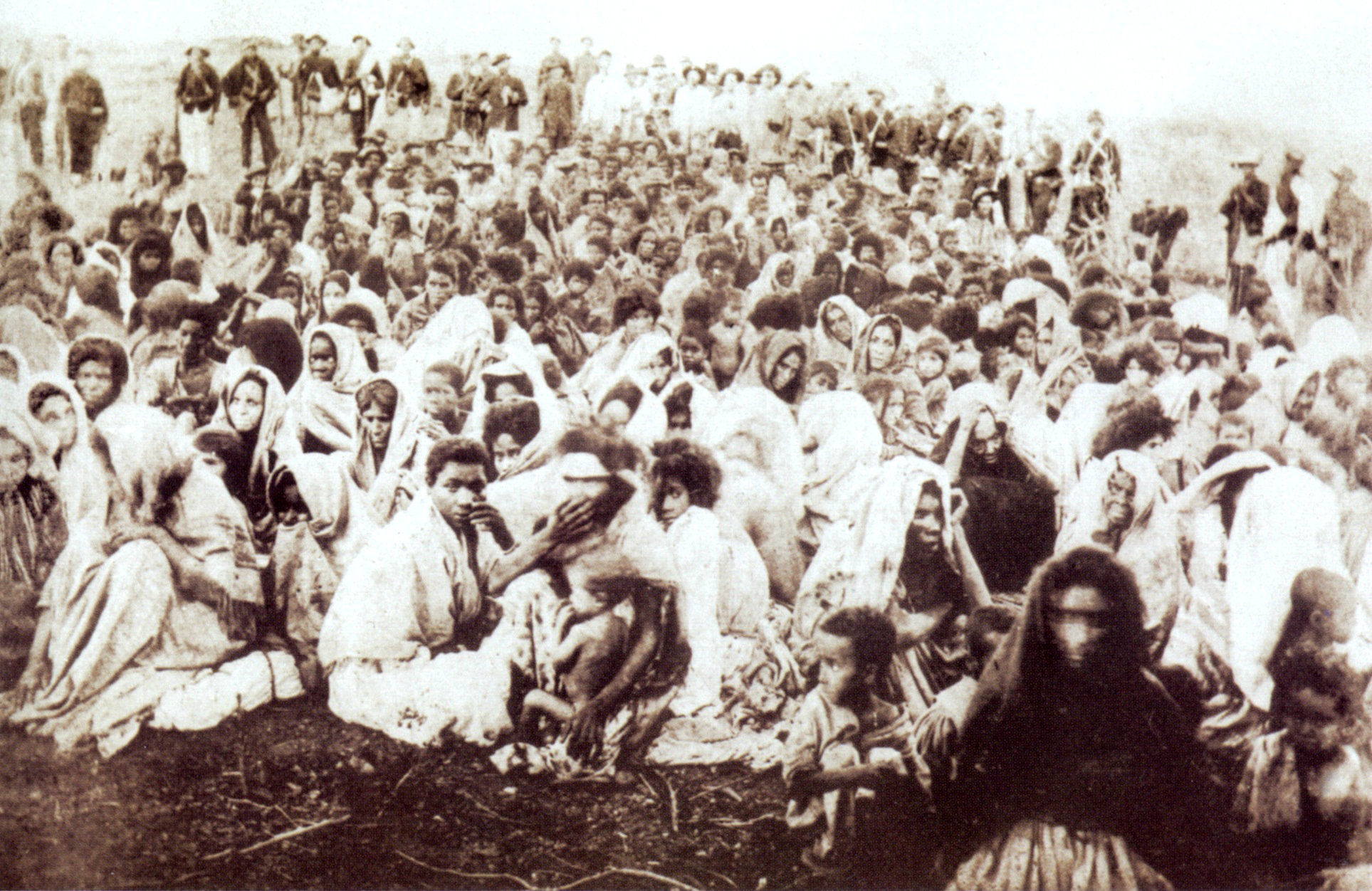
Survivors from Canudos, 1897

It was eventually determined that Antônio Conselheiro himself had likely died of dysentery on 22 September. Before Canudos was burned down and dynamited, Conselheiro's body was exhumed, the head was removed, and it was "displayed on a pike" to be "held high at the front of a military parade for all to see." According to Peter Robb, it "was taken to the Medical Faculty of Bahia to be studied for abnormalities." When all resistance ceased and "peace" was restored, only 150 survivors remained.

Estimates for the number of dead in the War of Canudos vary. Euclides da Cunha (1902) estimated approximately 30,000 (25,000 residents and 5,000 attackers) died; Roelofse-Campbell also gives this estimate. Robert M. Levine, gives a lower figure of around 15,000. Joel Singer estimates only 5,000 dead.

Euclides da Cunha did not see the fighting but did bear witness afterward, Robb says, and his "obsession with progress and modernity, the scientific racism that told him the people of the northeastern interior were doomed to backwardness by their mixed race" led him to tell a story filled with preconceptions — which is, however, the only story we have. Barbara Celarent described Euclides da Cunha's point of view of the war as "a tragic encounter between atavistic barbarism and modern civilization," where "civilization itself reverted to barbarism".

According to Walnice Nogueira Galvão, one of the most important results of the war was the complete "solidification of the republican regime" and final exorcism of "the specter of monarchical restoration". But over time, "public opinion underwent a striking about-face" about the danger of a monarchist conspiracy. "The desperately poor peasants" had been fighting by themselves without help, and had "no connection whatsoever with real monarchists – white, upper-class urbanites, who were horrified at the very thought of associating with such a 'riffraff' of 'fanatics'". The war "turned out to have been an inglorious massacre of destitute wretches", in which the military had made a "common practice – approved by the commanders" – of tying up prisoners and beheading them in public.

== Canudos today ==
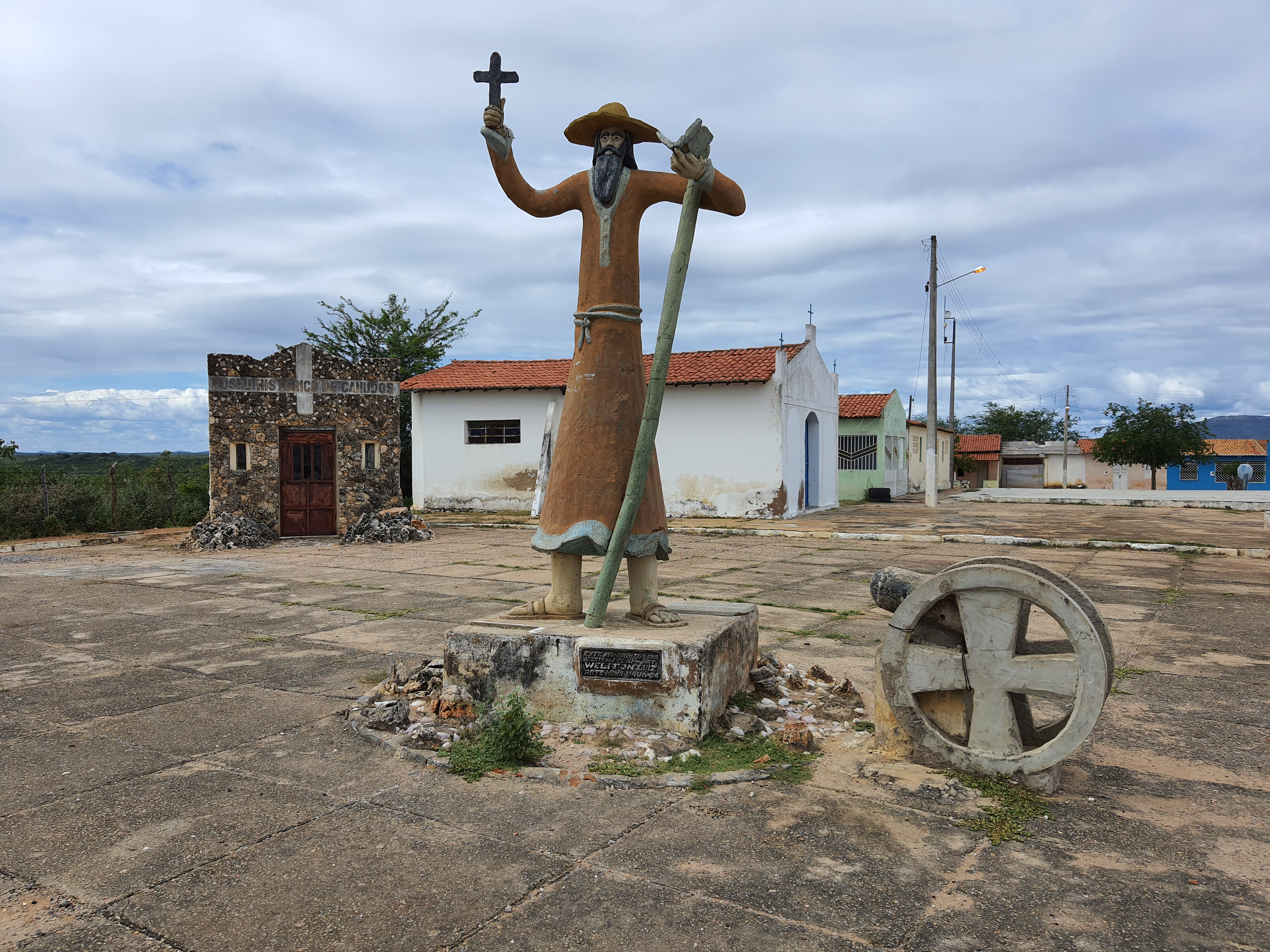
Statue of Antônio Conselheiro

Although the original town of Canudos has been covered by the reservoir of the Cocorobó Dam, built by the military regime in the 1960s, the Canudos State Park, established in 1986, preserves many of the important sites and serves as a monument to the war. The stated purpose of the park is "to make it impossible to forget the martyrs led by Antônio Conselheiro".

== Bibliography ==
- Euclides da Cunha. Os Sertões, 1902. (Rebellion in the Backlands, University of Chicago Press)
- Calasans, José. No Tempo de Antônio Conselheiro. Salvador, Livraria Progresso Editora, 1959.
- Arinos, Afonso. Os Jagunços.
- Macedo Soares, Henrique Duque-Estrada de. A Guerra de Canudos.Rio de Janeiro: Typ. Altiva, 1902
- Benício, Manoel. O Rei dos Jagunços. Rio de Janeiro: Editora Fundação Getúlio Vargas. 2a. edição, 1997
- Mario Vargas Llosa. The War of the End of the World. Novel. 1981

== Media ==
- Guerra de Canudos (The Battle of Canudos). Motion picture directed by Sérgio Rezende, with José Wilker, Cláudia Abreu, Paulo Betti, and Marieta Severo. Brazil, 1997.
- Sobreviventes – Os Filhos da Guerra de Canudos (Survivors, the Children of the War of Canudos). Documentary film by Paulo Fontenelle, Brazil, 2007.
- Canudos. Documentary film by Ipojuca Pontes, with Walmor Chagas, Brazil, 1978.
- War of Canudos in Brazil. Documentary radio broadcast, BBC World Service. Mon 9 June 2014 07:50 GMT.
- Hell Clock, Video Game (Fiction, set in Canudos).

== See also ==
- Revolutions of Brazil
- List of wars involving Brazil
- Juazeiro Sedition
- Caldeirão de Santa Cruz do Deserto
- Contestado War
