= Monte Santo, Bahia =

Municipality of Bahia, Brazil

Coordinates: 10°26′16″S 39°19′58″W

Monte Santo
- Municipality
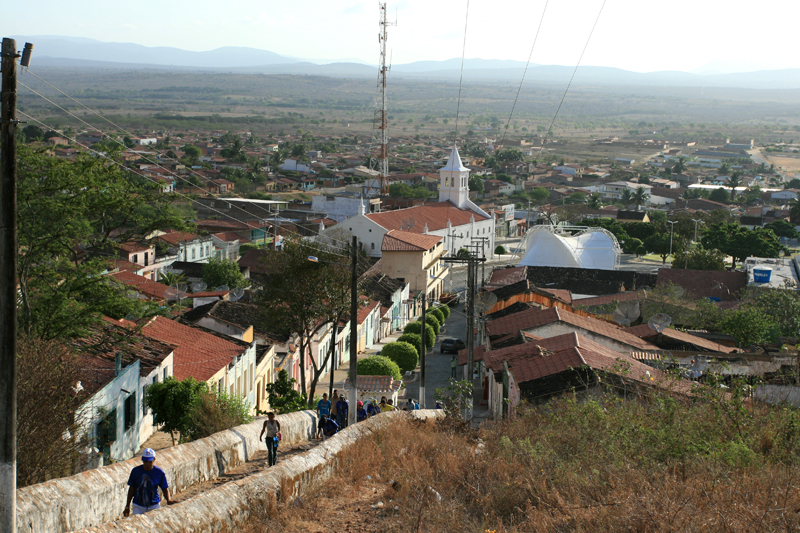

- Flag Coat of arms
- Interactive map of Monte Santo
- Country: Brazil
- Region: Nordeste
- State: Bahia

Area
  - Total: 1,230 sq mi (3,186 km^{2})

Population (2020)
  - Total: 49,278
- Time zone: UTC−3 (BRT)

Monte Santo (Portuguese pronunciation: [ˈmõtʃi ˈsɐ̃tu]) is a municipality in the state of Bahia in the North-East region of Brazil.

== Climate ==
Monte Santo experiences a hot semi-arid climate (Koppen BSh) despite receiving 600 mm of annual precipitation.

Climate data for Monte Santo (1981–2010)
Month	Jan	Feb	Mar	Apr	May	Jun	Jul	Aug	Sep	Oct	Nov	Dec	Year
Mean daily maximum °C (°F)	32.8 (91.0)	32.8 (91.0)	32.4 (90.3)	31.0 (87.8)	29.1 (84.4)	26.8 (80.2)	26.4 (79.5)	27.4 (81.3)	29.9 (85.8)	32.0 (89.6)	32.6 (90.7)	32.8 (91.0)	30.5 (86.9)
Daily mean °C (°F)	26.3 (79.3)	26.4 (79.5)	26.1 (79.0)	25.2 (77.4)	23.7 (74.7)	21.9 (71.4)	21.3 (70.3)	21.6 (70.9)	23.3 (73.9)	25.0 (77.0)	25.8 (78.4)	26.2 (79.2)	24.4 (75.9)
Mean daily minimum °C (°F)	20.7 (69.3)	20.9 (69.6)	21.0 (69.8)	20.6 (69.1)	19.6 (67.3)	18.3 (64.9)	17.5 (63.5)	17.5 (63.5)	18.2 (64.8)	19.4 (66.9)	20.1 (68.2)	20.6 (69.1)	19.5 (67.1)
Average precipitation mm (inches)	55.5 (2.19)	57.6 (2.27)	68.0 (2.68)	63.0 (2.48)	52.6 (2.07)	62.7 (2.47)	51.0 (2.01)	34.8 (1.37)	18.9 (0.74)	25.2 (0.99)	49.8 (1.96)	64.0 (2.52)	603.1 (23.74)
Average precipitation days (≥ 1.0 mm)	4	5	6	7	9	12	13	9	5	3	4	5	82
Average relative humidity (%)	61.7	61.3	64.1	70.1	76.1	82.6	82.0	78.9	70.9	64.5	62.7	60.8	69.6
Mean monthly sunshine hours	234.3	206.7	217.3	195.3	178.1	128.2	160.6	185.5	221.3	232.5	228.4	236	2,424.2
Source: Instituto Nacional de Meteorologia

== See also ==
- List of municipalities in Bahia
