= Vaza-Barris River =

River in Brazil

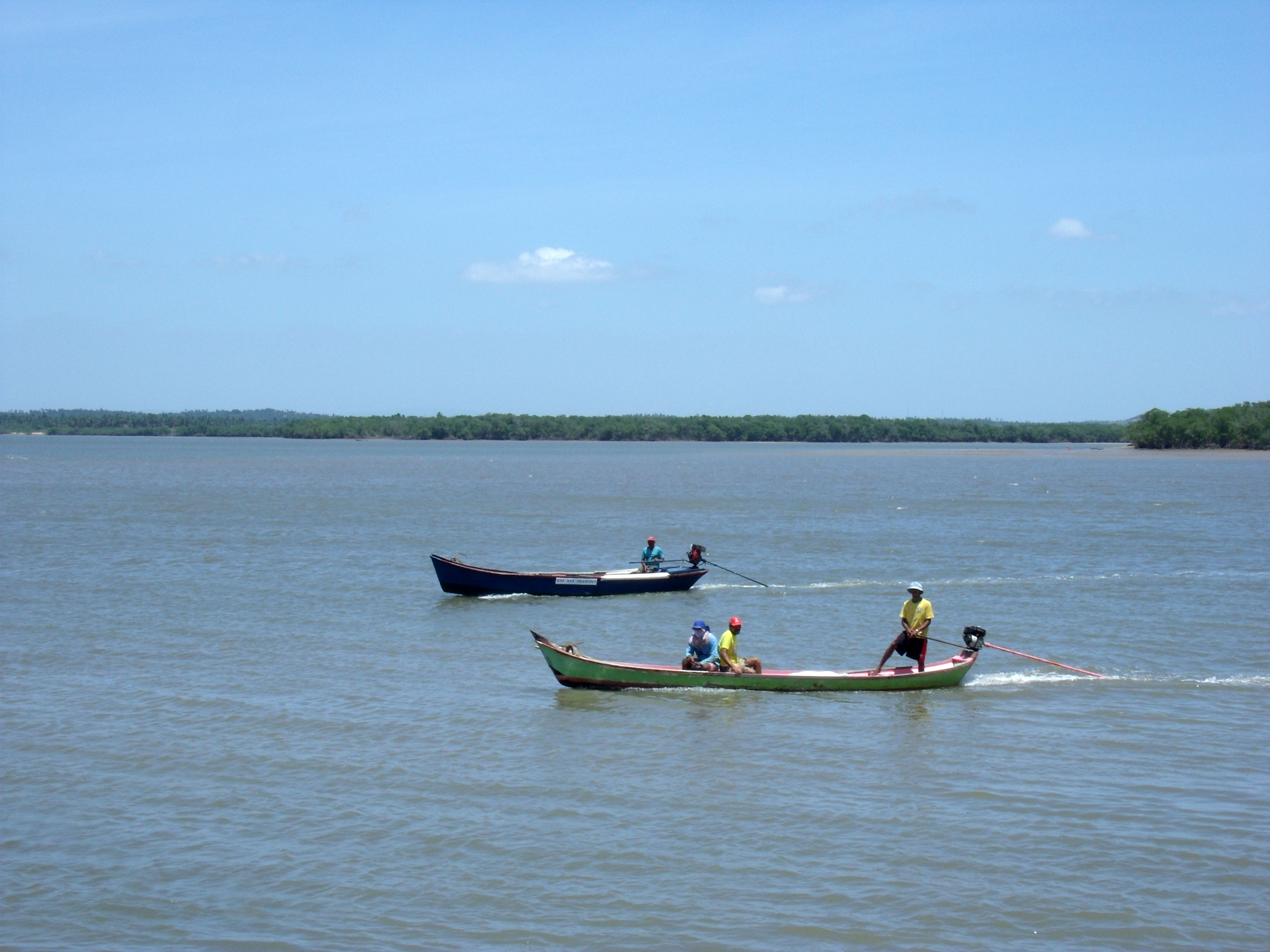

- Location within Brazil
- Native name: Rio Vaza-Barris (Portuguese)

Location
- Country: Brazil

Physical characteristics
- Source
  - location: Bahia
- Mouth
  - location: Atlantic Ocean
  - coordinates: 11°10′17″S 37°09′49″W
- Length: 450 kilometres (280 mi)

The Vaza-Barris River (Portuguese: Rio Vaza-Barris) is a river in northeastern Brazil. The Vaza-Barris originates in northeastern Bahia state, and flows east through Bahia and Sergipe states to empty into the Atlantic Ocean near São Cristóvão.

== Course ==
The Vaza-Barris is a perennial river about 450 kilometres (280 mi) in length. The source of the river is at the foot of the Serra dos Macacos in interior of Bahia near the town of Uauá. In the municipality of Canudos, Bahia, the river is impounded by the Cocorobó Dam. Its watershed above the dam drains an area of 3,600 square kilometres (1,400 sq mi). Further east, the river defines the south boundary of the Serra Branca / Raso da Catarina Environmental Protection Area in the municipality of Jeremoabo, Bahia. After leaving Bahia it flows through Sergipe to the coast.

== See also ==
- List of rivers of Bahia
- List of rivers of Sergipe

== Sources ==
- Açude Cocorobó (in Portuguese), DNOCS, archived from the original on 2016-08-08
- APA Serra Branca / Raso da Catarina (in Portuguese), INEMA: Instituto do Meio Ambiente e Recursos Hídricos (BA)
- "Cocorobó Dam", IndustryAbout.com, archived from the original on November 4, 2016
- Proposta inclui a Bacia do Rio Vaza-Barris na área de atuação da Codevasf (in Portuguese), Chamber of Deputies (Brazil), 16 January 2014
