= Raso da Catarina =

Ecoregion in Brazil

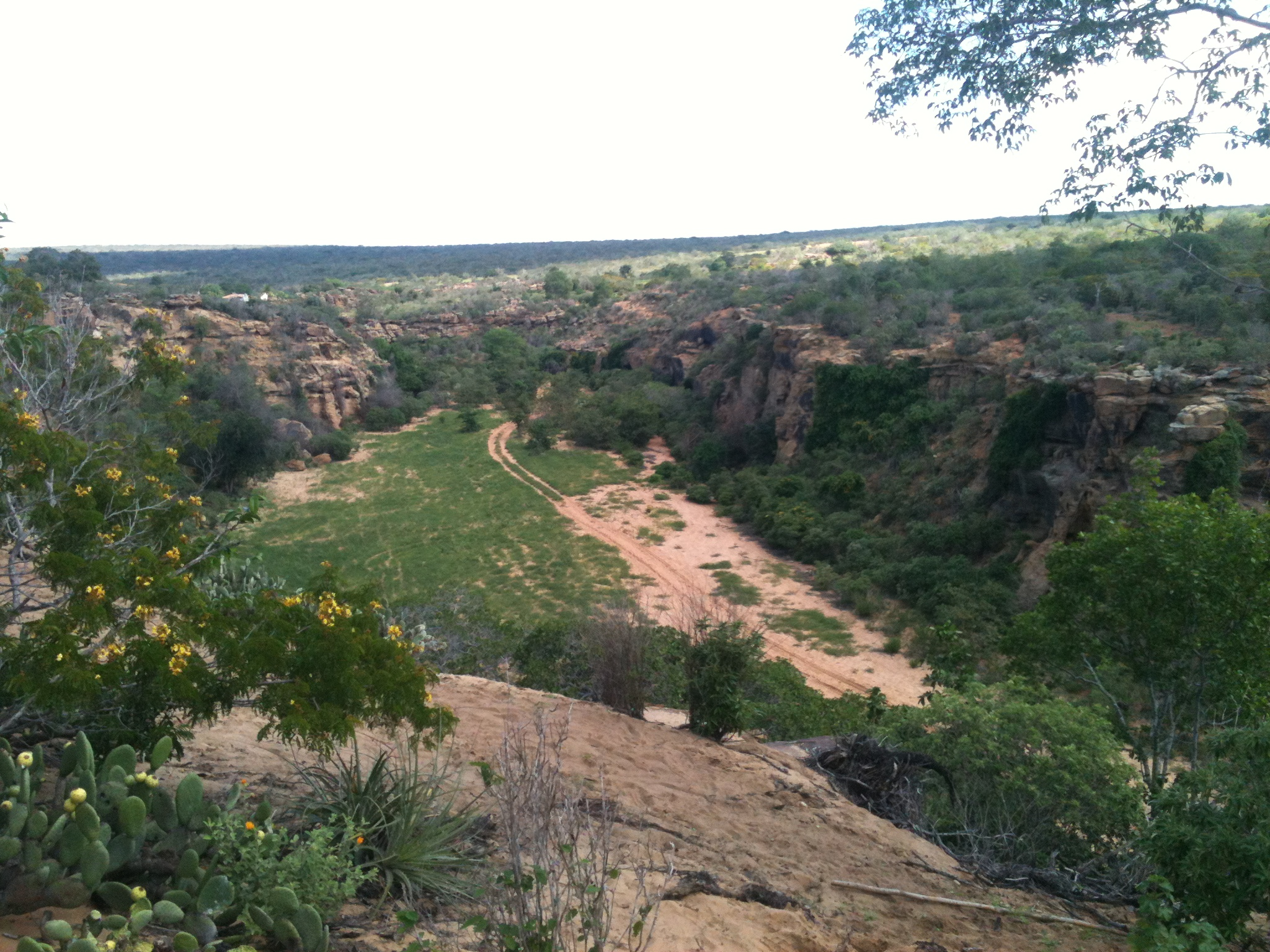
- Raso da Catarina

- Raso da Catarina (Brazil) Location in Brazil

Ecology
- Biome: Caatinga

Geography
- Country: Brazil
- State: Bahia, Pernambuco
- Coordinates: 9.762937°S 38.524086°W

The Raso da Catarina is an ecoregion in the caatinga biome of Bahia and Pernambuco, Brazil. It is a sandstone plateau, much eroded, that is extremely dry for most of the year. Vegetation includes low bushes, often thorny, cacti and bromeliads.

== Location ==
The core of the Raso da Caterina roughly corresponds to a rectangle bounded by the São Francisco River to the north, BR-110 to the east, Vaza-Barris River to the south and BR-116 to the west. It contains the communities of Cocorobó in the southwest and Paulo Afonso in the northeast, and holds the Serra Branca in the south. It has an area of about 5,000 square kilometres (1,900 sq mi), and covers parts of the municipalities of Paulo Afonso, Jeremoabo, Canudos and Macururé. The core Raso da Caterina is a sandstone plateau that dates back to the Cretaceous. The landscape has many canyons and rocks carved by erosion into huge obelisks.

In a broader sense the Raso da Catarina Ecoregion comprises portions of the states of Pernambuco and Bahia in a long and narrow north-south strip in the central-eastern part of the biome. It covers 30,800 square kilometres (11,900 sq mi) defined by the natural geomorphological limits of the Tucano-Jatoba sedimentary basin. It has deep soils, excessively drained, acidic and very low fertility. In Bahia it includes parts of the municipalities of Canudos, Cícero Dantas, Chorrochó, Euclides da Cunha, Glória, Jeremoabo, Macururé, Paulo Afonso, Ribeira do Pombal, Rodelas, Santa Brígida and Uauá.

== Environment ==
The region is located in the driest part of the state of Bahia, classified as a transition zone between the arid and semi-arid regions. Temperatures range from 15 to 43 °C (59 to 109 °F). The Raso da Catarina is one of eight ecoregions of the caatinga domain in the Tucano-Jatobá sedimentary basin. It is in the east-central portion of the area, characterized by a markedly seasonal climate that has severe for drought ten to eleven months of the year.

The Köppen climate classification is mostly Bsh, with very irregular rainfall, high temperatures and strong evaporation. The vegetation is caatinga, including highly-branched bushes, often thorny, 2 to 3 metres (6 ft 7 in to 9 ft 10 in) high, cacti and bromeliads. Full-size trees are rare. The vegetation is denser and less spiny than caatinga on crystalline soils.

== History ==
The War of Canudos, led by the religious preacher Antônio Conselheiro, caused a confrontation between peasants and republican troops. Between 1896 and 1897 about 30,000 people died in the slaughter. Many of the relics of that time are now submerged by the Cocorobó Dam. Later the outlaw "Lampião" (Virgulino Ferreira), also known as the "King of Cangaço", found shelter in the region.

== Conservation ==
The region is considered a priority areas for conservation, sustainable use and sharing of the benefits of biodiversity in the Caatinga Ecological Corridor, established in 2006. Conservation units in the region include:

Name	Level	Size	Created
Canudos State Park	State	1,321	1986
Corobobó (Cocorobó) Area of Relevant Ecological Interest	Federal	7,473	1984
Raso da Catarina Ecological Station	Federal	104,842	2001
Serra Branca / Raso da Catarina Environmental Protection Area	State	67,234	2001
Serra Negra Biological Reserve	State	624	1982

== Sources ==
- Amorim, Vivian Oliveira; Bautista, Hortensia Pousada (2016), "Asteraceae da Ecorregião Raso da Catarina, Bahia, Brasil" (PDF), Rodriguésia, 67 (3): 785–794, doi:10.1590/2175-7860201667317
- Guedes, Rejan R. (January–June 1985), "Lista preliminar das angiospermas ocorrentes no Raso da Catarina e arredores, Bahia", Rodriguésia, 37 (62): 5–8, doi:10.1590/2175-78601985376201, JSTOR 23496036
- "Lampião e Conselheiro no Raso da Catarina", Bahia! (in Portuguese)
- Mattos, Marluza (2006), Ministério cria Corredor Ecológico da Caatinga (in Portuguese), Ministério do Meio Ambiente
