= Illustrations of the Family of Psittacidae, or Parrots =

1832 book by Edward Lear

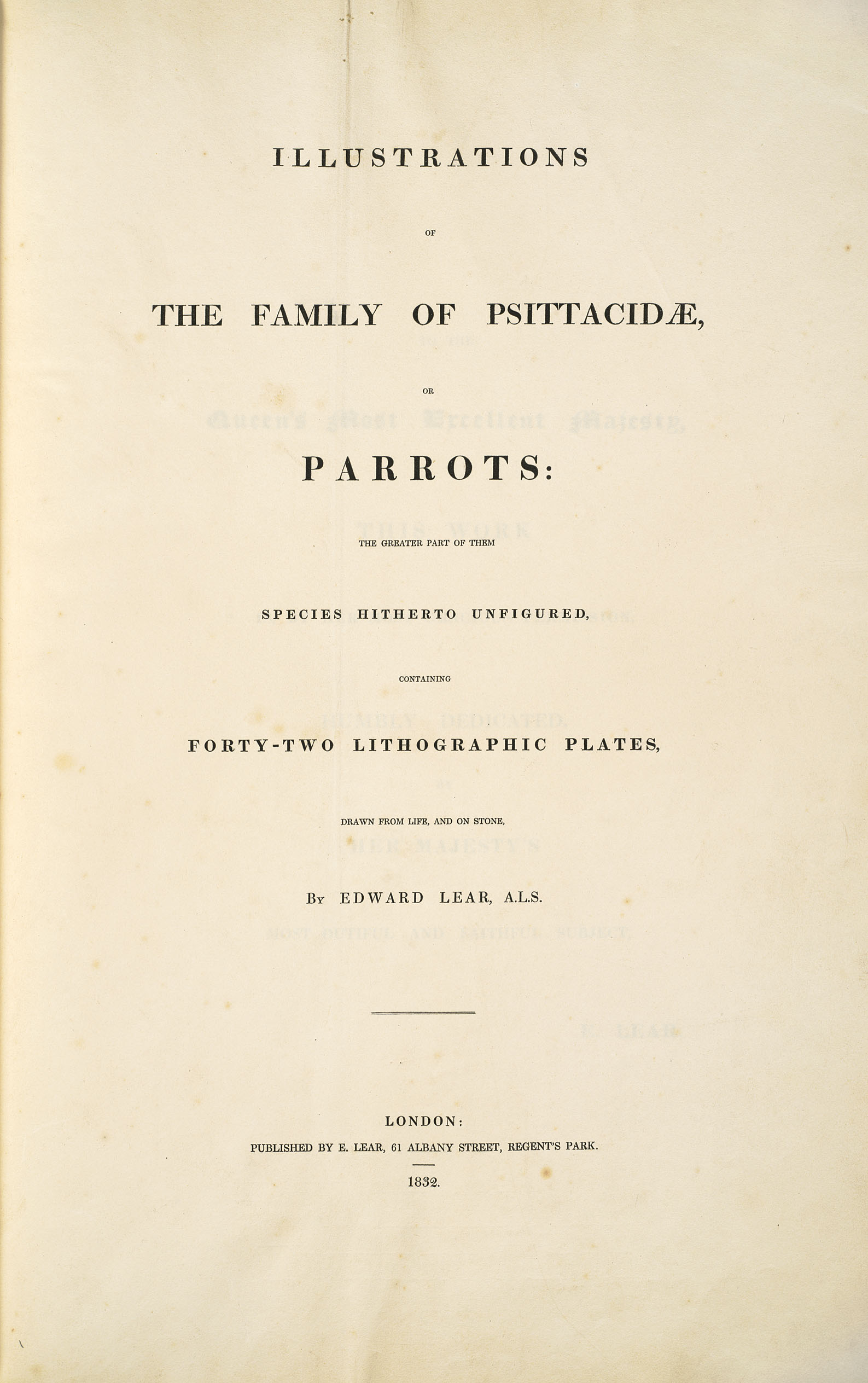
- Book title page
- Author: Edward Lear
- Language: English
- Subject: Parrots
- Genre: Ornithology
- Publisher: Edward Lear
- Publication date: 1832
- Publication place: United Kingdom
- Pages: 42 colour illustrations

Illustrations of the Family of Psittacidae, or Parrots is an 1832 book containing 42 hand-coloured lithographs by Edward Lear. He produced 175 copies for sale to subscribers as a part-publication, which were later bound as a book. Lear started painting parrots in 1830 when he was 18 years old, and to get material for his book he studied live birds at the London Zoo and in private collections. The latter included those of Edward Smith Stanley, later 13th Earl of Derby, who had a large menagerie at Knowsley Hall, and Benjamin Leadbeater, a taxidermist and trader in specimens. Lear drew onto lithographic plates for printing by Charles Joseph Hullmandel, who was known for the quality of his reproductions of fine art.

Although the book was a financial failure, Lear's paintings of parrots established his reputation as one of the best natural history artists of his time. It found him work with John Gould, Stanley and other leading contemporary naturalists, and the young Queen Victoria engaged him to help her with her painting technique. Parrots was a forerunner to the major volumes of bird paintings by Gould, and Lear's serious work has influenced bird specialists like William T. Cooper, Elizabeth Butterworth, and Walton Ford.

Lear continued with his nature painting for some years, but from about 1835 he became concerned about his failing eyesight, and increasingly concentrated on his nonsense works and landscape painting, although he may have contributed to the illustrations for Charles Darwin's Voyage of the Beagle.

== Background ==
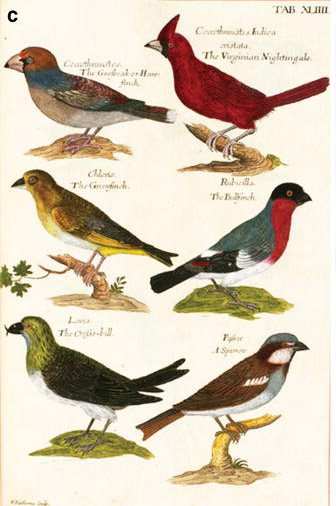
Plate XLIII from Samuel Pepys's hand-coloured copy of Francis Willughby's 1678 Ornithology

Early scientific works on birds, such as those of Conrad Gessner, Ulisse Aldrovandi and Pierre Belon, relied for much of their content on the authority of the Ancient Greek philosopher Aristotle and the teachings of the church, and included much extraneous material relating to the species, such as proverbs, references in history and literature, or its use as an emblem. The arrangement of the species was by alphabetical order in Gessner's Historia animalium, and by arbitrary criteria in most other early works. In the late 16th and early 17th centuries, Francis Bacon had advocated the advancement of knowledge through observation and experiment, and the English Royal Society and its members such as John Ray, John Wilkins and Francis Willughby sought to put the empirical method into practice, including travelling widely to collect specimens and information.

The first modern ornithology, intended to describe all the then-known birds worldwide, was produced by Ray and Willughby and published in Latin as Ornithologiae Libri Tres (Three Books of Ornithology) in 1676, and in English, as The Ornithology of Francis Willughby of Middleton, in 1678. Its innovative features were an effective classification system based on anatomical features, including the bird's beak, feet and overall size, and a dichotomous key, which helped readers to identify birds by guiding them to the page describing that group. The authors also placed an asterisk against species of which they had no first-hand knowledge, and were therefore unable to verify. The commercial success of the Ornithology is unknown, but it was historically significant, influencing writers including René Réaumur, Mathurin Jacques Brisson, Georges Cuvier and Carl Linnaeus in compiling their own works.

George Edwards was a leading British naturalist and illustrator in the 17th century. He was the librarian to the Royal College of Physicians with access to their collection of 8,000 books, and he used these, together with stuffed and live animals, to produce illustrated publications. His four-volume A Natural History of Uncommon Birds (1743–1751) and its three supplements covered more than 600 natural history topics, and his publications enabled Linnaeus to name 350 bird species, including many type specimens.

During the early 19th century, several ornithologies were written in English, and Edward Lear's main contributions to the development of bird painting were to concentrate on a single bird group, in his case the parrots, paint mainly from live birds rather than stuffed specimens or skins, and use a large page size. Lear was not the first to produce an illustrated parrot monograph. French artist Jacques Barraband created 145 images for François Levaillant's Histoire Naturelle des Perroquets (1801–1805). Lear's book had an immediate effect, including its impact on John Gould's five-volume Birds of Europe, which was published between 1832 and 1837.

== Edward Lear ==
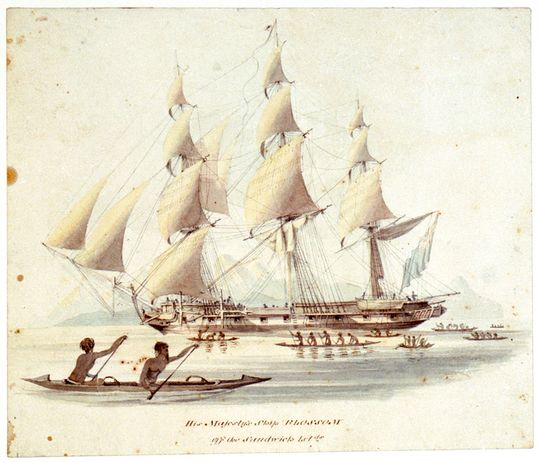
The voyage of HMS Blossom provided Edward Lear with his first major commission.

Edward Lear was born on 12 May 1812 in Holloway, North London, (Note: Until he was middle-aged, Lear celebrated his birthday on 13 May. It appears that he was born shortly before midnight, leading to some confusion in the family. Lear usually said he was from Highgate, Holloway's much smarter neighbouring suburb.) the penultimate (and youngest to survive) of perhaps 21 children of Jeremiah and Ann (née Skerrett) Lear. (Note: Lear himself was not consistent on the number of his siblings, and the fact that the family reused the names of children who died young means that the true figure could be lower.) Jeremiah was a stockbroker who in 1816 defaulted to the London Stock Exchange to the tune of £2150 11s. 1d. (Note: About £168,300 at 2020 prices calculated using MeasuringWorth.) in the economic turmoil following the Napoleonic Wars. The family left their home, Bowmans Lodge, and Edward was raised by his eldest sister, also named Ann, 21 years his senior. Partly because he suffered from epilepsy, bronchitis and asthma, Ann acted as a mother to him from when he was four until her death when he was almost 50 years old.

Ann and another of Edward's sisters, Sarah, were both competent artists and taught their brother to draw and paint. From 1827, aged about 15, Edward was taking paid work, including medical illustrations. His first major commission was to illustrate an account of the scientific discoveries of a Royal Navy expedition to the Pacific. HMS Blossom, commanded by Captain Frederick W. Beechey, had a successful three-year voyage (1825–1828), visiting California, the Pitcairn Islands, Tahiti, and previously largely unknown parts of northwest North America. Lear painted 12 plates of birds and two of mammals for The Zoology of Captain Beechey's Voyage, probably in 1829, when he was aged 17, or in 1830. Long delays by another contributor, the keeper of zoology at the British Museum, Edward Gray, meant that the book was more than ten years out of date when it was finally published in 1839, several other expeditions having taken place in the interim.

== Research ==
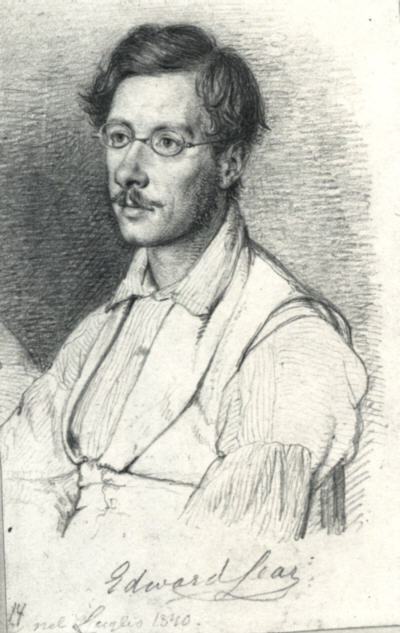
Lear in 1840

Lear's plan was to produce 175 copies of a large folio book, (Note: Large folio is 53.7 by 36.5 centimetres (21.1 in × 14.4 in).) larger than any European nature painter had previously used. He met and became friends with John James Audubon, who had just published his 1827 double elephant-size The Birds of America, and this book may have inspired him to also choose a large format.

The publication was to be sold by subscription as fourteen parts, each priced at ten shillings, a total cost of £7. (Note: About £630 at 2020 prices, calculated using MeasuringWorth.) Its full title as published was Illustrations of the family of Psittacidæ, or parrots: the greater part of them species hitherto unfigured, containing forty-two lithographic plates, drawn from life, and on stone, as printed on the title page of the book. The first subscribers included a friend, Mrs Anne Wentworth, and her sisters and daughter, followed by leading naturalists, including the London Zoo's Nicholas Vigors and the president of the Linnean Society, Edward Smith-Stanley, later 13th Earl of Derby. Subscribers from the aristocracy included the Duke of Norfolk, the Earl of Egremont, and the Duke of Northumberland and his Duchess. The London Zoological Society and the Linnean Society also subscribed as organisations.

Lear's early sketchbooks include sketches and drawings of parrots, including a citron-crested cockatoo, a watercolour of two green parrots, and another of a blue macaw's head with two of its feathers, but for his project he needed access to live birds. In June 1830 he was given permission by the Zoological Society of London (ZSL) to sketch at London Zoo, and he also had access to the zoo's museum in nearby Bruton Street. As well as skins and stuffed birds, the museum also had aviaries with some live birds. Although other artists were not granted similar access, (Note: The zoologist and author William Swainson was refused similar access, and when he nevertheless entered in the company of Audubon, he was prevented from taking notes.) Lear was introduced to the ZSL by the well-connected Mrs Wentworth, who was interested in both art and natural history. He also painted parrots owned by Stanley and Vigors, and saw several species, including Baudin's black cockatoo, in the collection of Benjamin Leadbeater, a taxidermist and trader in specimens. When he could not view live birds, Lear resorted to Gould's stuffed specimens.

== Production ==
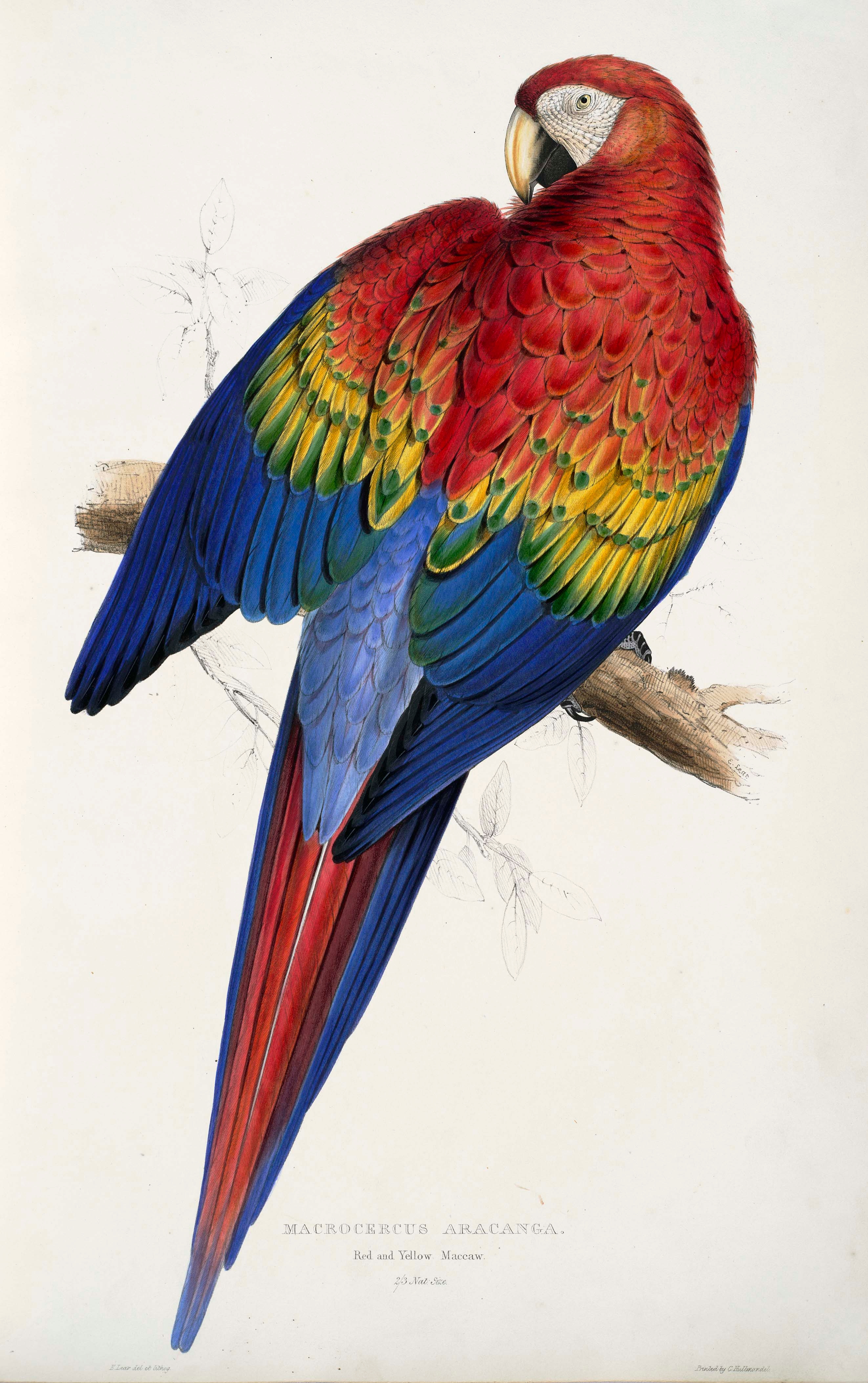
Scarlet macaw, captioned on plate 7 as Macrocercus Aracanga, red and yellow macaw, with the incorrect binomial nomenclature and common name.

Lear's illustrations were produced using lithography, in which artists copied their paintings onto a fine-textured limestone slab using a special waxy crayon. The block was then treated with nitric acid and gum arabic to etch away the parts of the stone not protected by the wax. The etched surface was wetted before adding an oil-based ink, which would be held only by the greasy crayon lines, and copies were printed from the stone. The printed plates were hand-coloured, mainly by young women.

Lear drew directly on to the limestone instead of first making a painting and then copying it onto the stone, thus saving him considerable expense. Although this method was technically more difficult, drawing directly onto stone could give a livelier feel to the final illustration, and was favoured by some other contemporary bird artists such as John Gerrard Keulemans. Lear largely taught himself lithographic techniques, using stones hired at the studio of his printer, Charles Joseph Hullmandel. Hullmandel was the author of The Art of Drawing on Stone (1824), and the leading exponent of lithographic printing in Britain. (Note: Hullmandel charged 4d to 18d per month for his blocks, depending on size.) His colourists used egg white to give a sheen to the parrot's plumage and a shine to the bird's eye. Lear designed wrappers for each part, but changed the design when he was granted permission to dedicate his book to Queen Adelaide, consort of King William IV.

Lear struggled with the costs of producing his book, despite erasing his drawings as soon as he had the necessary 175 copies, to reduce the expense of hiring the lithographic blocks. He ran out of funds when he had printed only twelve of the intended fourteen parts, with 42 plates and no text. He sold only 125 subscriptions, and not all his subscribers actually paid what they owed. To help with funds, Lear worked for Gould from 1832 to 1837, illustrating his five-part Birds of Europe and teaching lithography to Gould's wife, Elizabeth. Lear still owed money for his parrots book, and in March 1833 he sold the remaining 50 copies and the rights to the plates to Gould for £50. (Note: About £4,850 at 2020 prices calculated using MeasuringWorth.)

== Reception ==
The sheer cost of producing his book meant that the final two parts were never completed and it was a financial failure, although Lear had anticipated this possibility, saying "Their publication was a speculation which — so far as it made me known & procured me employment in Zoological drawing — answered my expectations — but in matters of money occasioned me considerable loss."

The first two parts were published on 1 November 1830, and Lear, still only 18, was promptly nominated for membership of the Linnean Society by Vigors and the zoologists Thomas Bell and Edward Bennett. Audubon bought a copy of the final bound book, despite its cost and his own limited funds, William Swainson asked for duplicates of two plates that he could have framed and hang next to his Audubon paintings, and Prideaux John Selby said the plates were "beautifully coloured & I think infinitely superior to Audubon's in softness and the drawing as good".

Parrots established Lear as a leading nature painter, and he was continually in demand thereafter.

== Related works ==
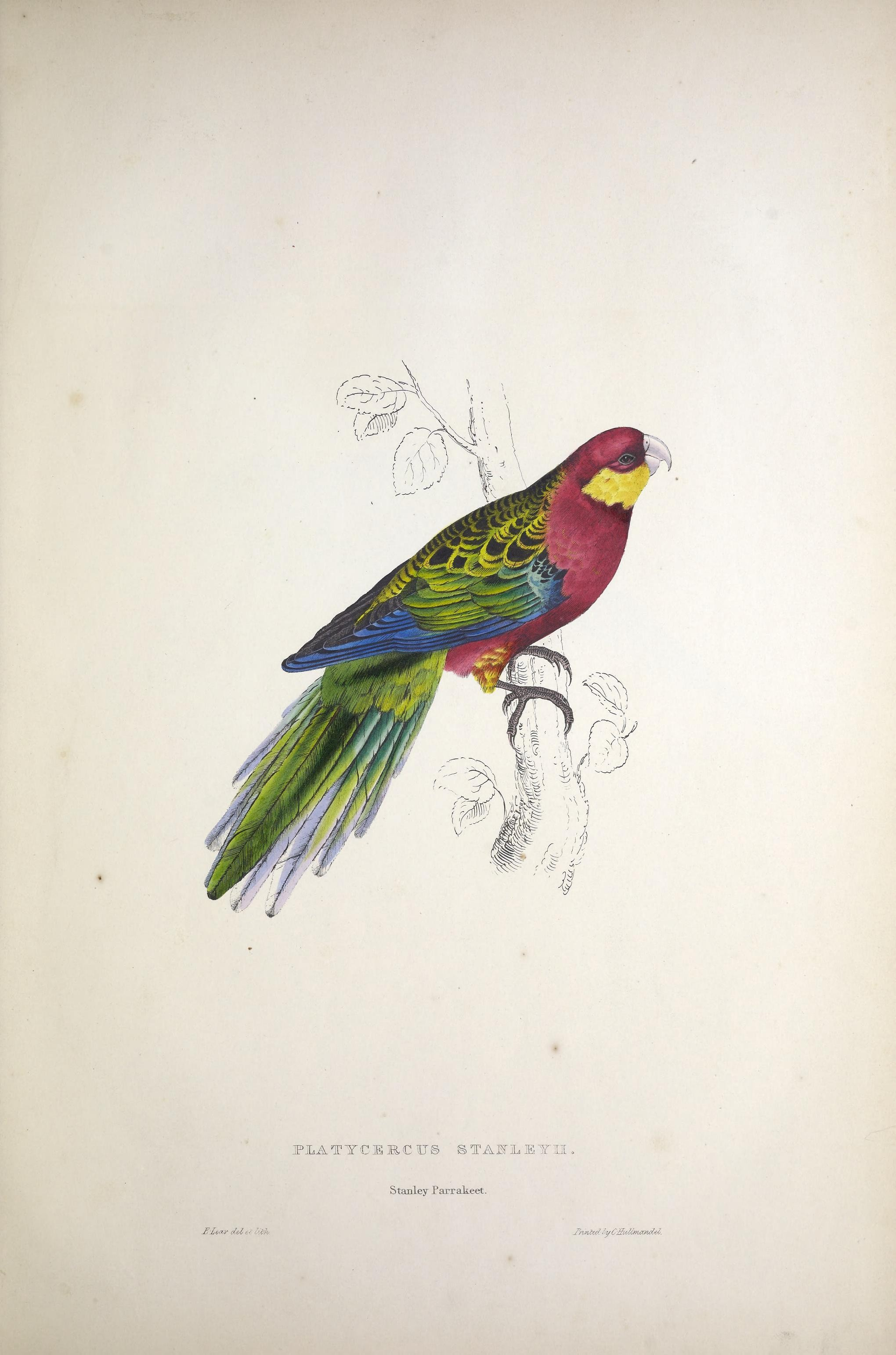
Male Stanley's parrakeet, now western rosella, plate 23, painted from one of Lord Stanley's birds

When Lear sold his remaining copies of Parrots to Gould, part of the agreement was that Lear would travel to the zoos of continental Europe with him to collect material for Birds of Europe. The trip, initially delayed by Elizabeth Gould's premature labour and the Goulds getting influenza, took place in July 1833, and Lear eventually produced 68 plates for the book, acknowledged by Gould. He produced at least ten plates for Gould's A Monograph of the Ramphastidae, or Family of Toucans. Although he signed several plates in the first edition, his signatures had disappeared in the second edition of 1854. Lear painted backgrounds for some of the plates in A Monograph of the Trogonidae, or Family of Trogons (1835–1838) but all 36 plates are signed only as by John and Elizabeth Gould.

Lear was fond of Elizabeth Gould, and admired John for his work ethic, but he disliked him as a person. When Gould died in 1881, Lear wrote "One I never liked really... a harsh and violent man... ever as unfeeling for those about him."

Lear did not work exclusively for Gould. He had been doing watercolours for Selby's British Ornithology (1821–1834) since he was 16, and from 1825 he painted for Selby's collaboration with William Jardine, Illustrations of Ornithology. He also illustrated Jardine's Illustrations of the Duck Tribe, and created paintings, mainly of pigeons and parrots, for Jardine's The Naturalist's Library.

Stanley became Lear's most important patron when he inherited his father's title in 1834. Now Lord Derby, he used the grounds of the ancestral home, Knowsley Hall, to create a private zoo in its 69 hectares (170 acres) estate, and he employed Lear to paint watercolours of many of the creatures in his menagerie. (Note: At its peak, Knowsley's collection contained around 20,000 individual animals. It had representatives of 619 bird species, including 114 species of parrots, 51 raptors and 60 game birds.)

From about 1835, Lear became concerned about his eyesight, claiming "no birds under an ostrich should I soon be able to see to do", and increasingly concentrated on his nonsense works and landscape painting, although he may have contributed to the illustrations for Charles Darwin's Voyage of the Beagle. In 1846, he was invited to give lessons to the young Queen Victoria to improve her landscape painting. He gave the young queen ten lessons at Osborne House in July, and two more at Buckingham Palace in August. Victoria sent Lear an engraving as a present the next winter; Lear told his sister Ann about the gift, but said she should not tell anyone else lest it look like boasting.

== Legacy ==
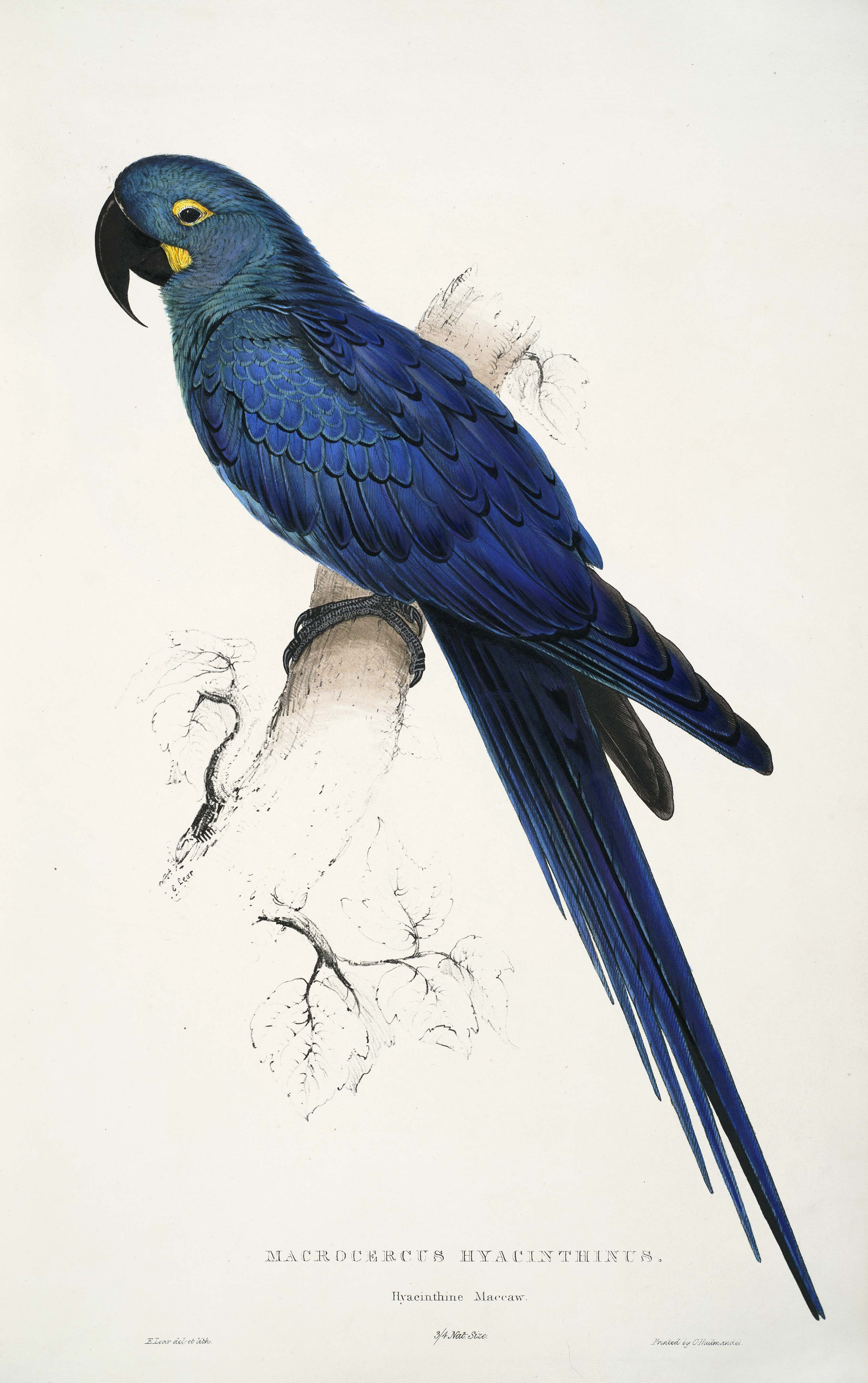
Lear's Macaw plate 9, captioned as Macrocercus hyacinthinus, Hyacinthine macaw

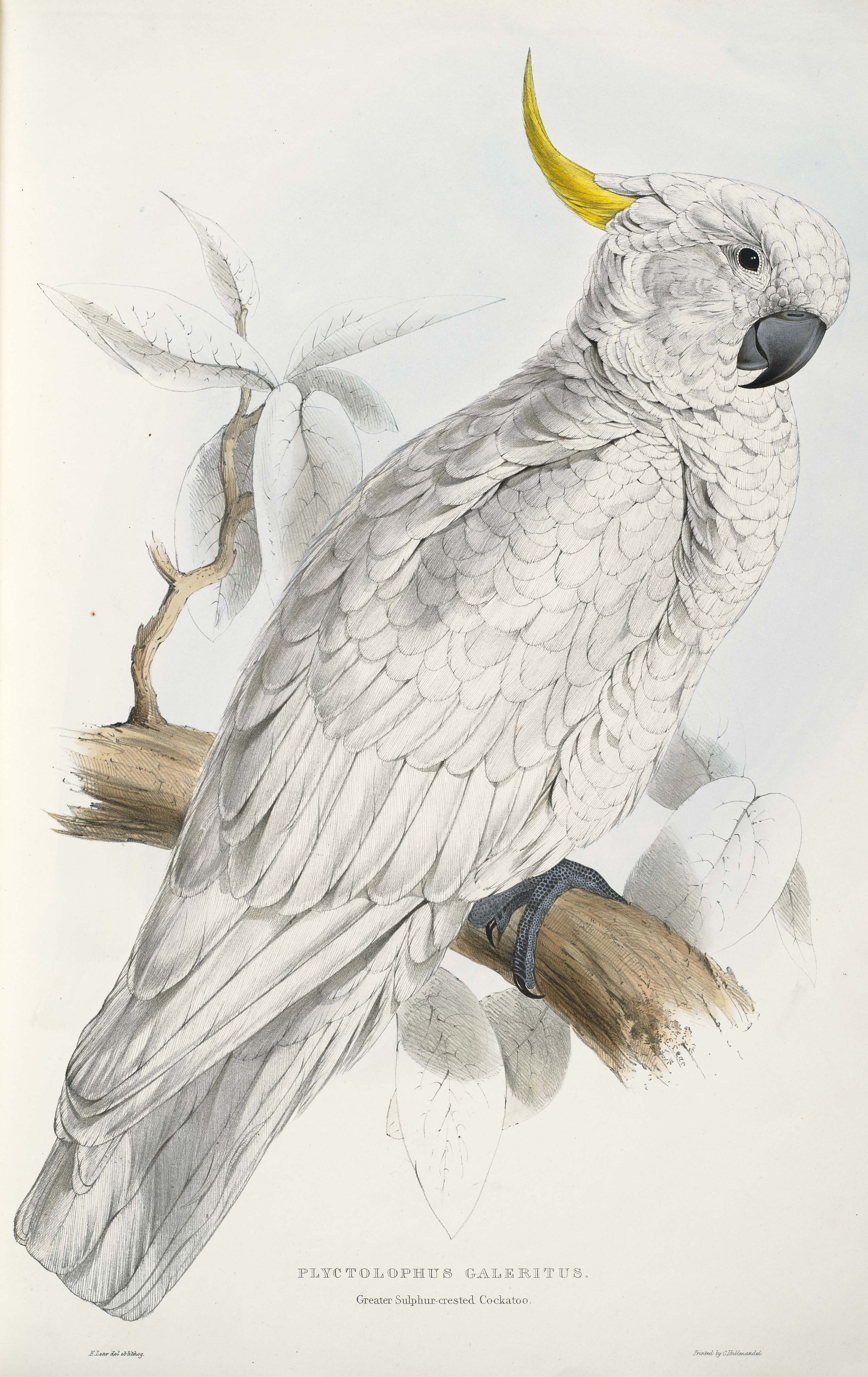
Greater sulphur-crested cockatoo, plate 3, marked as cacatua galerita

An immediate effect of the reputational success of Lear's parrot book was its influence on Gould. Until then he was primarily a taxidermist, often working for the Zoological Society of London, with just one published book, his 1832 A Century of Birds from the Himalaya Mountains, with backgrounds painted by Lear. (Note: The term "century" in the title refers to a count of 100 birds, rather than a 100-year period, as Lear aimed to depict a hundred rare Indian bird species; 102 were actually included.) Following Parrots, Gould decided to produce books based on Lear's model, using Hullmandel as his printer, and over the next twenty years produced some 40 volumes.

Lear's macaw Anodorhynchus leari was named by Charles Lucien Bonaparte in 1856. Bonaparte had identified it as a new species from Lear's accurate painting in his book, which had been captioned as a hyacinthine macaw. Two other parrot species named for Lear, the cockatoo Lapochroa leari (now Major Mitchell's cockatoo) and the parakeet Platycercus leari (now crimson rosella) are no longer accepted under those names.

Lear was the first to describe five of the species and subspecies depicted. His plates are the therefore the holotypes and he is the authority. These are the Australasian species Baudin's black cockatoo (Plate 6 as Calyptorhynchus Baudinii), Antipodes parakeet (Pl 25 as Platycercus unicolor), regent parrot (Pl 29 as Platycercus anthopeplus), varied lorikeet (Pl 36 as Trichoglossus versicolor) and the pale-headed rosella subspecies Platycercus adscitus palliceps (Pl 19 as Platycercus palliceps).

Lear's influence on illustrators of children's books, such as Beatrix Potter and Maurice Sendak was more through his nonsense books than his bird paintings, but other illustrators made more conscious use of his avian works. William T. Cooper and Elizabeth Butterworth both painted birds from life, and made deliberate efforts to incorporate elements of Lear's style; Butterworth has illustrated four books on parrots, including Amazon Parrots: A Monograph, written by Rosemary Low.

Other contemporary artists used Lear's style with a modern twist. Walton Ford paints parrots, but often in settings that show them in potentially lethal situations involving traps or predators. Like Lear, Ford frequently has marginal notes on the paintings, although in his case for the benefit of his audience, rather than as self-reminders. James Prosek made his reputation through painting fish, but also incorporated nonsense elements in his work by creating imaginary birds in Lear's style, with annotations including alternative names, behavioural notes and the supposed locations of sightings. (Note: His "cockatool" is just like a Lear-painted cockatoo, but its crest consists of Swiss Army knife-like tools. The annotations include "efficient at most simple carpentry jobs". Lear himself created nonsense birds, such as his "Cockatooka Superba", in which the cockatoo is emerging as the flower of a narcissus-like plant.)

A large collection of sketches and studies for Parrots are included in the major Lear art collection held at the Harvard University Houghton Library. In 2018, a copy of Parrots was sold at auction by Bonhams for £90,000, and in 2020 another copy was listed by Christie's with a guide price of £40,000–60,000, and fetched £60,000.

== Selected bibliography ==
- Audubon, John James (1804). The Birds of America. Vol. 1. New York: self published.
- Beechey, Frederick William, ed. (1839). The Zoology of Captain Beechey's Voyage. London: H G Bohn.
- Darwin, Charles (1839). The Voyage of the Beagle. London: Henry Colburn.
- Edwards, George (1743–1751). A Natural History of Uncommon Birds (Part I to IV). Vol. Part I & II. London: Printed for the author at the College of Physicians. Publication dates on title pages: Part I 1743, Part II 1747, Part III 1750, Part IV 1751
- Gessner, Conrad (1551). Historia Animalium Libri (in Latin). Vol. 1. Zurich: C. Froschauer.
- Gould, John (1832). Birds of Europe. Vol. 1. London: self-published.
- Gould, John (1834). A Monograph of the Ramphastidae, or Family of Toucans. London: self-published.
- Lear, Edward (1832). Illustrations of the Family of Psittacidœ, or Parrots. London: self-published.
- Levaillant, François (1804). Histoire Naturelle des Perroquets (in French). Vol. 1. Paris: Levrault, Schoell.
- Willughby, Francis; Ray, John (1676). Ornithologiae Libri Tres (in Latin). London: John Martyn.
- Willughby, Francis; Ray, John (1678). The Ornithology of Francis Willughby of Middleton in the County of Warwick. London: John Martyn.
- Yarrell, William (1843). A History of British Birds. London: John Van Voorst.
