= Cocorobó Area of Relevant Ecological Interest =

Protected area in Bahia, Brazil

- Área de Relevante Interesse Ecológico Cocorobó
- Location within Brazil
- Nearest city: Jeremoabo, Bahia
- Coordinates: 9.831218°S 38.831030°W
- Area: 7,473.45 hectares (18,467.3 acres)
- Designation: Area of relevant ecological interest
- Created: 5 June 1984
- Administrator: Chico Mendes Institute for Biodiversity Conservation

The Cocorobó Area of Relevant Ecological Interest (Portuguese: Área de Relevante Interesse Ecológico Cocorobó) is an area of relevant ecological interest in the state of Bahia, Brazil.

== Location ==
The Cocorobó Area of Relevant Ecological Interest is in the municipality of Jeremoabo, Bahia. It has an area of 7,473.45 hectares (18,467.3 acres). It is in the caatinga biome. The area is just north of highway BR-235. The Riacho do Cipó, a tributary of the Vaza-Barris River, flows through the western half of the area from north to south.

== History ==
The Cocorobó Area of Relevant Ecological Interest was created on 5 June 1984. Its objectives are to maintain a natural ecosystem of regional or local importance and regulate use to conserve nature. The area is administered by the Chico Mendes Institute for Biodiversity Conservation (ICMBio). It became part of the Caatinga Ecological Corridor, created in May 2006.

== Sources ==
- Área de Relevante Interesse Ecológico Cocorobó (in Portuguese), MMA: Ministério do Meio Ambiente, archived from the original on 2013-11-16
- Arie Corobobó (in Portuguese), ICMBio: Chico Mendes Institute for Biodiversity Conservation, archived from the original on 2016-11-04
- Ganem, Roseli Senna (2016), "Gestão integrada da biodiversidade: corredores, mosaicos e reservas da biosfera" (PDF), Conservação da Biodiversidade Legislação e Políticas Públicas (in Portuguese), archived from the original (PDF) on 2016-11-04
