= Glória, Bahia =

Municipality of Bahia, Brazil

Glória Município de Glória
- Municipality
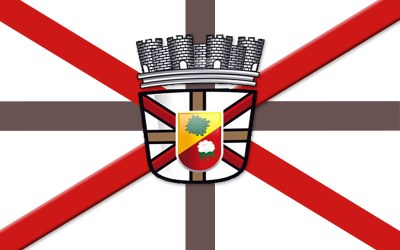
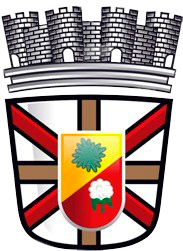
- Flag Coat of arms

- Location of Glória in Bahia

- Location of Glória in Brazil
- Coordinates: 09°20′20″S 38°15′25″W
- Country: Brazil
- Region: Northeast
- State: Bahia
- Founded: May 1, 1886

Government
  - Mayor: Ena Vilma Pereira de Souza Negromonte (PP, 2013-2016)

Area
  - Total: 1,255.56 km^{2} (484.77 sq mi)
- Elevation: 250 m (820 ft)

Population (2020)
  - Total: 15,234
  - Density: 12.133/km^{2} (31.425/sq mi)
- Demonym: Gloriense
- Time zone: UTC−3 (BRT)
- Climate: BSh
- Website: gloria.ba.leg.br

Glória is a municipality in the state of Bahia in the North-East region of Brazil. Glória covers 1,255.56 km^{2} (484.77 mi^{2}), and has a population of 15,234 with a population density of 13 inhabitants per square kilometer. It is located on the border of the states of Bahia, Pernambuco, and Alagoas on the banks of the Moxito River, now a lake as the result of the construction of Moxito Hydroelectric Power Plant.

== Languages ==
The Tuxá language was spoken along the São Francisco River near Glória.

== See also ==
- List of municipalities in Bahia
