= Serra Branca / Raso da Catarina Environmental Protection Area =

The Serra Branca / Raso da Catarina Environmental Protection Area
- Área de Proteção Ambiental Serra Branca / Raso da Catarina
- IUCN category V (protected landscape/seascape)
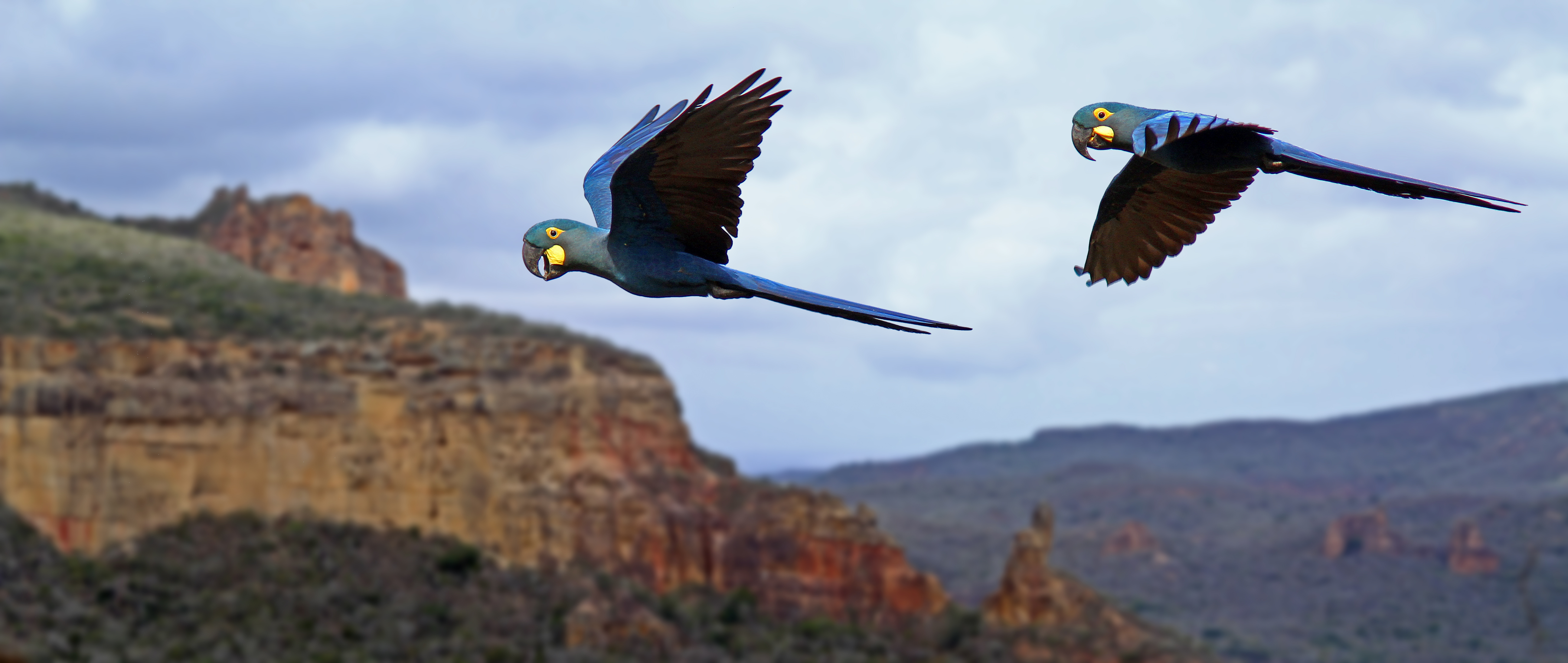
- Lear's macaw in the Raso da Catarina

- Location within Brazil
- Nearest city: Jeremoabo, Bahia
- Coordinates: 9°56′46″S 38°34′26″W
- Area: 67,234 hectares (166,140 acres)
- Designation: Environmental protection area
- Created: 5 June 2001
- Administrator: INEMA: Instituto do Meio Ambiente e Recursos Hídricos (BA)

The Serra Branca / Raso da Catarina Environmental Protection Area (Portuguese: Área de Proteção Ambiental Serra Branca / Raso da Catarina) is an environmental protection area in the state of Bahia, Brazil. Its sandstone cliffs are home to the endangered Lear's macaw.

== Location ==
The Serra Branca / Raso da Catarina Environmental Protection Area is in the municipality of Jeremoabo in the northeast of Bahia. It has an area of 67,234 hectares (166,140 acres) within the large Raso da Catarina region. It is bounded to the south by the Vaza-Barris River and to the north by the federally-administered Raso da Catarina Ecological Station.

== Environment ==
The climate is semi-arid, the driest region of Bahia. Average temperatures are 27 °C (81 °F). Average annual rainfall is about 400 millimetres (16 in), falling unpredictably during a few days in the winter. Although there is a shortage of surface water, which is found only in the valleys of the São Francisco and Vaza-Barris rivers, there may be large underground reserves.

The whole area is covered by caatinga vegetation, consisting of cacti, palm trees, bromeliads and other xerophytic plants. Common species include the umbuzeiro, angico, aroeira, faveleira, catingueira and pau-de-rato. It is home to the Lear's macaw (Anodorhynchus leari), an endangered species that uses the sandstone cliffs of the Serra Branca as a breeding area. The macaws traditionally nest in two areas, the Toca Velha owned by the Fundação Biodiversitas in Canudos and the privately owned Fazenda Serra Branca in the APA. The main food of this bird is the nut of the Syagrus coronata (licuri palm), which grows in the APA.

== History ==
The Serra Branca / Raso da Catarina Environmental Protection Area was created by state decree 7.792 of 5 June 2001. To protect the Lear's Macaw the APA formed an ecological corridor in the caatinga biome with the Raso da Catarina Ecological Reserve, which became the Raso da Catarina Ecological Station in 2001. The APA became part of the Caatinga Ecological Corridor, created in May 2006.

== Sources ==
- APA Serra Branca / Raso da Catarina (in Portuguese), INEMA: Instituto do Meio Ambiente e Recursos Hídricos (BA)
- Ganem, Roseli Senna (2016), "Gestão integrada da biodiversidade: corredores, mosaicos e reservas da biosfera" (PDF), Conservação da Biodiversidade Legislação e Políticas Públicas (in Portuguese), archived from the original (PDF) on 2016-11-04
