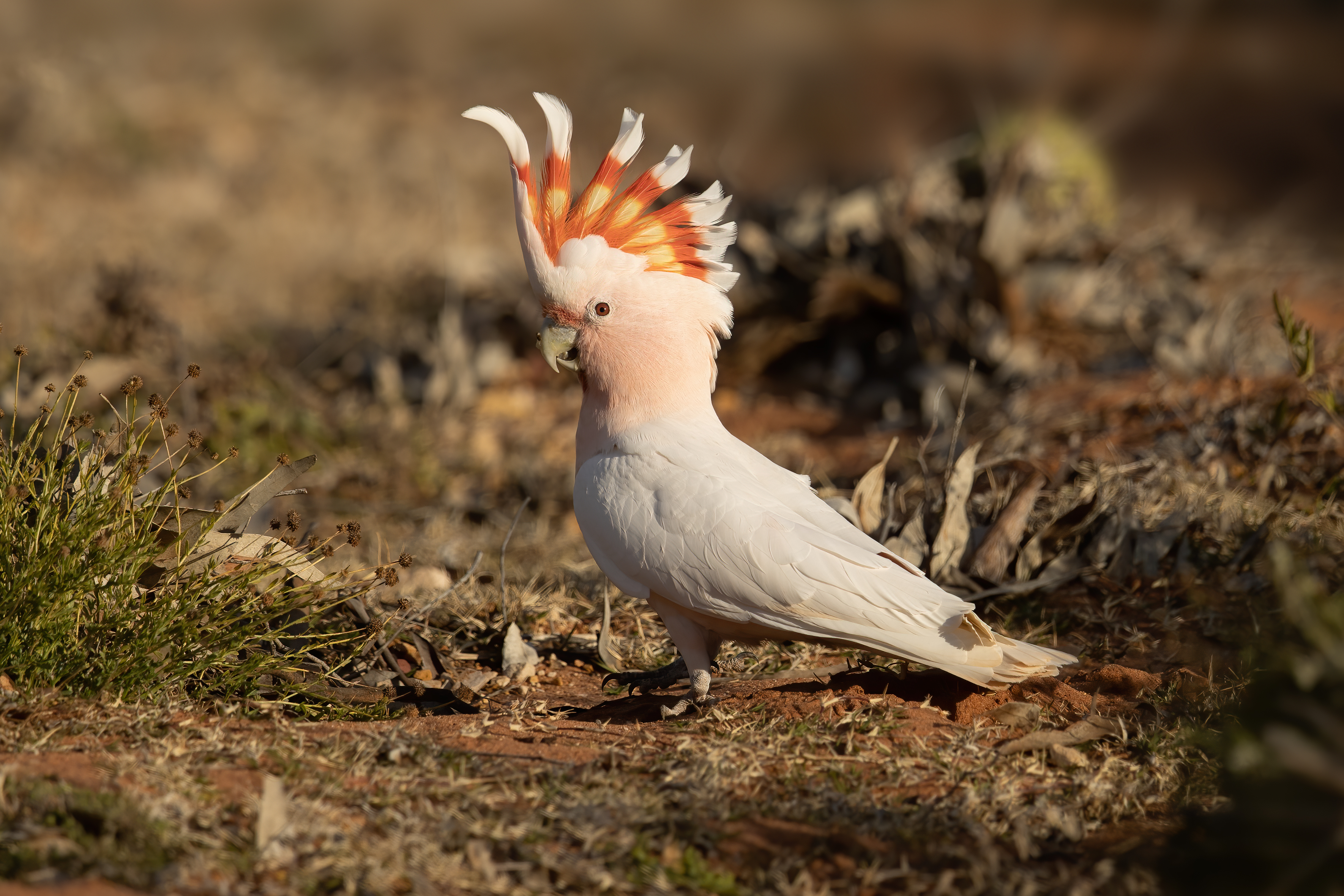
- Pink cockatoo with its crest raised in New South Wales, Australia

Conservation status
- Least Concern (IUCN 3.1)

Scientific classification
- Kingdom: Animalia
- Phylum: Chordata
- Class: Aves
- Order: Psittaciformes
- Family: Cacatuidae
- Genus: Cacatua
- Subgenus: Lophochroa; Bonaparte, 1857
- Species: C. leadbeateri

Binomial name
- Cacatua leadbeateri (Vigors, 1831)

Subspecies
- C. (L.). l. leadbeateri (Vigors, 1831); C. (L.). l. mollis (Mathews, 1912)
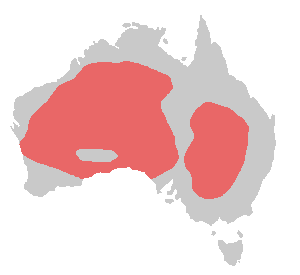
- Pink cockatoo range (in red)

Synonyms
- Plyctolophus leadbeateri Vigors, 1831; Plyctolophus erythropterus Swainson, 1837; Lophochroa leadbeateri

= Pink cockatoo =

Type of cockatoo

The pink cockatoo (Cacatua leadbeateri), previously known as Major Mitchell's cockatoo or Leadbeater's cockatoo, is a medium-sized cockatoo that inhabits arid and semiarid inland areas across Australia, with the exception of the north-east.

== Taxonomy and naming ==
Irish naturalist Nicholas Aylward Vigors described the species in 1831 as Plyctolophus leadbeateri. The scientific name commemorates the London naturalist and taxidermist Benjamin Leadbeater, who had given Vigors what would become the type specimen. Edward Lear painted it in his 1832 work Illustrations of the Family of Psittacidae, or Parrots. Citing Lear, William Swainson gave it the name Plyctolophus erythropterus.

The pink cockatoo is more closely related to Cacatua than is the galah. Its lineage diverged around the time of or shortly after the acquisition of the long crest, probably the former, as this crest type is not found in all Cacatua cockatoos, so must have been present in an early or incipient stage at the time of the divergence of the pink cockatoo's ancestors. Like the galah, this species has not lost the ability to deposit diluted pigment dyes in its body plumage, although it does not produce melanin colouration anymore, resulting in a lighter bird overall compared to the galah. Indeed, disregarding the crest, the pink cockatoo looks almost like a near-leucistic version of that species. Another indication of the early divergence of this species from the "white" cockatoo lineage is the presence of features found otherwise only in corellas, such as its plaintive yodeling cry, as well as others, which are unique to pink and the true white cockatoos, for example the large crest and rounded wing shape.

In 2023, this species was reclassified into the genus Cacatua by the International Ornithological Congress; although it represents a very basally diverging member of the clade. It shares close morphological, behavioural, and vocal features to other members of the Cacatua genus. Due to this, the former genus Lophochroa may be better considered a monotypic subgenus of Cacatua.

Prior to 2023, "Major Mitchell's cockatoo" was designated the official name for this species by the International Ornithologists' Union (IOC). "Pink cockatoo" was its official name (with Major Mitchell as an alternative) in the 1926 official RAOU checklist, and was reinstated as the official name in 2023 following the IOC's taxonomic change. The bird became linked to Major Thomas Mitchell after he described the species in glowing terms in his books on his expeditions, calling it the "cockatoo of the interior". Mitchell himself called it the red-top cockatoo. Before this John Gould had called it Leadbeater's cockatoo (derived from the species name) in 1848, as had Lear in 1832. Gould added that people of the Swan River Colony called it pink cockatoo, and recorded an indigenous name Jak-kul-yak-kul. Other names include desert cockatoo, and chockalott, chock-a-lock, joggle-joggle, and wee juggler, the last anglicised from the Wiradjuri wijugla. In Central Australia south of Alice Springs, the Pitjantjatjara term is kakalyalya. Names recorded from South Australia include kukkalulla (Kokatha dialect of Western Desert language), nkuna and ungkuna (Arrernte), yangkunnu (Barngarla), and yangwina (Wirangu), and yel-le-lek (from the Wimmera), and cal-drin-ga (from the lower Murray).

BirdLife Australia officially renamed Major Mitchell's cockatoo back to "pink cockatoo" in 2023, due to Mitchell's involvement in the massacre of Aboriginal people at Mount Dispersion and a general trend to make species names more culturally inclusive.

== Description ==
The pink cockatoo has a soft-textured white and salmon-pink plumage and large, bright red and yellow crest. Its former name referenced Major Thomas Mitchell, who wrote, "Few birds more enliven the monotonous hues of the Australian forest than this beautiful species whose pink-coloured wings and flowing crest might have embellished the air of a more voluptuous region." Pink cockatoo females and males are almost identical. The males are usually bigger. The female has a broader yellow stripe on the crest and develops a red eye when mature.

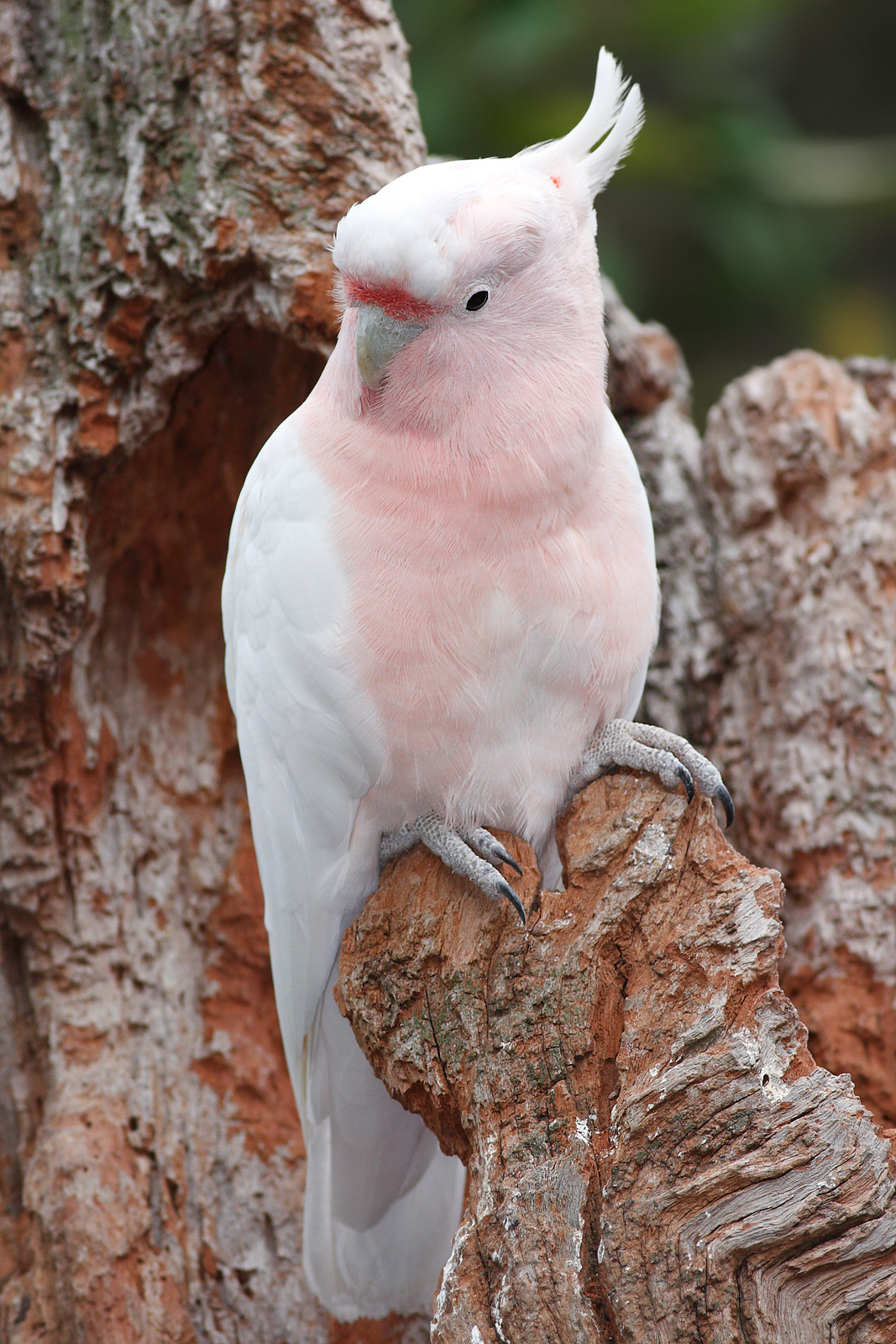
Adult perched on a tree in Melbourne Zoo

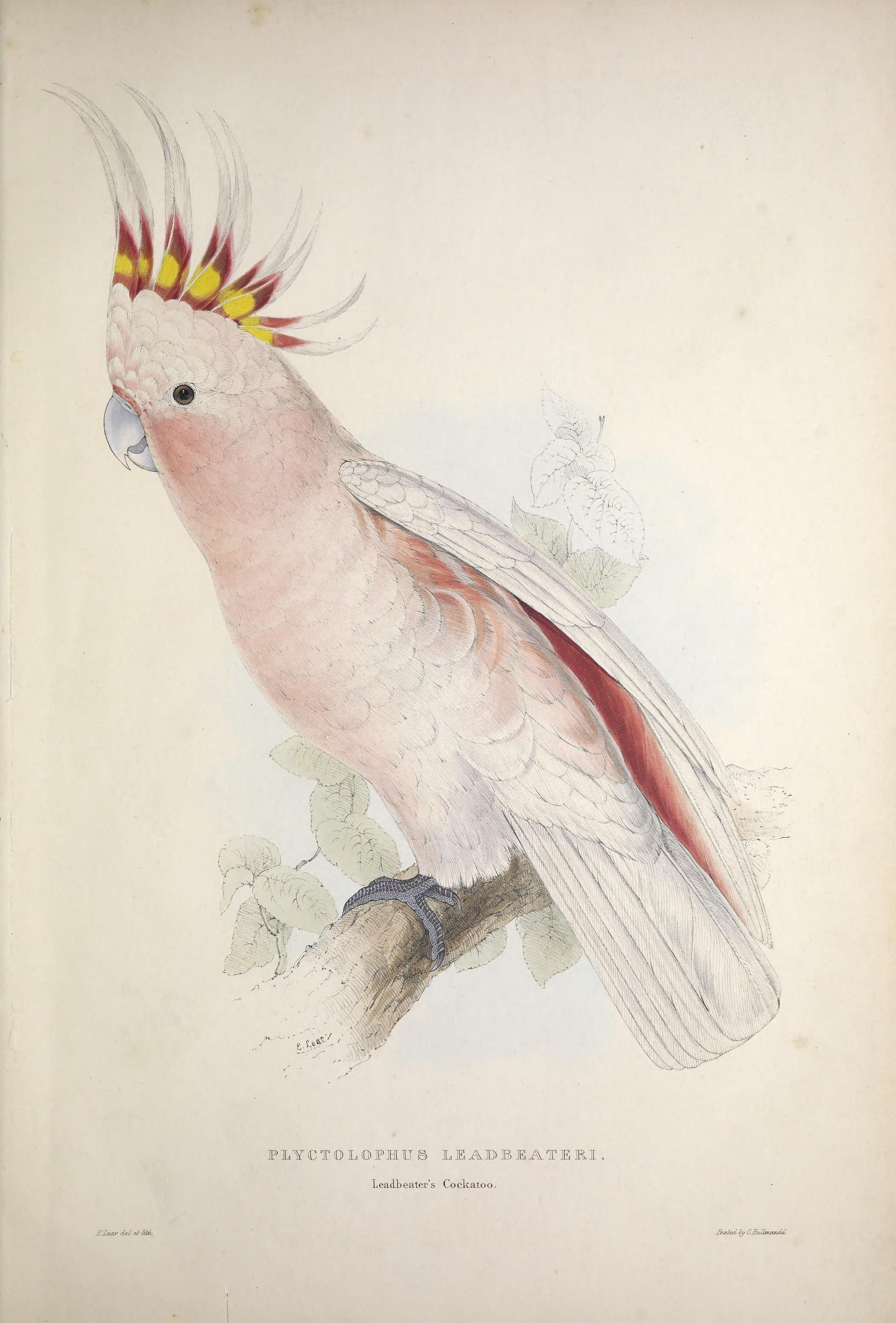
"Plyctolophus leadbeateri, Leadbeater's Cockatoo" in Lear's influential 1832 monograph

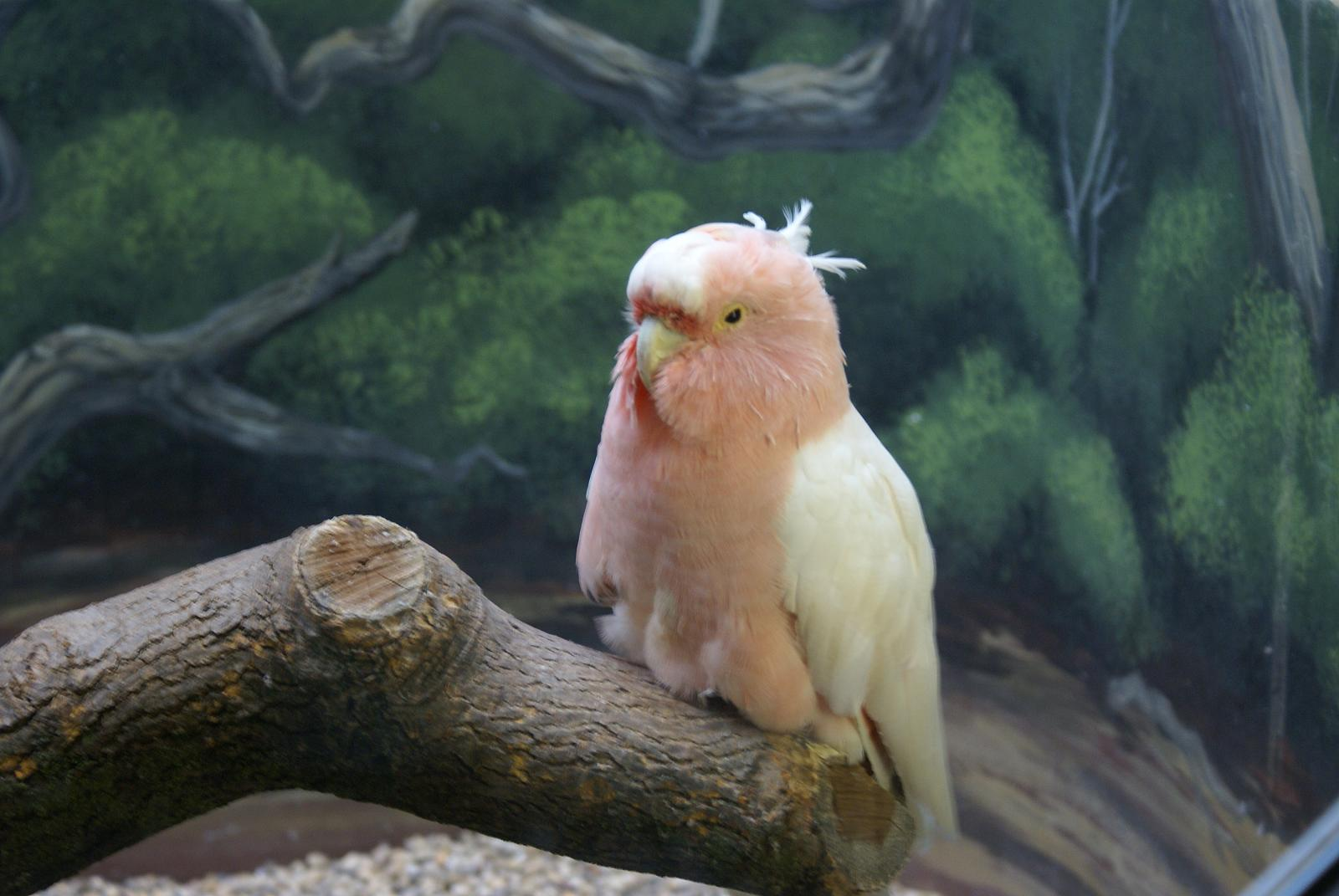
Cookie, a cockatoo that lived to be 83 years old, housed in the Brookfield Zoo

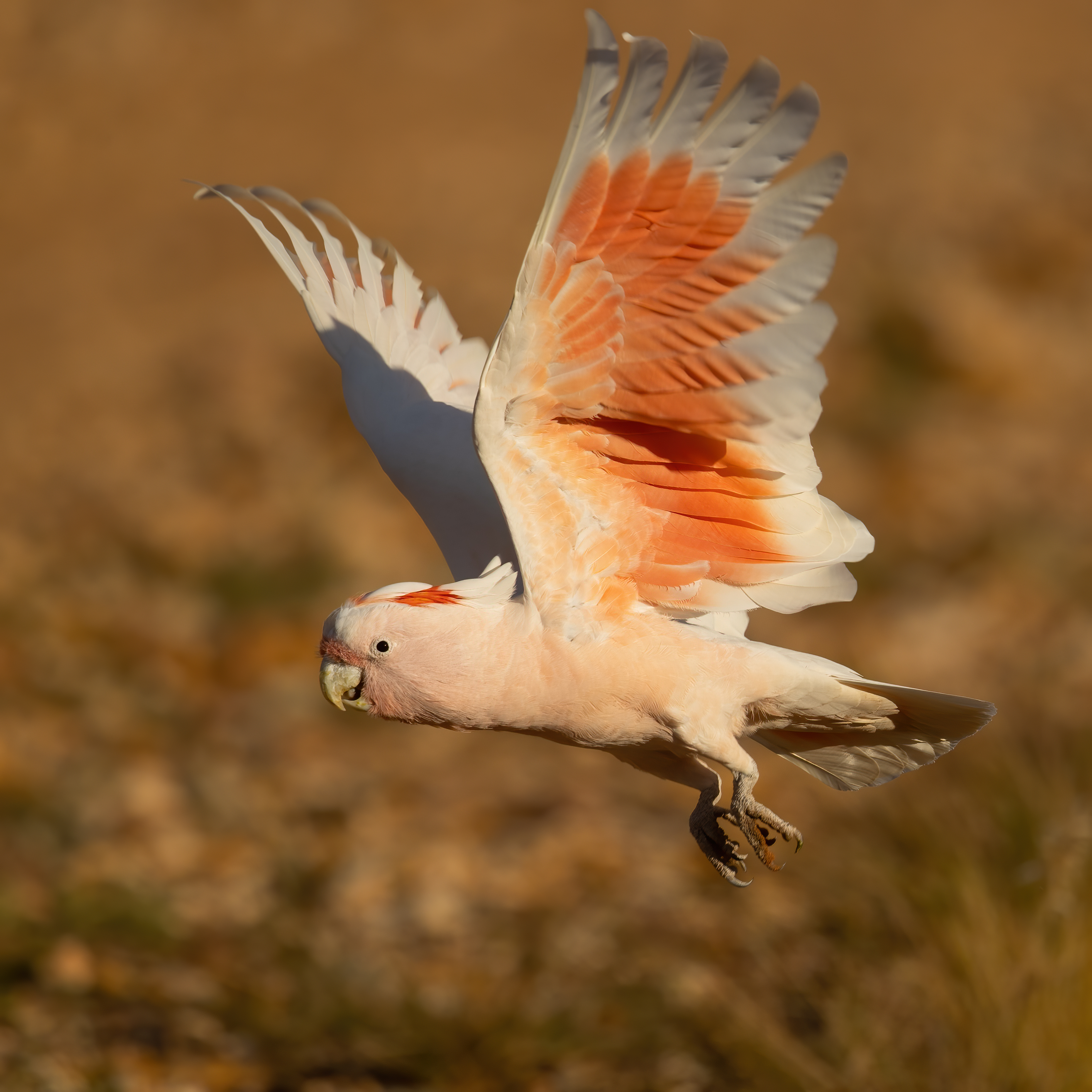
In flight

=== Reproduction and lifespan ===
The bird reaches sexual maturity around 3–4 years old. The oldest recorded pink cockatoo died at 83 years old.

== Distribution and habitat ==
In contrast to those of the galah, populations of pink cockatoos have declined rather than increased as a result of man-made changes to the arid interior of Australia. Where galahs readily occupy cleared and part-cleared land, pink cockatoos require extensive woodlands, particularly favouring conifers (Callitris spp.), sheoak (Allocasuarina spp.) and eucalypts. Unlike other cockatoos, pink cockatoo pairs will not nest close to one another, so they cannot tolerate fragmented, partly cleared habitats, and their range is contracting.

In the Mallee region of Victoria where the galah and pink cockatoo can be found to be nesting in the same area, the two species have interbred and produced hybridised offspring occasionally.

The pink cockatoo is usually found in pairs or small groups, and feeds both on the ground and in trees.

== Conservation status ==
=== Australia ===
The pink cockatoo is listed as endangered under the Environment Protection and Biodiversity Conservation Act 1999.

=== Victoria ===
- The pink cockatoo is listed as a threatened species on the Victorian Flora and Fauna Guarantee Act (1988). Under this Act, an Action Statement for the recovery and future management of this species has been prepared.
- On the 2013 advisory list of threatened vertebrate fauna in Victoria, this species is listed as vulnerable.

== Aviculture ==
"Cookie" was a pink cockatoo and a beloved resident of Illinois' Brookfield Zoo near Chicago from the time the zoo opened in 1934 until his death on 27 August 2016. Cookie was 83 years old and he had been retired from public display since 2009 due to ill health prior to his death.
