= Raso da Catarina Ecological Station =

- Estação Ecológica Raso da Catarina
- IUCN category Ia (strict nature reserve)
- Location within Brazil
- Nearest city: Paulo Afonso
- Coordinates: 9°45′47″S 38°31′26″W
- Area: 105,282 hectares (260,160 acres)
- Designation: Ecological station
- Created: 11 October 2001

Raso da Catarina Ecological Station (Portuguese: Estação Ecológica Raso da Catarina) is a strictly protected ecological station in the state of Bahia in Brazil. It lies in the Raso da Catarina ecoregion of the Caatinga biome.

== Location ==
The ecological station in the Caatinga biome, which covers 104,842 hectares (259,070 acres), was created on 11 October 2001. It is administered by the Chico Mendes Institute for Biodiversity Conservation. The reserve is classified as International Union for Conservation of Nature (IUCN) category Ia (strict nature reserve). The reserve covers parts of the municipalities of Rodelas, Paulo Afonso and Jeremoabo in Bahia. It is bounded to the south by the 67,234 hectares (166,140 acres) Serra Branca / Raso da Catarina Environmental Protection Area, created in 2001. It became part of the Caatinga Ecological Corridor, created in May 2006.

== Purpose ==
The purpose is to conserve nature and support scientific research. Specifically the purpose is to conserve the endemic and/or endangered species Lear's macaw (Anodorhynchus leari), three-banded armadillo (Tolypeutes tricinctus), white-browed guan (Penelope jacucaca), yellow-faced siskin (Spinus yaerrellii), pectoral antwren (Herpsilochmus pectoralis) and cougar (Puma concolor greeni).

== Sources ==
- APA Serra Branca / Raso da Catarina (in Portuguese), INEMA: Instituto do Meio Ambiente e Recursos Hídricos (BA), 20 September 2011
- Esec Raso da Catarina (in Portuguese), Chico Mendes Institute for Biodiversity Conservation, archived from the original on 2014-06-10
- Ganem, Roseli Senna (2016), "Gestão integrada da biodiversidade: corredores, mosaicos e reservas da biosfera" (PDF), Conservação da Biodiversidade Legislação e Políticas Públicas (in Portuguese), archived from the original (PDF) on 2016-11-04
- Unidade de Conservação: Estação Ecológica Raso da Catarina (in Portuguese), MMA: Ministério do Meio Ambiente
