= Macururé =

Municipality of Bahia, Brazil

Coordinates: 9°10′S 39°04′W

- Municipality
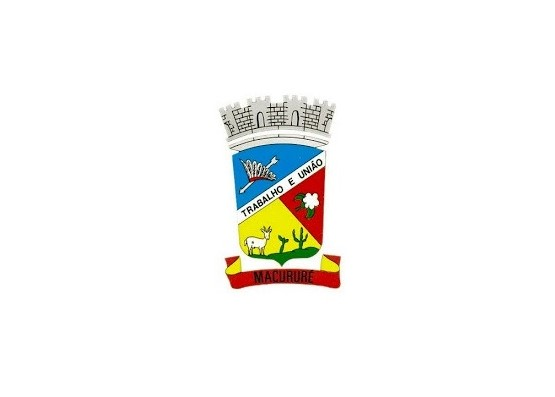
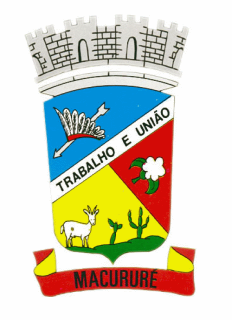
- Flag Coat of arms
- Interactive map of Macururé
- Country: Brazil
- Region: Nordeste
- State: Bahia

Population (2020)
  - Total: 7,787
- Time zone: UTC−3 (BRT)

Macururé is a municipality in the state of Bahia in the North-East region of Brazil.

The municipality contains part of the Raso da Catarina ecoregion.

== See also ==
- List of municipalities in Bahia
