= Cookie (cockatoo) =

Oldest known Major Mitchell's cockatoo

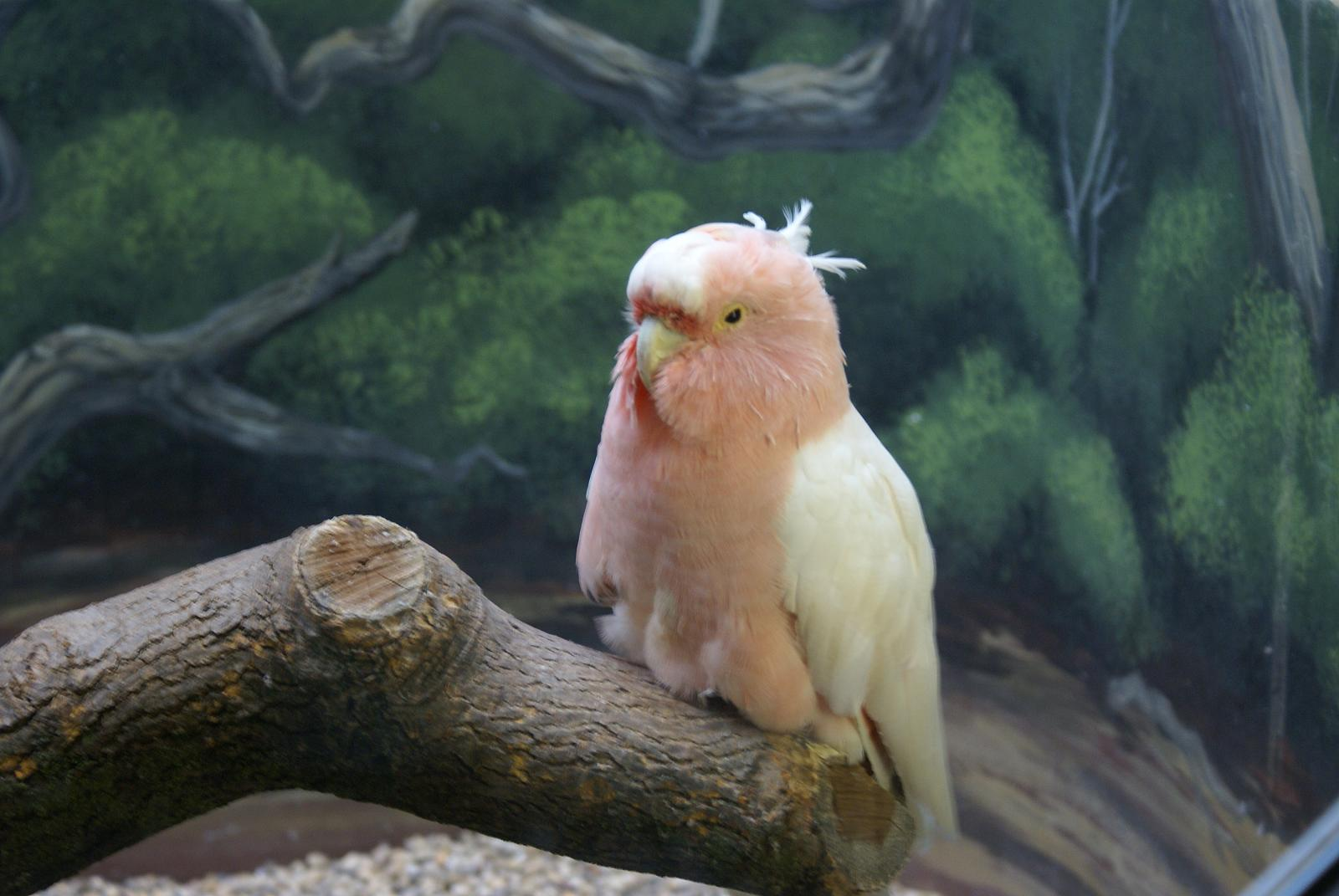
- Cookie in 2008
- Species: Pink cockatoo (Cacatua leadbeateri)
- Sex: Male
- Hatched: June 30, 1933; Taronga Zoo; Sydney, New South Wales, Australia
- Died: August 27, 2016 (aged 83); Brookfield Zoo, Illinois, U.S.
- Known for: Oldest cockatoo in captivity, former oldest living parrot
- Owner: Brookfield Zoo

Cookie (June 30, 1933 – August 27, 2016) was a male pink cockatoo (also known as Major Mitchell's cockatoo) residing at Brookfield Zoo, near Chicago, Illinois, United States. He was believed to be the oldest member of his species alive in captivity, at the age of 82 in June 2015, having significantly exceeded the average lifespan for his kind. He was one of the longest-lived birds on record and was recognised by the Guinness World Records as the oldest living parrot in the world.

The next-oldest pink cockatoo to be found in a zoological setting was a 31-year-old female bird located at Paradise Wildlife Sanctuary, England. Information published by the World Parrot Trust states longevity for Cookie's species in captivity is on average 40–60 years.

== Life ==
Cookie was Brookfield Zoo's oldest resident and the last surviving member of the animal collection from the time of the zoo's opening in 1934, having arrived from Taronga Zoo of Sydney, New South Wales, Australia, in the same year and judged to be one year old at the time.

In the 1950s an attempt was made to introduce Cookie to a female pink cockatoo, but Cookie rejected her as "she was not nice to him".

In 2007, Cookie was diagnosed with, and placed on medication and nutritional supplements for, osteoarthritis and osteoporosis – medical conditions which occur commonly in aging animals and humans alike, although it is believed that the latter may also have been brought on as a result of being fed a seed-only diet for the first 40 years of his life, in the years before the dietary requirements of his species were fully understood.

Cookie was "retired" from exhibition at the zoo in 2009 (following a few months of weekend-only appearances) in order to preserve his health, after it was noticed by staff that his appetite, demeanor and stress levels improved markedly when not on public display. He was moved to a permanent residence in the keepers' office of the zoo's Perching Bird House, although he made occasional appearances for special events, such as his birthday celebration, which was held each June. In 2013, he was still considered to be in good health for his age.

Cookie died on August 27, 2016, at 83 years of age. A memorial at the zoo was unveiled in September 2017.

In 2020, Cookie became the subject of a poetry collection by Barbara Gregorich entitled Cookie the Cockatoo: Everything Changes.

== See also ==
- List of individual birds
