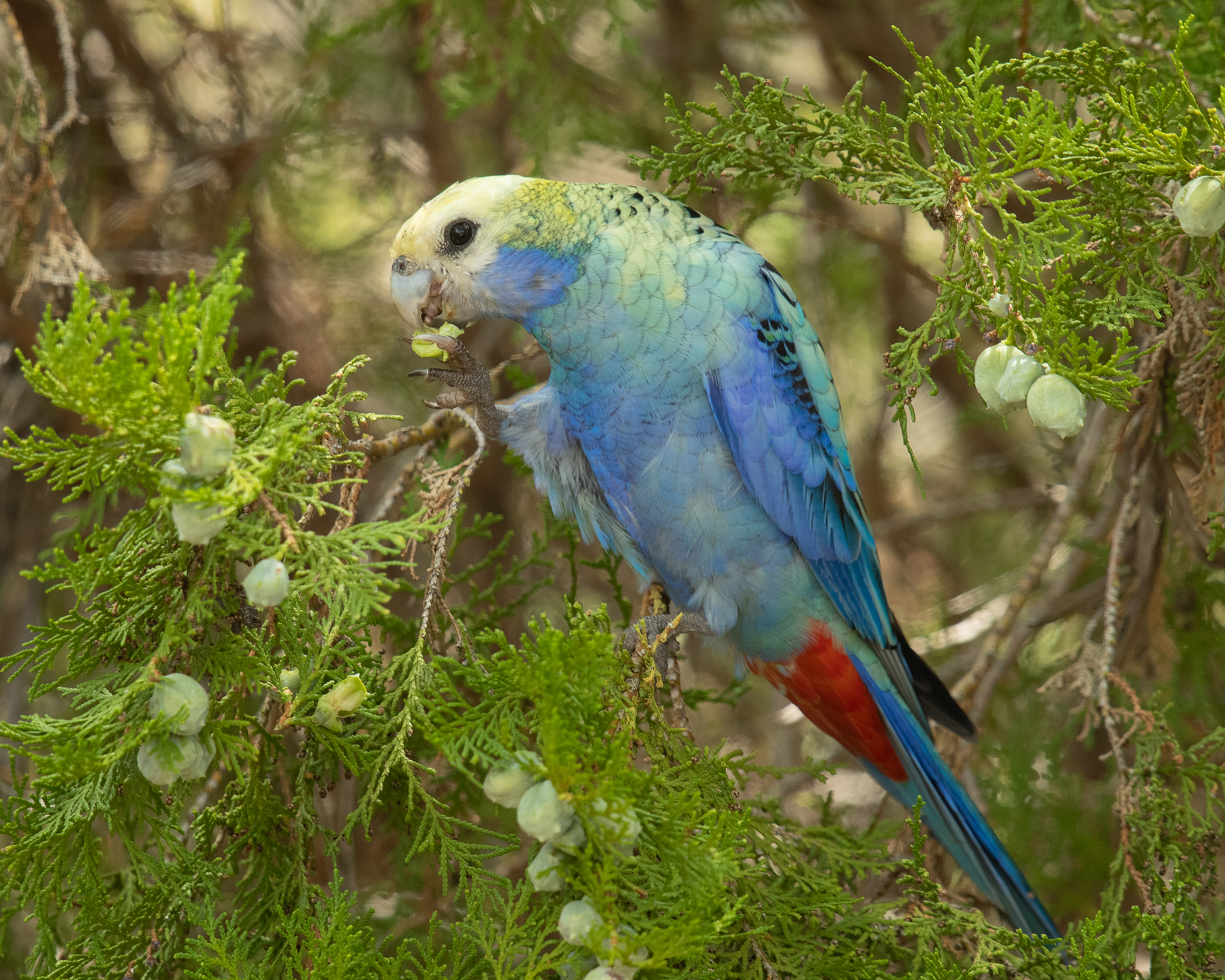
- Pale-headed rosella

Conservation status
- Least Concern (IUCN 3.1)

Scientific classification
- Kingdom: Animalia
- Phylum: Chordata
- Class: Aves
- Order: Psittaciformes
- Family: Psittaculidae
- Genus: Platycercus
- Species: P. adscitus

Binomial name
- Platycercus adscitus (Latham, 1790)
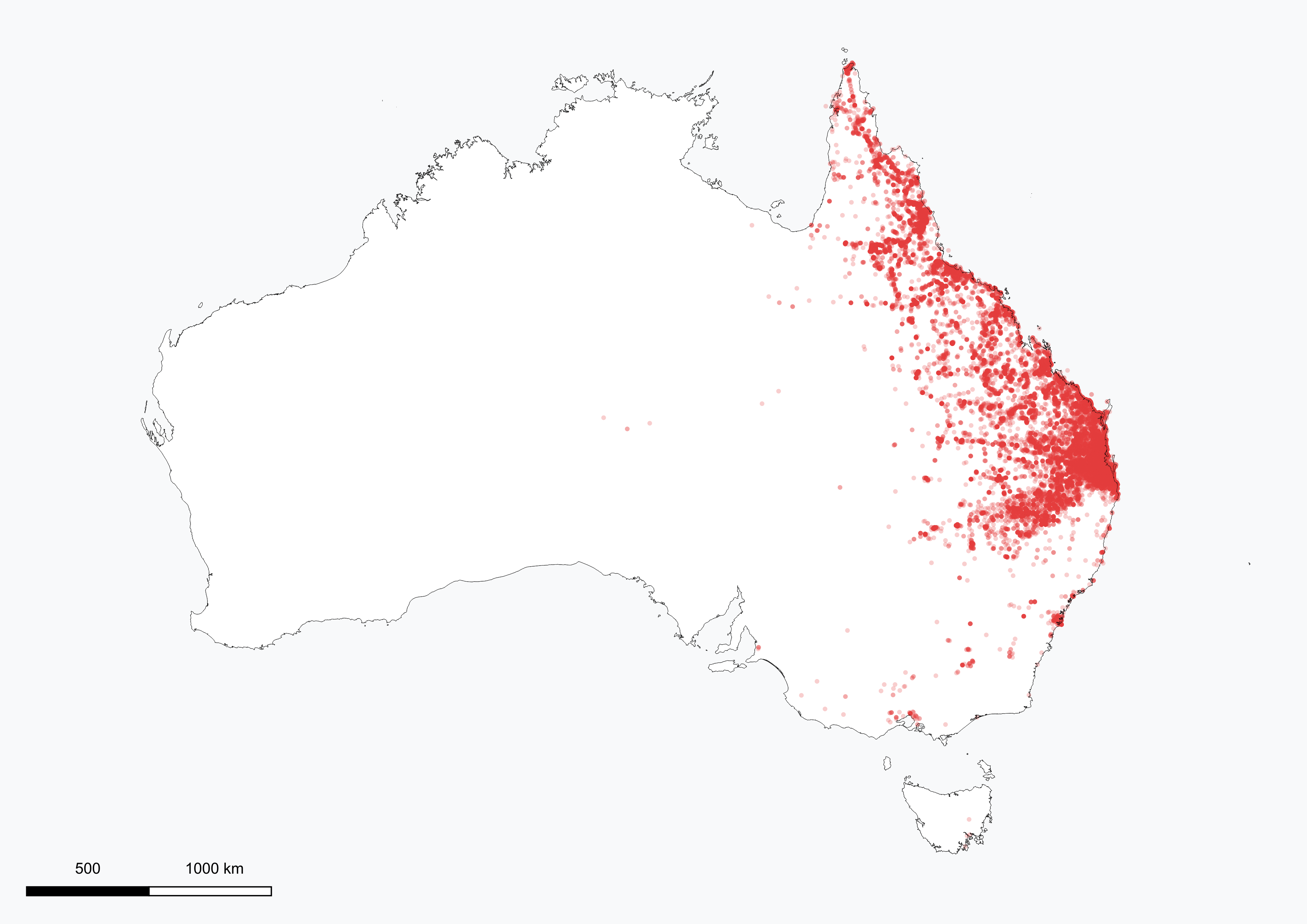
- Species distribution

= Pale-headed rosella =

Species of bird

The pale-headed rosella (Platycercus adscitus), is a broad-tailed parrot of the genus Platycercus native to northeastern Australia. It is a moderate-size parrot with a pale yellow head, predominantly white cheeks, scalloped black and gold back and pale blue underparts. Two subspecies are recognised, although some authorities consider it to be conspecific with the eastern rosella of southeastern Australia.

Found in open woodland, it feeds on seeds and fruit. As with other rosellas, the pale-headed rosella nests in hollows of large trees. It readily adapts to aviculture and is sold as a cagebird.

== Taxonomy ==
The pale-headed rosella was formally described in 1790 by the English ornithologist John Latham and given the binomial name Psittacus adscitus. The specific epithet is from Latin asciscere meaning "to approve". Latham did not specify a locality but in 1912 Gregory Mathews designated the locality as Cooktown, Queensland in northeast Australia. The pale-headed rosella is now placed in the genus Platycercus that was introduced in 1925 by Nicholas Aylward Vigors.

There are two subspecies, the nominate adscitus (Cape York Peninsula) and the better known palliceps (eastern Queensland), known as the blue-cheeked rosella, that was depicted in 1832 by the English artist Edward Lear in his Illustrations of the Family of Psittacidae, or Parrots. Its closest relative was thought to be the eastern rosella, which replaces it in southeastern Australia. Hybrids of the two taxa have been recorded where their ranges meet in northeastern New South Wales and southeastern Queensland. However, a 2017 mitochondrial study found that the closest relative was in fact the northern rosella, and that the eastern rosella was an earlier offshoot.

Other common names occasionally seen include mealy rosella, Moreton Bay rosella, blue rosella, and blue-cheeked rosella for the northern subspecies. The term white-cheeked rosella has been used for a species or superspecies combining the pale-headed and eastern forms.

== Description ==
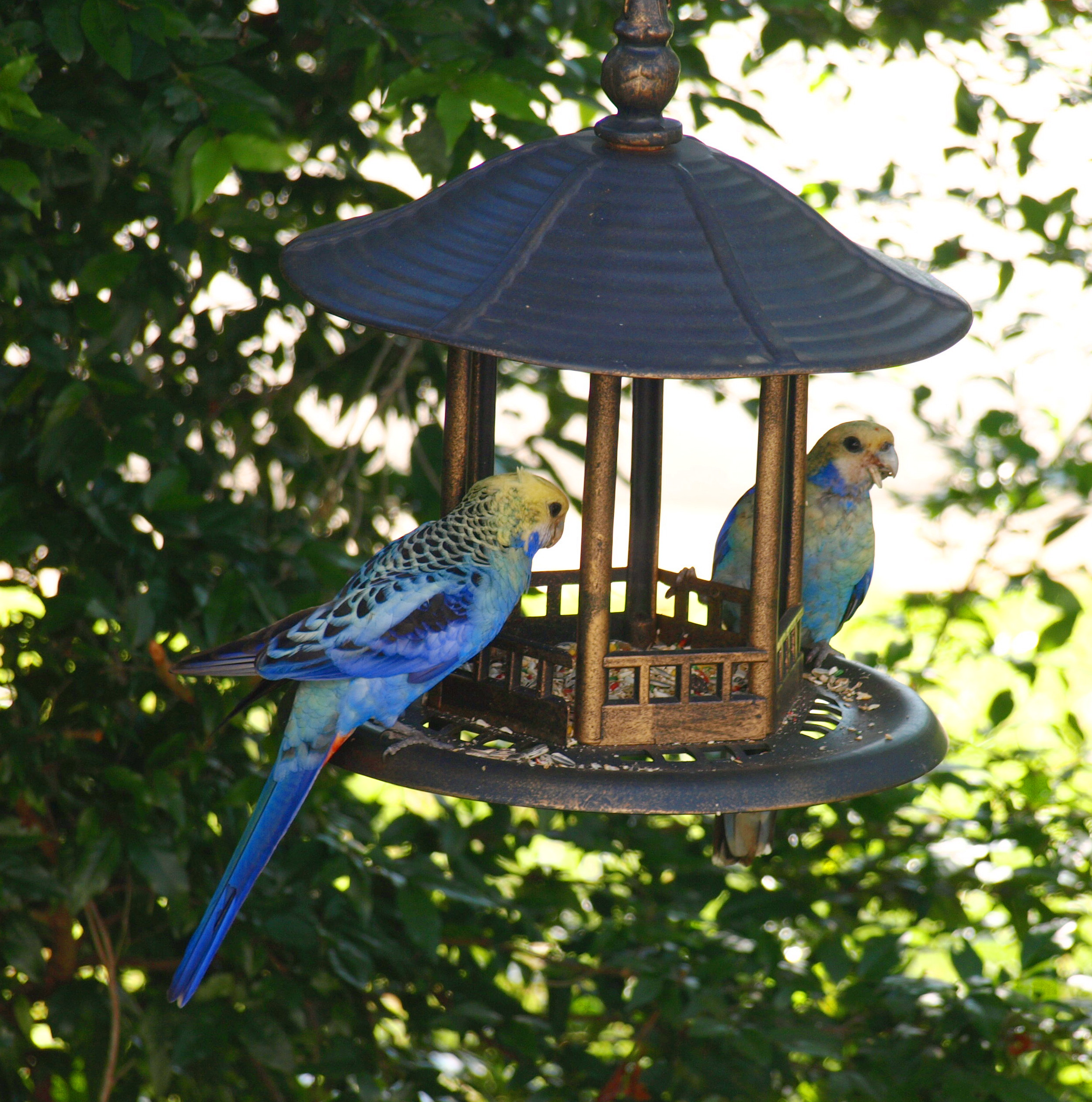
In Atherton Tablelands, Australia

The pale-headed rosella is 33 cm (13 in) long, which includes the 15 cm length of its tail. Its underparts are pale blue, and upper breast and head are pale cream-yellow, the tail which is blue-black and green and the vent which is blood red. The feathers of the nape, scapulars and back are black edged with bright yellow, giving rise to a scalloped appearance. In these margins of the northern race, the yellow is paler with a pale blue tinge. The cheeks are wholly white in the southern subspecies, and partly flushed with blue in the lowerparts in the northern subspecies. The bill is pale blue-white and the legs dark grey. The eyes are yellow-brown. The sexes are similar in appearance, although the female is slightly smaller and duller.

== Distribution and habitat ==
The nominate subspecies adscitus is found from the Cape York Peninsula south through to Cardwell in central-northern Queensland. There is a broad range of intermediate forms, while the southern subspecies palliceps extends from Townsville and points inland south into northeastern New South Wales to the vicinity of the Clarence River. It is common throughout its range. Its preferred habitat is open forest, but has adapted well to human modification of the rural landscape and may even become a pest to orchards and cereal crops. Watering troughs help the species in the dryer western limits of its range.

It was also introduced to Hawaii in 1877, but had died out there by the late 1920s.

== Feeding ==
In Dayboro, SE Queensland

It eats grass and tree seeds and fruits, including river red-gum (Eucalyptus camaldulensis), river she-oak (Casuarina cunninghamiana), snow-in-summer (Melaleuca linariifolia) and other melaleucas, and rough cockleburr (Xanthium strumarium). Birds are partial to the introduced Scotch thistle (Onopordum acanthium).

== Breeding ==
The breeding season varies according to region, with southern birds nesting from September to December and northern ones later from February to June. One brood is laid. The nesting site is usually a hollow over 1 m (3 ft) deep in a tree trunk anywhere up to 30 m (100 ft) above the ground. Although even found to nest in a tree trunk hollow under ground. A clutch of five or six (although up to nine have been recorded) round, white and slightly shiny eggs, measuring 26 x 22 mm, is laid.

== Aviculture ==
The species is relatively hardy and easy to keep in cultivation. It can be aggressive and so is recommended to be segregated from other birds in captivity.
