= Tuxá language =

Extinct unclassified language of Brazil

Tuxá
- Rodela
- Native to: Brazil
- Region: Bahia, Pernambuco
- Ethnicity: Tuxá
- Extinct: c. 1860s
- Language family: Language isolate

Language codes
- ISO 639-3: tud
- Glottolog: tuxa1239
- Linguasphere: 89-BAA-aa
- Map of Rodelas, where Tuxá was spoken

Tuxá (Tusha; also Rodela) was the language of the Tuxá people, who now speak Portuguese and Dzubukuá.

== History ==
Carlos Estêvão, the director of the Museu Paraense Emílio Goeldi in Pará, had collected 14 words of the Tuxá language from Antônio Likaro and Cordorina, two Tuxá caboclos in Rodelas. These were later published by Thomaz Pompeu Sobrinho in 1958.

An old pajé (shaman), aged around 90 in 1961, was unable to remember anything of the language which he had used as a child, his mind having been clouded by age and excessive drinking of cachaça. According to Antônio Cirilo dos Santos, a Tuxá man living in Cabrobó, Pernambuco, the language had not been spoken for nearly 100 years by 1961. He remembered that his father had known a few words. Nevertheless, about 30 words could be collected from two women, Maria Dias dos Santos and Maria Inácia Tuxá dos Santos, who had been "excluded" from the tribe and then lived in Juazeiro, Bahia.

== Vocabulary ==
=== Pompeu (1958) ===
Tushá vocabulary collected by Estêvão:

Portuguese gloss (original)	English gloss (translated)	Tushá
sol	sun	enkê
lua	moon	jerõmêkê
céu	sky	eisrêmêkê
terra	earth	jerintin
Rio São Francisco	São Francisco River	Kaleshí
homem	man	junkurun
mulher	woman	lãkãtí
menino	boy	jití
menina	girl	kaití
cabelo	hair	tixí
dente	tooth	takaí
orelha	ear	kramákê
cachimbo	smoking pipe	tôrú
teiú	Tupinambis lizard	tishiriú

=== Meader (1978) ===
In 1961, Wilbur Pickering recorded the following word list in Juazeiro, Bahia from Maria Dias dos Santos. She was in her late fifties as of 1961, and was born in Rodelas, but later moved to Juazeiro.

Portuguese gloss (original)	English gloss (translated)	Tuxá
água	water	ˈmiˈaŋga
cabeça	head	kaˈka
cabelo	hair	kakaˈi
cachorro	dog	kašuˈi
carne	meat	oˈtiši
criança (menino)	child (boy)	guřituˈi
fogo	fire	toˈe
fumo	smoke	paˈka
muitas	many	kalatuˈi
muitas cabeças	many heads	kalatuˈi kaˈka
ovelha	sheep	alvɛˈmą
panela	pan	ˈmunduřu
sol	sun	šaˈřola
pessoa suja	dirty person	ˈšuvaˈd̯ya
acangatara	acangatara (type of ceremonial feather headband)	ˈgoxo
cachaça	cachaça	auˈřiŋka
cachimbo	smoking pipe	maˈlaku
chocalho	rattle	mařaˈka
deus	God	tumˈpą
dinheiro	money	kaːmˈba
farinha	flour	koˈñuna
gado	cattle	gadiˈma
melancia	watermelon	ˈvɛřdoˈa
negro	black	tupiˈʌŋka
peba	six-banded armadillo	kabulɛˈtɛ
porco	pig	ˈmokoˈxɛ
preá	Brazilian guinea pig	šuˈřį
soldado	soldier	sokoˈdo
tatu	armadillo	putiˈa
trempe	trivet	mᴜsˈtřᴜ̨
urubu	vulture	uˈřikuˈři tutuˈa (?)
quem gosta de apreciar o Guarani	who likes to enjoy the Guarani	kalamaˈši kalatuˈi kaˈlamototuˈa
