= Benjamin Leadbeater =

British naturalist and ornithologist (1773-1851)

- Born: Benjamin Leadbeater; 12 January 1773
- Died: 21 March 1851 (aged 78)

Benjamin Leadbeater (12 January 1773 – 22 March 1851) was a British naturalist, ornithologist and taxidermist.

Benjamin Leadbeater was a renowned merchant of natural history materials in London, England. His shop was located at 19 Brewer Street, Piccadilly. Leadbeater employed many naturalists around the world and supplied specimens to museums. By 1824, his business was known as "Leadbetter & Son" and, by 1838, it was called "John Leadbetter". Around 1858, the business had returned to the name "Leadbetter & Son".

Several species are named in his honour, including the southern ground-hornbill (Bucorvus leadbeateri), Major Mitchell's cockatoo (Cacatua leadbeateri) and violet-fronted brilliant (Heliodoxa leadbeateri). He described Lady Amherst's pheasant, Chrysolophus amherstiae, in 1829.
