= Jeremoabo =

Municipality of Bahia, Brazil

- Municipality
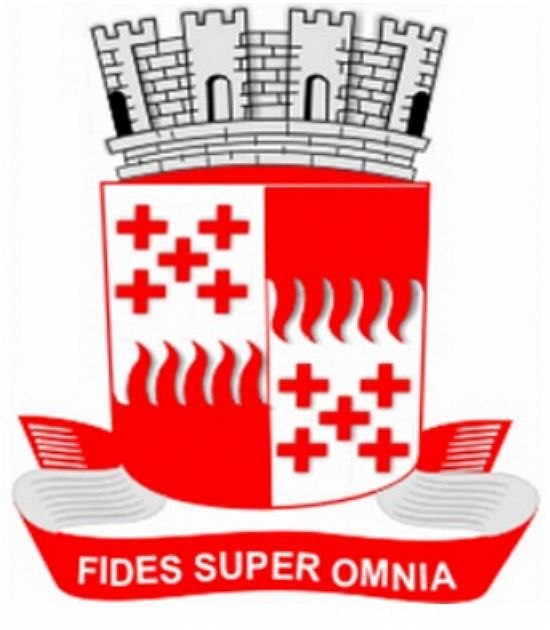
- Flag Coat of arms
- Nickname: Jeré
- Location in Bahia

- Location in Brazil
- Coordinates: 10°4′1″S 38°21′00″W
- Country: Brazil
- Region: Nordeste
- State: Bahia
- Mesoregion: Northeast of Bahia
- Microregion: Jeremoabo
- Settled: ~1625
- Founded (as village): 25 October 1831
- Incorporated (municipality): 6 July 1925

Government
  - Mayor: Anabel de Sá Lima

Area
  - Total: 1,797.795 sq mi (4,656.267 km^{2})
- Elevation: 892 ft (272 m)

Population (2020)
  - Total: 40,651
- Time zone: UTC−3 ( BRT)
- CEP postal code: 48540-000
- Area code: 75
- HDI (2010): 0,547
- Website: jeremoabo.ba.gov.br

Jeremoabo is a municipality in the state of Bahia in the North-East region of Brazil.

The municipality contains part of the Raso da Catarina ecoregion. The municipality contains the 7,473-hectare (18,470-acre) Cocorobó Area of Relevant Ecological Interest, created in 1984. The municipality contains part of the 104,842-hectare (259,070-acre) Raso da Catarina Ecological Station, created in 2001. To the south of the ecological station it contains the 67,234-hectare (166,140-acre) Serra Branca / Raso da Catarina Environmental Protection Area, also created in 2001.

== Notable people ==
- Jemerson (footballer)

== See also ==
- List of municipalities in Bahia
