= Rodelas =

Municipality in Bahia, Brazil

Coordinates: 8°50′S 38°46′W

- Municipality
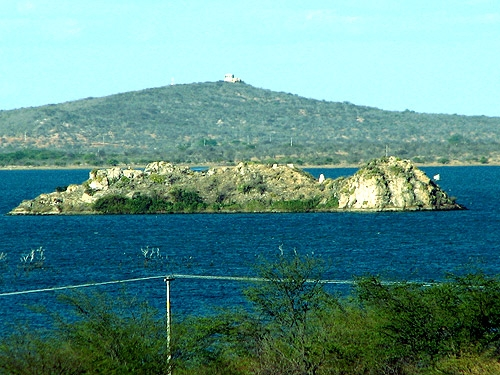

- Flag Coat of arms

- Location in Bahia
- Country: Brazil
- Region: Nordeste
- State: Bahia

Population (2020)
  - Total: 9,442
- Time zone: UTC−3 (BRT)

Rodelas is a municipality in the state of Bahia in the North-East region of Brazil.

== Geography ==
The municipality contains part of the 104,842 hectares (259,070 acres) Raso da Catarina Ecological Station, created in 2001. The municipality was designated a priority area for conservation and sustainable use when the Caatinga Ecological Corridor was created in 2006.

== History ==
The extinct Tuxá language was spoken in Rodelas.

== See also ==
- List of municipalities in Bahia
