= Santa Brígida, Bahia =

Coordinates: 9°44′S 38°08′W

- Municipality
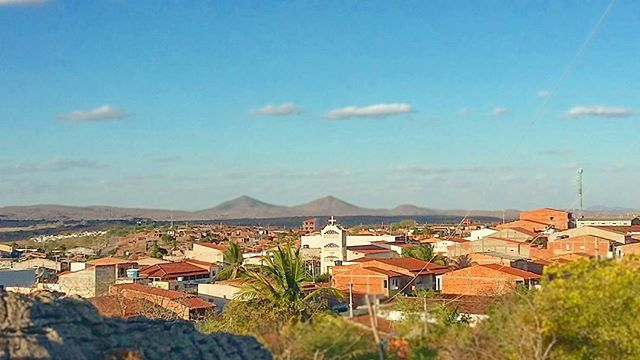
- View of Santa Brígida, Bahia

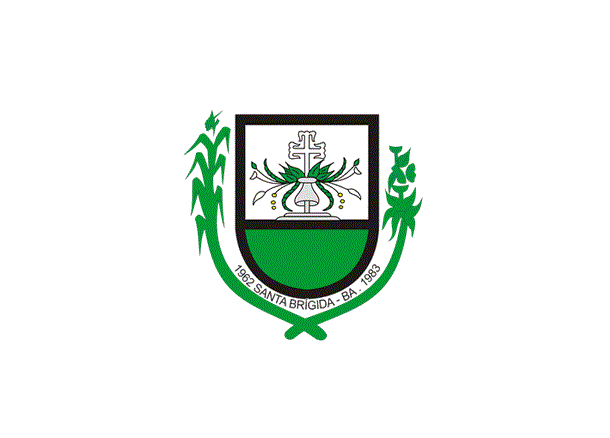
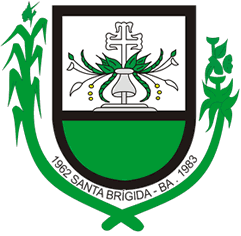
- Flag Coat of arms
- Interactive map of Santa Brígida, Bahia
- Country: Brazil
- Region: Nordeste
- State: Bahia

Population (2020)
  - Total: 14,063
- Time zone: UTC−3 (BRT)

Santa Brígida, Bahia is a municipality in the state of Bahia in the North-East region of Brazil.

== See also ==
- List of municipalities in Bahia
