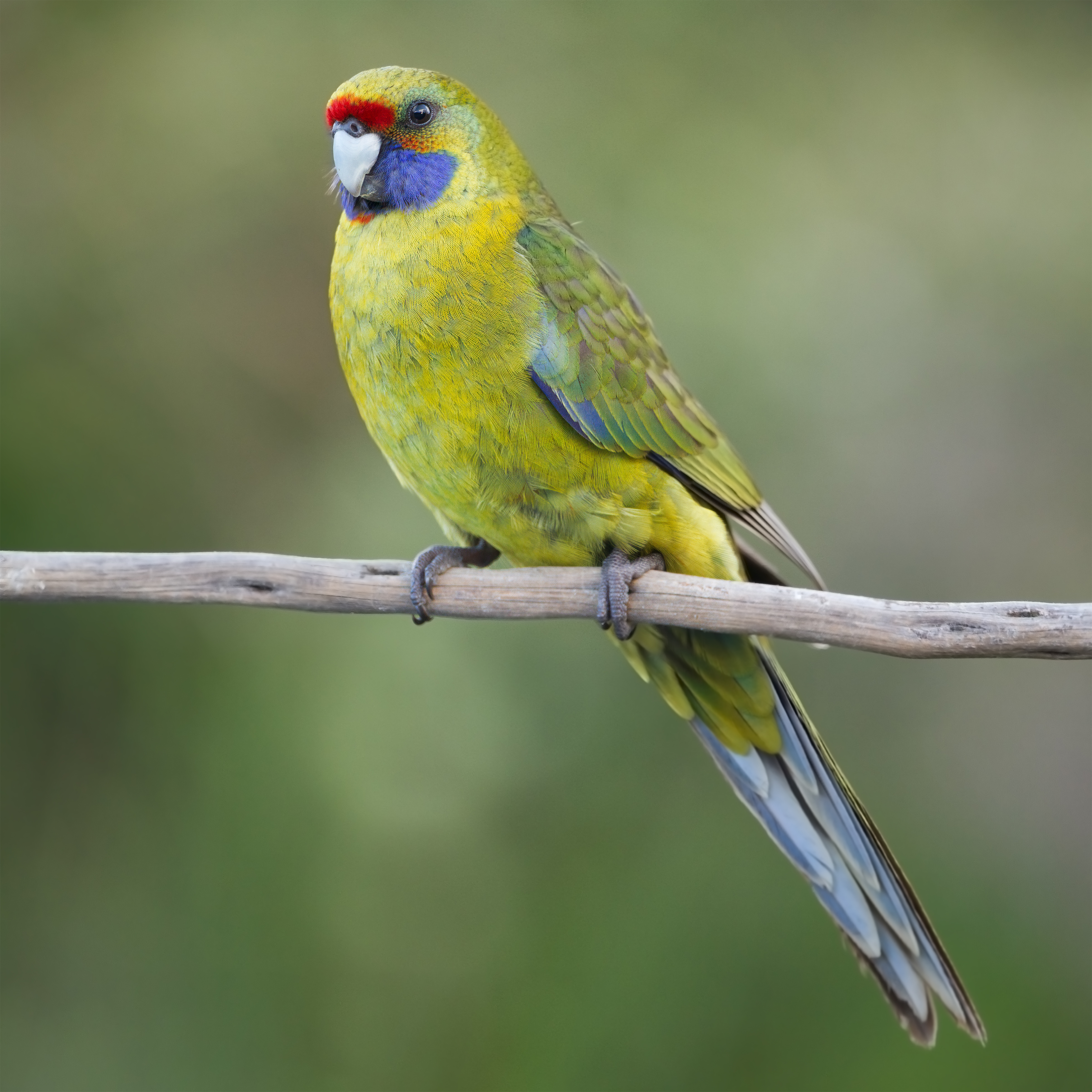

Conservation status
- Least Concern (IUCN 3.1)

Scientific classification
- Kingdom: Animalia
- Phylum: Chordata
- Class: Aves
- Order: Psittaciformes
- Family: Psittaculidae
- Genus: Platycercus
- Species: P. caledonicus

Binomial name
- Platycercus caledonicus (Gmelin, 1788)
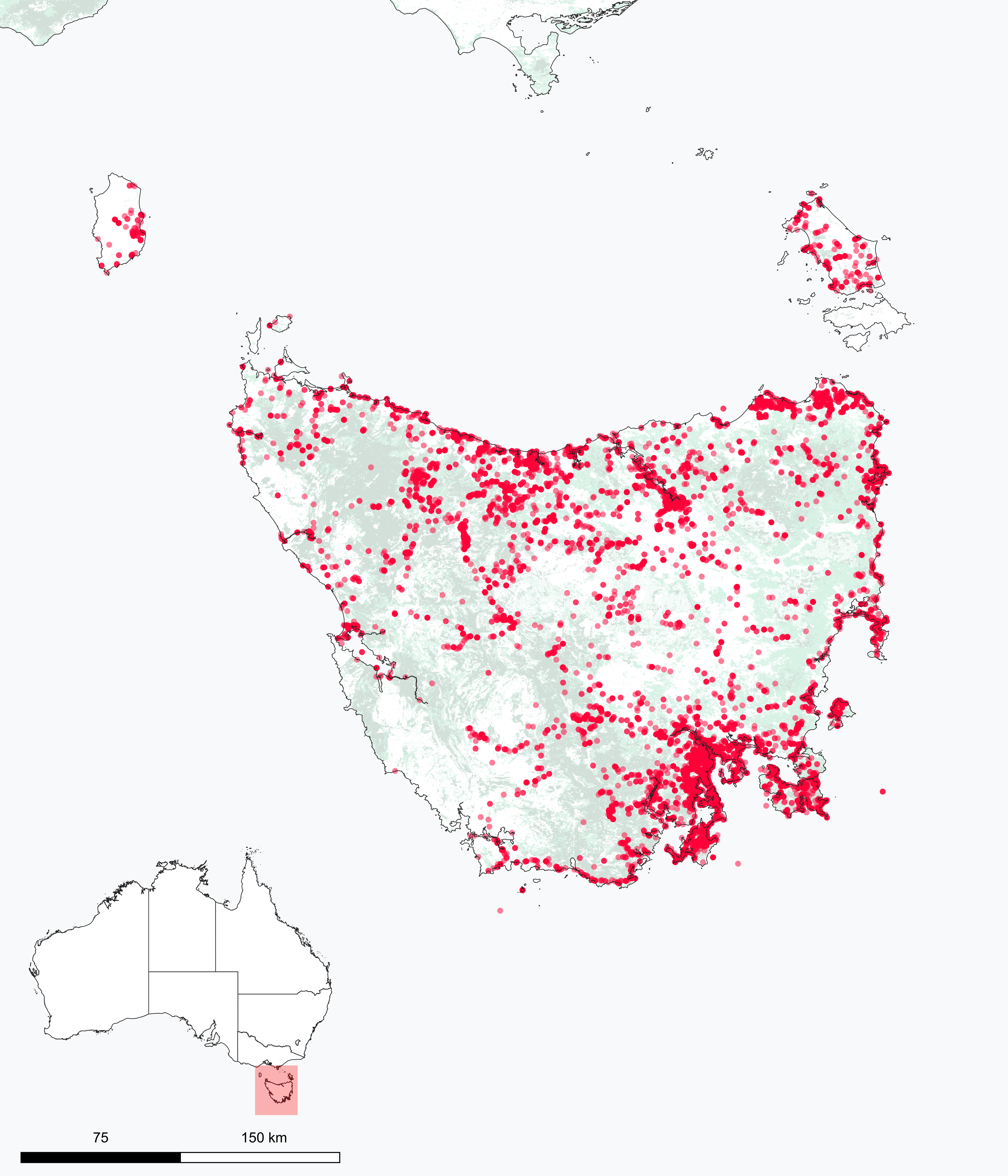
- Range in Tasmania

Synonyms
- Psittacus caledonicus Gmelin, 1788; Psittacus brownii Kuhl, 1820; Psittacus flaviventris Temminck, 1821; Platycercus xanthogaster Stephens, 1826

= Green rosella =

Species of parrot native to Tasmania and the Bass Strait Islands

The green rosella or Tasmanian rosella (Platycercus caledonicus) is a species of parrot native to Tasmania and Bass Strait islands. It was described by the German naturalist Johann Friedrich Gmelin in 1788, and named on the mistaken assumption it came from New Caledonia. At 14.5 in (37 cm) long it is the largest species of the rosella genus, Platycercus. Two subspecies are recognised. The green rosella's underparts, neck and head are yellow, with a red band above the beak and violet-blue cheeks. The back is mostly black and green, and its long tail blue and green. The sexes have similar plumage, except the female has duller yellow plumage and more prominent red markings, as well as a smaller beak. Juvenile and immature birds have predominantly green plumage.

Found in a wide range of habitats with some form of tree cover, the green rosella is predominantly herbivorous, consuming seeds, berries, nuts and fruit, as well as flowers, but may also eat insect larvae and insects such as psyllids. Nesting takes place in tree hollows. Common and widespread across Tasmania, the green rosella is rated as least concern on the International Union for Conservation of Nature (IUCN)'s Red List of Endangered species. The King Island subspecies has been classed as vulnerable as its population has declined after much of its habitat on King Island was cleared.

== Taxonomy ==
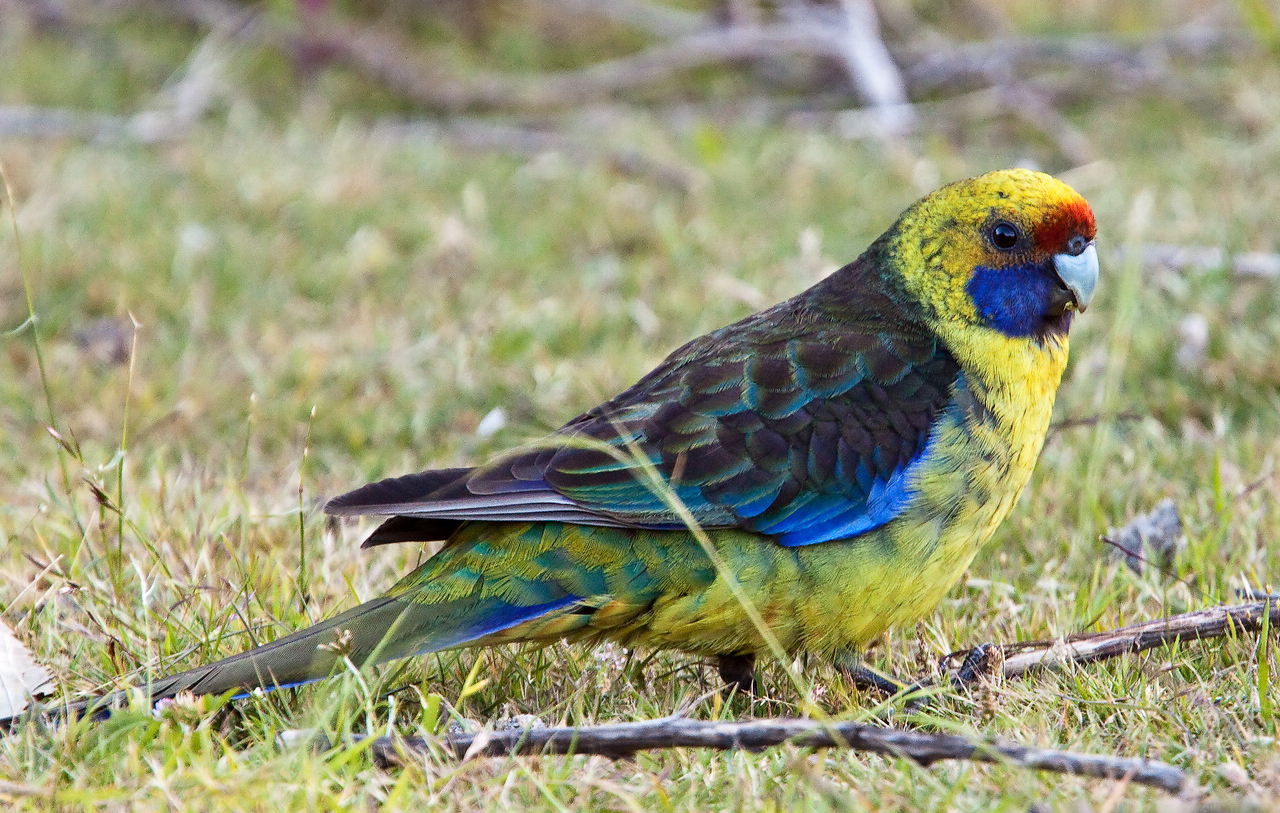
Male in Tasmania

A green rosella specimen was collected in Adventure Bay, Tasmania, by ship's surgeon William Anderson on the third voyage of James Cook between 26 and 30 January 1777. Cook wrote of seeing "yellowish paroquets" in the woods there. Anderson collected many bird specimens while tasked as the expedition's naturalist, although he died of tuberculosis in 1778 before the return home. Many collection localities were incorrect, and notes were lost or pieced together many years later. The specimen, along with many others, ended up in the collection of British naturalist Sir Joseph Banks. English naturalist John Latham saw it there and wrote about the green rosella in his 1780s work A General Synopsis of Birds. He called it the Caledonian parrot as he assumed (incorrectly) it came from New Caledonia. He even suspected it might be the female of the horned parakeet, which he also saw in Banks' collection. Latham did not give them binomial names, however. It was left to German naturalist Johann Friedrich Gmelin to describe the species, which he did as Psittacus caledonicus in the 13th edition of Systema Naturae in 1788.

In 1820, German naturalist Heinrich Kuhl described a specimen that Robert Brown had collected from northwestern King Island on 23 April 1802 during Matthew Flinders' circumnavigation of Australia, naming it Psittacus brownii in honour of its collector. He based it on the description of la Perruche à large queue, "the long-tailed parrot" by French naturalist François Levaillant in his 1805 work Histoire Naturelle des Perroquets. Kuhl's name also took priority over Dutch zoologist Coenraad Jacob Temminck's published name of Psittacus flavigaster, which was published in 1822.

Irish zoologist Nicholas Aylward Vigors established the genus Platycercus in 1825, based on the distinctive architecture of the feathers in the tail and wing, including P. flavigaster and P. brownii within it. English naturalist James Francis Stephens named it Platycercus xanthogaster in 1826, though there was no need for a new binomial name. Australian amateur ornithologist Gregory Mathews noted that the name Platycercus flaviventris was commonly used in the 19th century, but highlighted the priority of both P. brownii and P. caledonicus over this, positing the last as the most senior name. He believed the specimens used for P. brownii had come from Derwent in Tasmania.

Mathews did feel the King Island form was distinctive, being larger and having more red in the plumage than Tasmanian populations and so described it as P. c. henriettae in 1915. This has since been reclassified as a synonym of P. c. brownii as its status has been recognized as distinct from the Tasmanian mainland taxon—now known as P. c. caledonicus. Mathews also described P. c. flindersi from Flinders Island in 1917, on the basis of darker plumage. It is now considered as not distinct from the Tasmanian mainland subspecies.

"Green rosella" has been designated the official name by the International Ornithological Committee (IOC). Alternative common names include Tasmanian rosella, yellow-breasted parakeet and mountain parrot. English zoologist John Gould called it the yellow-bellied parakeet, and early Tasmanian settlers knew it as the hill parrot.

One of six species of rosella in the genus Platycercus, the green rosella and related crimson rosella make up a "blue-cheeked" lineage. A 1987 genetic study on mitochondrial DNA found that the green rosella was basal to the other blue-cheeked forms, with the north Queensland population of the crimson rosella (P. elegans nigrescens) divergent from other subspecies of crimson rosella. In 2015, Ashlee Shipham and colleagues published a molecular study based on nuclear DNA finding that the North Queensland crimson rosella diverged earlier than the green rosella. They also estimated that the green rosella had diverged from the main crimson rosella lineage around 0.5 million years ago.

== Description ==
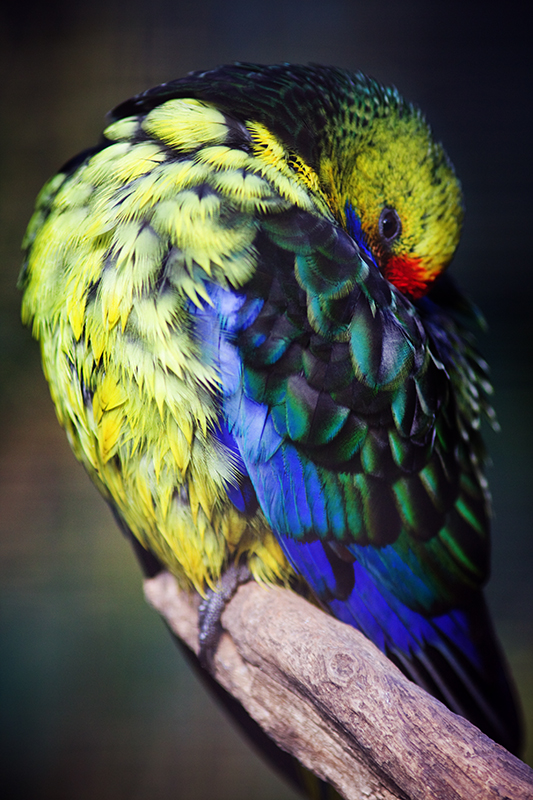
Adult preening, showing dark feather bases

The green rosella is the largest member of the rosella genus. Measuring from 29 to 36 cm (11 to 14 in) in length, an adult has long narrow wings with a wingspan of 44–54 cm (17–21 in), and a long tail with twelve feathers, the central two of which are wider. The adult male is heavier, averaging around 150 g (5.3 oz) to the female's 120 g (4.2 oz), and has a larger bill.

The adult green rosella has a yellow head and underparts with blue cheeks and red band on the forehead and upper lores. The yellow feathers of the forecrown, lower lores, cheeks, chest and thighs can have red markings, while the yellow feathers of the sides and rear of the head and neck, and the underparts have dark brown bases. The edges of the feathers on the underparts can be pale brown, resulting in a faint scalloping, which disappears with wear. Some of the yellow feathers of the nape have white bases and when worn, the bird can have a whitish patch on their nape. The yellow of the back of the head merges indistinctly into the dark plumage of the hindneck, mantle and back, which is black or dark brown with green margins. The feathers of the shoulders are blackish with yellow tips. These margins and tips are often worn by the finish of breeding season, leaving the plumage more solid black. The blue-violet feathers of the chin, throat and cheeks have brown-black bases. The blackish plumage of the back extends to the rump, and the long tail is dark green with brown shafts and dark blue outer feathers and tips. The wings are mostly black and green, with violet-blue marginal coverts, primary coverts, and alula, and blue-tinted dark brown primaries and outer secondaries. Underneath the feathers of the wings are dark brown with blue-violet tips. The iris is brown with a dark grey orbital ring, and the bill is pale-grey, with a dark grey cere. The legs are grey. The yellow plumage of the female is duller and more likely marked with red than that of the male, and the green edges to the black plumage of the upperparts are more prominent.

Young birds leaving the nest have juvenile plumage in their first year of life. Juveniles have a dark green head and neck, upperparts and underparts. The feathers all have dark brown bases. The wings are predominantly dark brown and black with a blue sheen. The wings and tail are shorter than those of adult birds. The bill may have a buff sheen. They have an under-wing stripe, which is not present in the adults. Moulting generally takes place between January and April for birds of all ages. Juvenile birds then adopt immature plumage, which is similar but with patches of yellow feathers on the underparts of adult plumage as well as some adult-coloured wing feathers. Some green juvenile feathers remain until the bird is in its second year of age, though are very worn by this time.

== Distribution and habitat ==
Found across Tasmania and Bass Strait islands, the green rosella is one of the commonest birds encountered. It also occurs on offshore islands such as Maria, Bruny, De Witt and Maatsuyker Islands. Its movements have not been much studied. Although possibly locally nomadic in places, the green rosella is sedentary; even birds at higher altitudes do not migrate. It has become rare on King Island, due to land clearing and possibly competition with the introduced common starling (Sturnus vulgaris) for nesting sites. During breeding season there it is restricted to the Pegarah forest, though may venture elsewhere at other times.

It lives in most habitats with some form of tree cover up to 1500 m (5000 ft) above sea level. These include temperate Southern beech rainforest (where it generally keeps to the canopy), wet and dry sclerophyll forest, woodland, Melaleuca shrubland, coastal heath, dwarf alpine conifer forest, sedgeland, buttongrass moors, tussock grassland, as well as fields, orchards and urban parks and gardens.

== Behaviour ==
Green rosellas are generally encountered in pairs or small groups, though young birds may gather in groups of 20 or more outside the breeding season. They sometimes share the company of eastern rosellas. They fly in a straight line, making rapid shallow wingbeats and gliding briefly in between.

The green rosella has a repeated two-syllable contact call, which has been written as kussik kussik or cossack cossack and is heard in flight. When perched, it utters a rising kwik-kweek kwik-kweek contact call. Birds also make a chattering call during courtship. They can screech shrilly when alarmed.

=== Breeding ===
The green rosella generally breeds at two years of age, though younger birds may pair up and look for nests. The breeding season is September to January, with one brood. The nesting site is usually a hollow over 1 m (3 ft) deep in a tree trunk anywhere up to 30 m (100 ft) above the ground. The tree chosen is generally a eucalypt such as Tasmanian bluegum, manna gum or mountain ash (E. regnans), or myrtle beech. Chimneys, holes in walls and even the vertical pipes of tennis court fences have been used. Green rosellas nested in a wall cavity at Port Arthur convict prison site in 1958 and 2009.

Laying takes place in September and October. A clutch of four or five white and slightly shiny eggs, measuring 30 x 24 mm, is laid. The incubation period has been recorded as anywhere from 19 to 23 days, with the female performing this duty alone. Newly hatched chicks are covered with long white down, and are largely helpless (nidicolous). They leave the nest four to five weeks after hatching and join up with other young birds in flocks, though rely on their parents for food for another fortnight after fledging.

=== Feeding ===
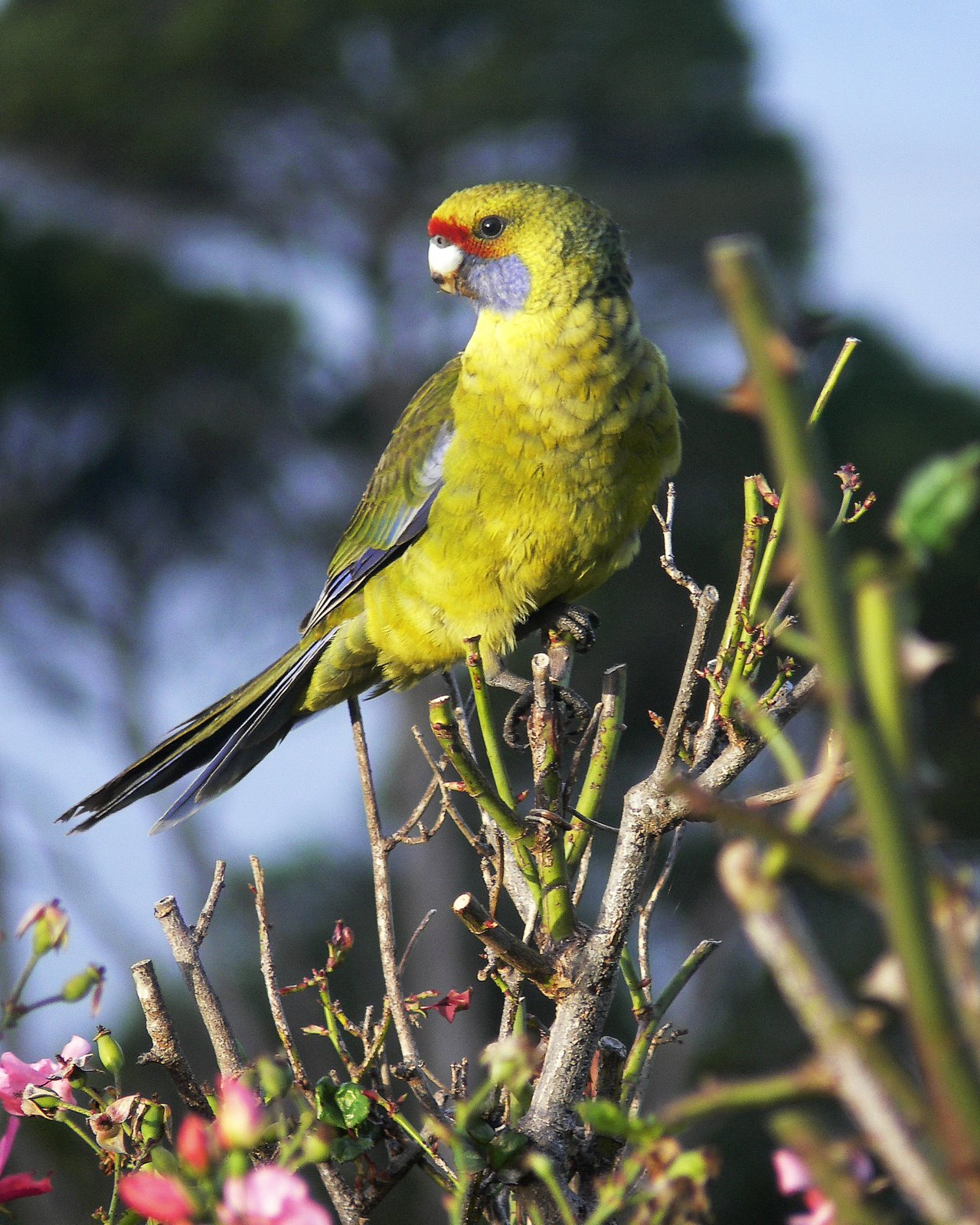
Juvenile in Tasmania. It is greener than an adult.

The green rosella is predominantly herbivorous, with the seeds of grasses and trees—especially eucalypts—forming the bulk of its diet; other items eaten include the seed of the soft tree fern (Dicksonia antarctica), cranberry heath (Astroloma humifusum), myrtle beech (Lophozonia cunninghamii), Australian blackwood (Acacia melanoxylon), silver wattle (Acacia dealbata) and buttercups (Ranunculus), berries, nuts and fruit, as well as flowers and new buds of southern sassafras (Atherosperma moschatum), mānuka (Leptospermum scoparium), shining tea-tree (Leptospermum nitidum), swamp honey-myrtle (Melaleuca squamea), Tasmanian bluegum (Eucalyptus globulus), Smithton peppermint (Eucalyptus nitida), messmate stringybark (Eucalyptus obliqua), snow gum (Eucalyptus pauciflora), manna gum (Eucalyptus viminalis), small-fruit hakea (Hakea microcarpa) and native plum (Cenarrhenes nitida). The green rosella has at times partaken of the berries of the common hawthorn (Crataegus monogyna), as well as Coprosma and Cyathodes, and even leaf buds of the common osier (Salix viminalis). It may eat insect larvae and insects such as psyllids of the genus Schedotrioza, which they extract from leaf galls on the black peppermint (Eucalyptus amygdalina).

Green rosellas generally forage in the canopy or understory of forested areas, or in hedges, shrubs and trees in more open areas. They come to the ground to eat fallen fruit or spilt grain in orchards or farmland. They keep quiet while on the ground, and are quite noisy when in trees. Green rosellas forage in pairs or small groups of under 20 individuals, though larger groups of 50 to 70 have been observed at stands of blackberries or thistles in fields. When feeding, they generally hold food items in their left feet and extract edible parts or break and discard nut shells with their beaks.

== Status and conservation ==
Gould noted that early Tasmanian settlers regarded the abundant green rosella highly as food; he agreed that it was very tasty after trying it himself. Many farmers saw the species as a pest of orchards, and green rosellas were shot.

In 2016, the green rosella was rated as least concern on the IUCN Red List of Endangered species. This was on the basis of its large range—greater than 20,000 km^{2} (7700 mi^{2})—and small rate of decline in population. The King Island subspecies is listed under the Environment Protection and Biodiversity Conservation Act 1999 as vulnerable, and its population thought to number fewer than 500 birds. Around 70% of King Island's native vegetation has been cleared, and the remainder is highly fragmented and at risk of too-frequent bushfires. Like most species of parrots, the green rosella is protected by the Convention on International Trade in Endangered Species of Wild Fauna and Flora (CITES) with its placement on the Appendix II list of vulnerable species, which makes the import, export, and trade of listed wild-caught animals illegal.

== Aviculture ==
Green rosellas were regularly captured and kept as pets until the early 20th century. The species is reported to be hardier and easier to keep in captivity than other rosellas. However, it is not a popular bird in the aviary trade, possibly on account of its subdued colours. The species has a reputation for being apathetic and vulnerable to weight gain in captivity; hence it is recommended to be kept in a large aviary of at least 5 m (15 ft) long to keep it active, and to be fed little or no sunflower seeds. As it breeds late in the season, chicks are often small in the heat of summer and can suffer as a result.
