= Carlo Violani =

Carlo Violani (born 1946), is an Italian zoologist at the University of Pavia department of animal biology. A genus was named for the author, Violania, for a taxonomic treatment of the contentious genus Platycercus (rosellas), recognised as a subgenus Platycercus (Violania) Wells & Wellington, 1992 by later authorities.
