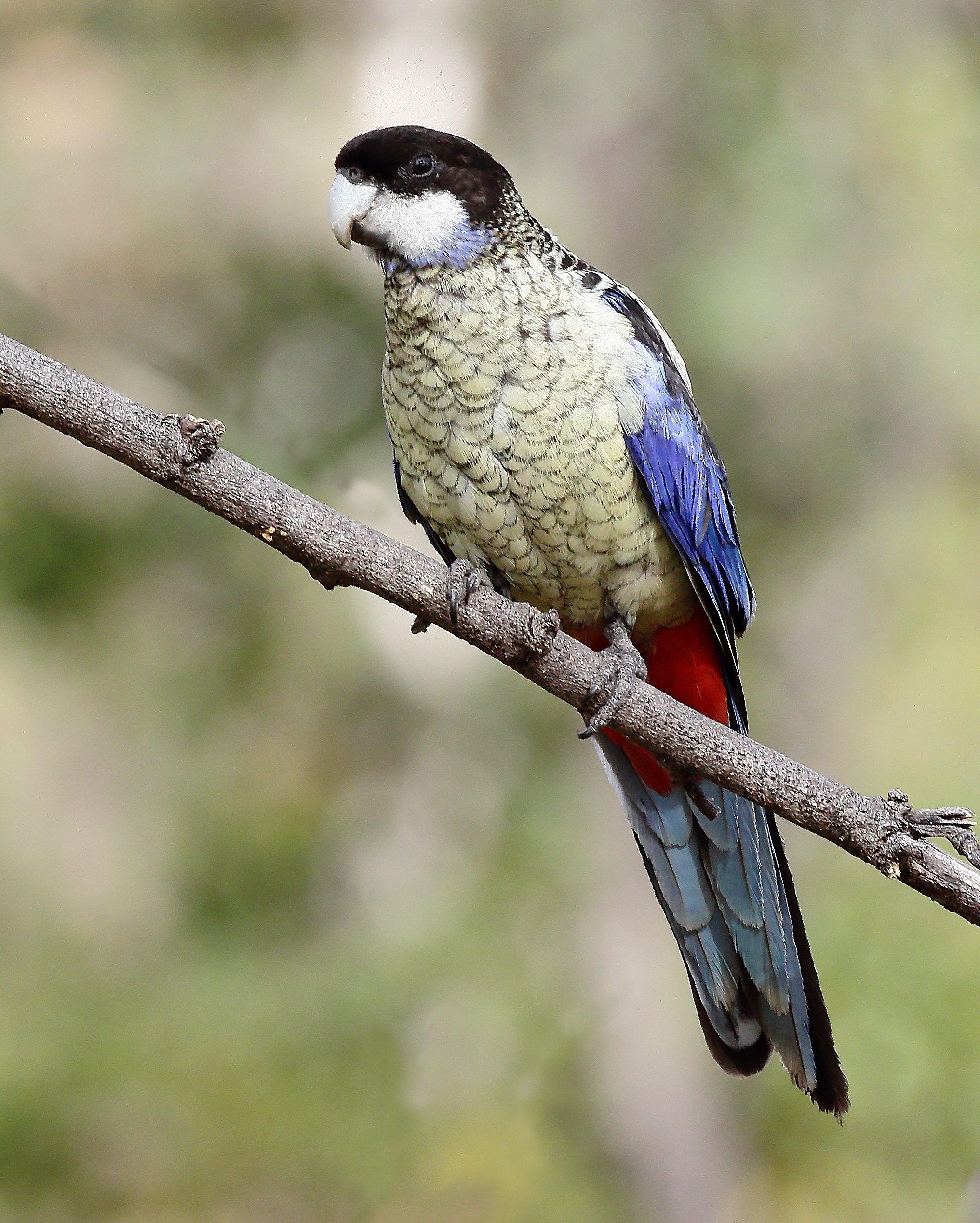

Conservation status
- Least Concern (IUCN 3.1)

Scientific classification
- Kingdom: Animalia
- Phylum: Chordata
- Class: Aves
- Order: Psittaciformes
- Family: Psittaculidae
- Genus: Platycercus
- Species: P. venustus

Binomial name
- Platycercus venustus (Kuhl, 1820)
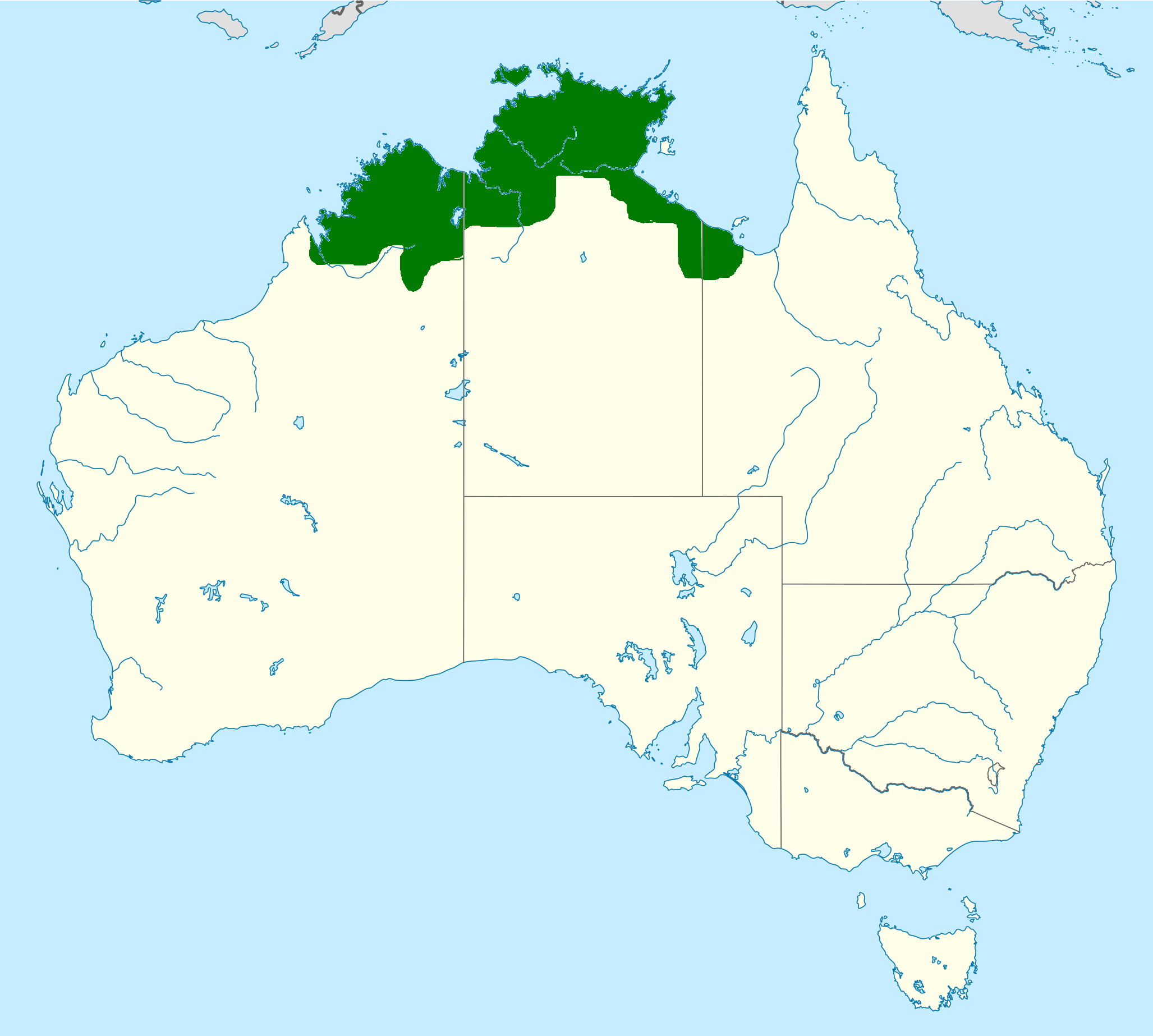
- Range (in green) in Australia

= Northern rosella =

Parrot native to northern Australia

The northern rosella (Platycercus venustus), formerly known as Brown's rosella or the smutty rosella, is a species of parrot native to northern Australia, ranging from the Gulf of Carpentaria and Arnhem Land to the Kimberley. It was described by Heinrich Kuhl in 1820, and two subspecies are recognised. The species is unusually coloured for a rosella, with a dark head and neck with pale cheeks—predominantly white in the subspecies from the Northern Territory and blue in the Western Australian subspecies hillii. The northern rosella's mantle and scapulars are black with fine yellow scallops, while its back, rump and underparts are pale yellow with fine black scallops. The long tail is blue-green, and the wings are black and blue-violet. The sexes have similar plumage, while females and younger birds are generally duller with occasional spots of red.

Found in woodland and open savanna country, the northern rosella is predominantly herbivorous, consuming seeds, particularly of grasses and eucalypts, as well as flowers and berries, but it may also eat insects. Nesting takes place in tree hollows. Although uncommon, the northern rosella is rated as least concern on the International Union for Conservation of Nature (IUCN)'s Red List of Threatened Species.

== Taxonomy and naming ==
The northern rosella was first described as Psittacus venustus by German naturalist Heinrich Kuhl in 1820. The description was based on an illustration by Ferdinand Bauer from a specimen collected by Robert Brown in February 1803, during Matthew Flinders' voyage around the Australian coastline. The specific epithet is derived from the Latin venustus, meaning "charming, lovely or graceful". Dutch zoologist Coenraad Jacob Temminck published the name Psittacus brownii in honour of Brown in 1821, and Irish zoologist Nicholas Aylward Vigors transferred it (as P. brownii) to the genus Platycercus in 1827, describing it as the "most beautiful of the family". However, John Gould wrote in his 1865 work Handbook to the Birds of Australia that "Hitherto this bird has been known to ornithologists as Platycercus brownii, a specific appellation in honour of the celebrated botanist; but which, I regret to say, must give place to the prior one of venustus."

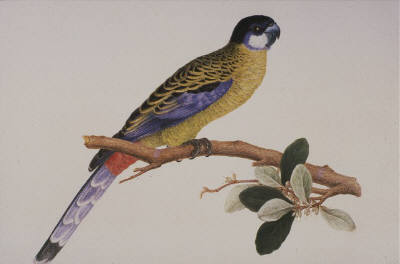
Painting by Ferdinand Bauer c. 1811–1813

Gregory Mathews described the subspecies P. venustus hillii in 1910, collected by G.F. Hill from Napier Broome Bay in Western Australia. He noted that its cheeks had more blue and less white than the nominate subspecies. The Victoria River marks the border between this and the nominate subspecies. Animal taxonomist Arthur Cain treated the subspecies as synonymous to the nominate, as the only difference of which he knew was the colour of the cheeks, but conceded further evidence could prove them distinct. As well as the differences in cheek plumage, the two differ in that subspecies hillii has brighter yellow feathers on the breast and belly with thinner black edges, and a consistently longer and wider bill. A subspecies, P. venustus melvillensis from Melville Island, was described by Mathews in 1912, noting it to have blacker plumage on its back. It is now thought to be indistinguishable from the nominate subspecies.

"Northern rosella" has been designated the official English name by the International Ornithologists' Union (IOC). Early names used include Brown's rosella, parrot or parakeet for its collector, with Brown's parakeet remaining a name used in aviculture in Europe and the United Kingdom, and smutty rosella, parrot or parakeet, from its dark plumage. Gould reported in 1848 that the latter was the local name used, and it was the most common name at the end of the 19th century. It was changed—possibly through bowdlerisation—to sooty parrot by the Royal Australasian Ornithologists Union (RAOU) in 1913. Bulawirdwird and Djaddokorddokord are two names from the Kunwinjku language of the western Arnhem Land.

One of six species of rosella in the genus Platycercus, the northern rosella and related eastern (P. eximius) and pale-headed rosella (P. adscitus) make up a "white-cheeked" lineage. A 1987 genetic study on mitochondrial DNA by Ovenden and colleagues found that the northern rosella was the earliest offshoot (basal) of a lineage that gave rise to the other white-cheeked forms. But a study with nuclear DNA by Ashlee Shipham and colleagues published in 2017 found that the eastern rosella was basal to the lineage that split into the pale-headed and northern rosellas, and hence, that non-sister taxa were able to hybridise among the rosellas.

== Description ==
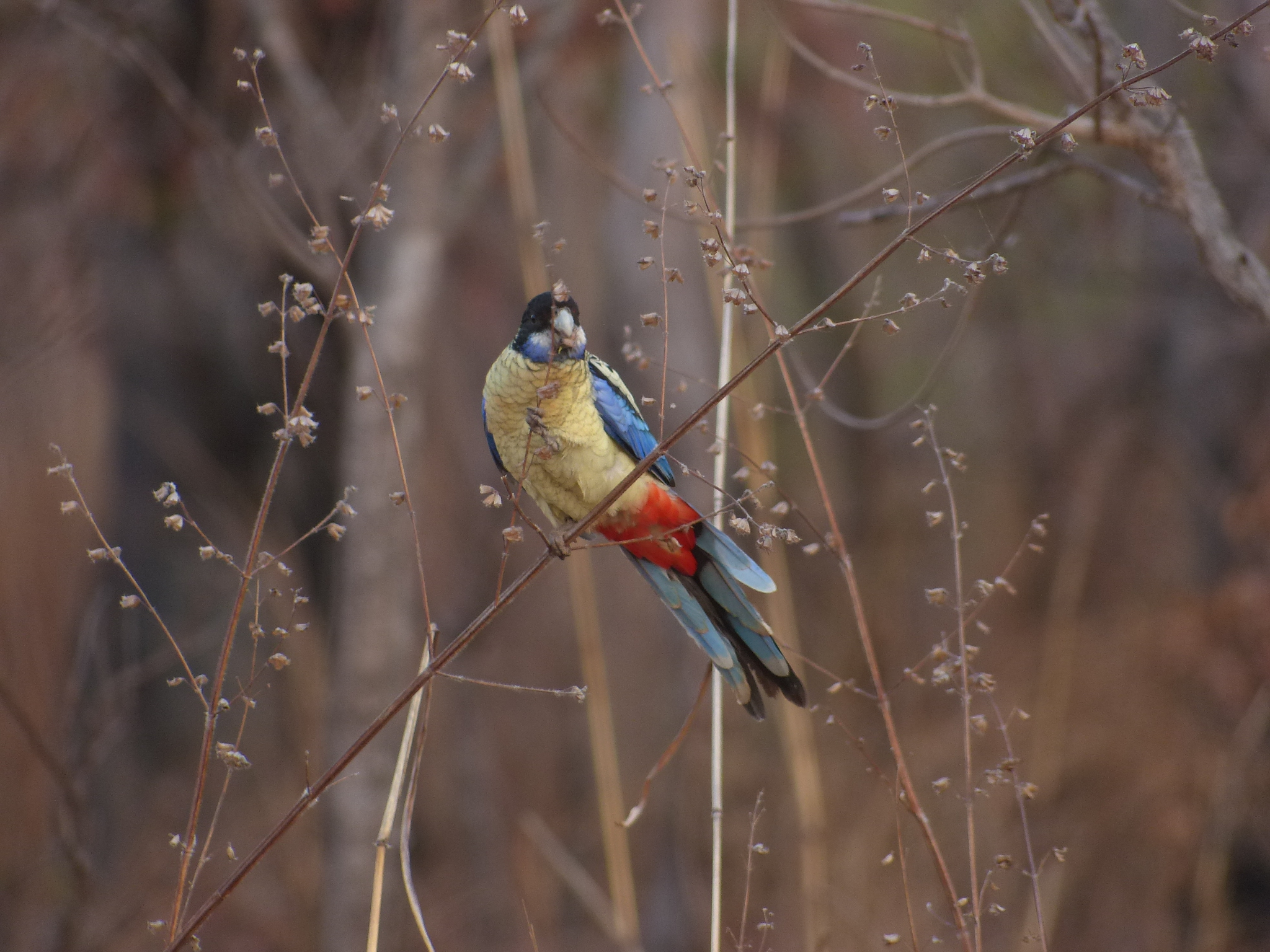
Subspecies hillii, Western Australia

Smaller than all rosella species except the western rosella, the adult northern rosella weighs 90 to 110 g (3.2 to 3.9 oz) and is 29 to 32 cm (11 to 13 in) long. It has broad wings with a wingspan of around 44 cm (17 in), and a long tail with twelve feathers. The sexes are almost indistinguishable, though some adult females have duller plumage and are more likely to have some red feathers on the head and breast. The adult bird has a black forehead, crown, lores, ear coverts, upper neck and nape, a whitish throat and large cheek-patches, which are mainly white with violet lower borders in the nominate subspecies, and more blue with a narrow white upper segment in subspecies hillii. The feathers of the lower neck, mantle and scapulars are black narrowly fringed with yellow, giving a scalloped appearance, while the feathers of the back, rump, upper tail coverts and underparts are pale yellow with black borders and concealed grey bases. Those of the breast have very dark grey bases, occasionally tinged with red. The undertail covert feathers are red with black fringes. The feathers on the upper leg are pale yellow tinged with blue. The central rectrices of the long tail are dark green changing to dark blue at the tips, while the other feathers are dark blue with two bands of pale blue and white tips. The undertail is pale blue with a white tip. The wings have a wide purplish blue shoulder patch at rest, with the secondary feathers edged darker blue and the primaries black edged with blue. The beak is off-white with a grey cere, the legs and feet are grey, and the iris is dark brown. Immature birds resemble adults but are duller overall, with less-well defined cheek patches. The black plumage in particular is more greyish, and there are more likely to be scattered red feathers on the head, neck and underparts.

== Distribution and habitat ==
The northern rosella is found across northern Australia. In Western Australia, it is found across the Kimberley south to the 18th parallel, around Derby, Windjana Gorge National Park, the northern Wunaamin Miliwundi Ranges, Springvale Station and Warmun, with vagrants reported at Halls Creek and Fitzroy Crossing. In the Northern Territory it is found from Victoria River north to the Tiwi Islands and east into western Arnhem Land, and across northern Arnhem Land through Milingimbi Island and the Wessel Islands to the Gove Peninsula. It is absent from central Arnhem Land, but is found further east around the western and southern coastline of the Gulf of Carpentaria, south to Borroloola and across the border into western Queensland as far as the Nicholson River.

The northern rosella lives in grassy open forests and woodlands, including deciduous eucalypt savanna woodlands. Typical trees include species of Eucalyptus, such as Darwin stringybark (Eucalyptus tetrodonta), Melaleuca, Callitris and Acacia. More specific habitats include vegetation along small creeks and gorges, sandstone outcrops and escarpments, as well as some forested offshore islands. The northern rosella is occasionally found in mangroves or public green spaces in suburban Darwin. It avoids dense forest.

== Behaviour ==
Not a gregarious bird, the northern rosella is generally found alone or in pairs, although several birds perch together in the same tree. Sometimes they are encountered in larger troops—usually 6 to 8 birds, but in rare instances up to 15 individuals. It is shyer than other rosellas, and flees to the upper tree canopy if disturbed. It is a quieter and less vocal species than other rosellas, and its call repertoire has been little studied. It exhibits a sharp and short chit-chut chit-chut contact call in flight; while perched it makes a three-note whistle on ascending scale or metallic piping sounds. Soft chattering can be heard while feeding, and sometimes when squabbling at the beginning of breeding season.

=== Breeding ===
Nesting occurs in tree hollows in the Southern Hemisphere winter, often in eucalypts located near water. The clutch is anywhere from two to five white matte or slightly glossy eggs, measuring roughly 26 x 21 mm (1 x 0.8 in). The female incubates the eggs alone, over a period of 19 or 20 days. Newly hatched chicks are covered with long white down and are largely helpless (nidicolous). They may remain in the nest for seven weeks after hatching and are fed by both parents. Fledglings remain with their parents for a year or more, often feeding together in small family groups.

=== Feeding ===
The northern rosella feeds on the ground in grassy glades in woodlands and on roadsides and riverbanks, as well as in the canopy of trees. It eats seeds, particularly those of eucalypts, wattles, cypress (Callitris intratropica) and grasses. It eats both the seeds and nectar of white gum (Eucalyptus alba), Darwin stringybark, long-fruited bloodwood (Corymbia polycarpa), fibrebark (Melaleuca nervosa) and fern-leaved grevillea (Grevillea pteridifolia). It also eats flowers, such as those of Darwin woollybutt (Eucalyptus miniata), and fruit. It also eats larval and adult insects.

=== Predation and parasites ===
The northern rosella is a prey item of the rufous owl (Ninox rufa). The bird louse Forficuloecus wilsoni has been recovered from the northern rosella.

== Conservation status ==
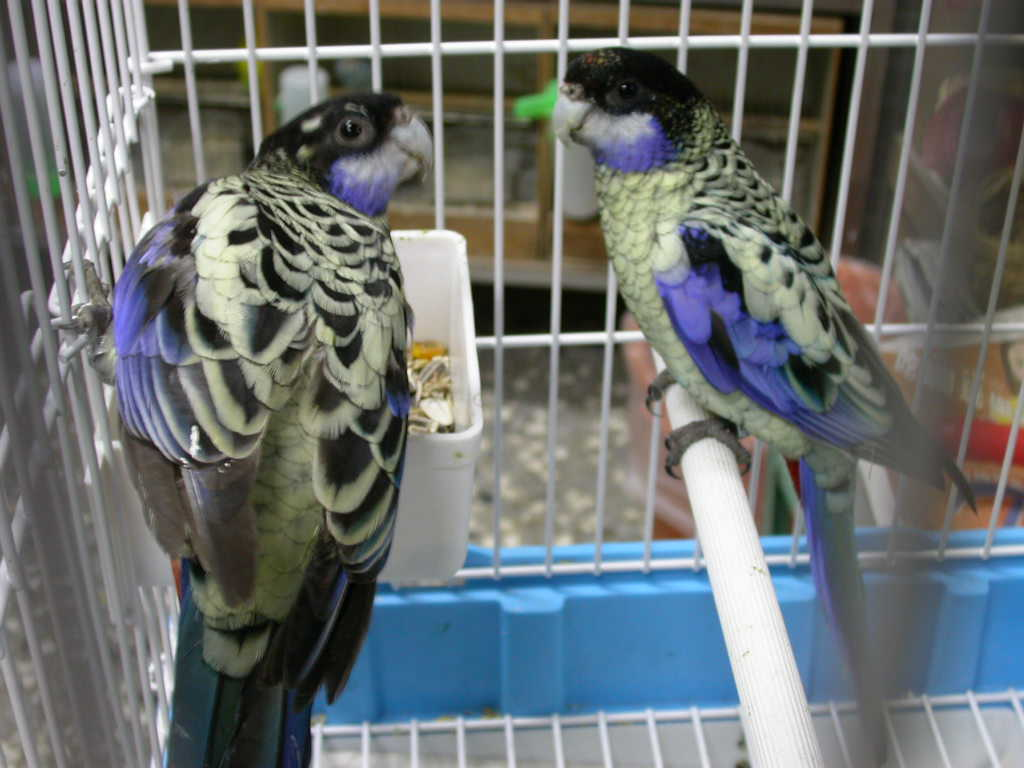
A pair in captivity with prominent blue cheeks

The northern rosella is listed as being a species of least concern by the International Union for Conservation of Nature (IUCN), on account of its large range and stable population, with no evidence of any significant decline. Despite this, the northern rosella is an uncommon bird. Grazing by livestock and frequent burning of grassy woodland may have a negative impact on northern rosella numbers. Like most species of parrots, the northern rosella is protected by the Convention on International Trade in Endangered Species of Wild Fauna and Flora (CITES) with its placement on the Appendix II list of vulnerable species, which makes the import, export and trade of listed wild-caught animals illegal.

== Aviculture ==
Most northern rosellas in captivity in Australia are the nominate subspecies, but there are blue-cheeked specimens that are either subspecies hillii or intermediate. Its attractive colours make it a desirable species to keep. In captivity in the Northern Hemisphere, the northern rosella has been reported to breed in the same calendar months as it does in its Southern Hemisphere native range. As it breeds early in the season, clutches laid in cooler months of cooler Australian states may fail. Breeders have attempted to use sprinklers in enclosures to induce pairs to breed at other times.
