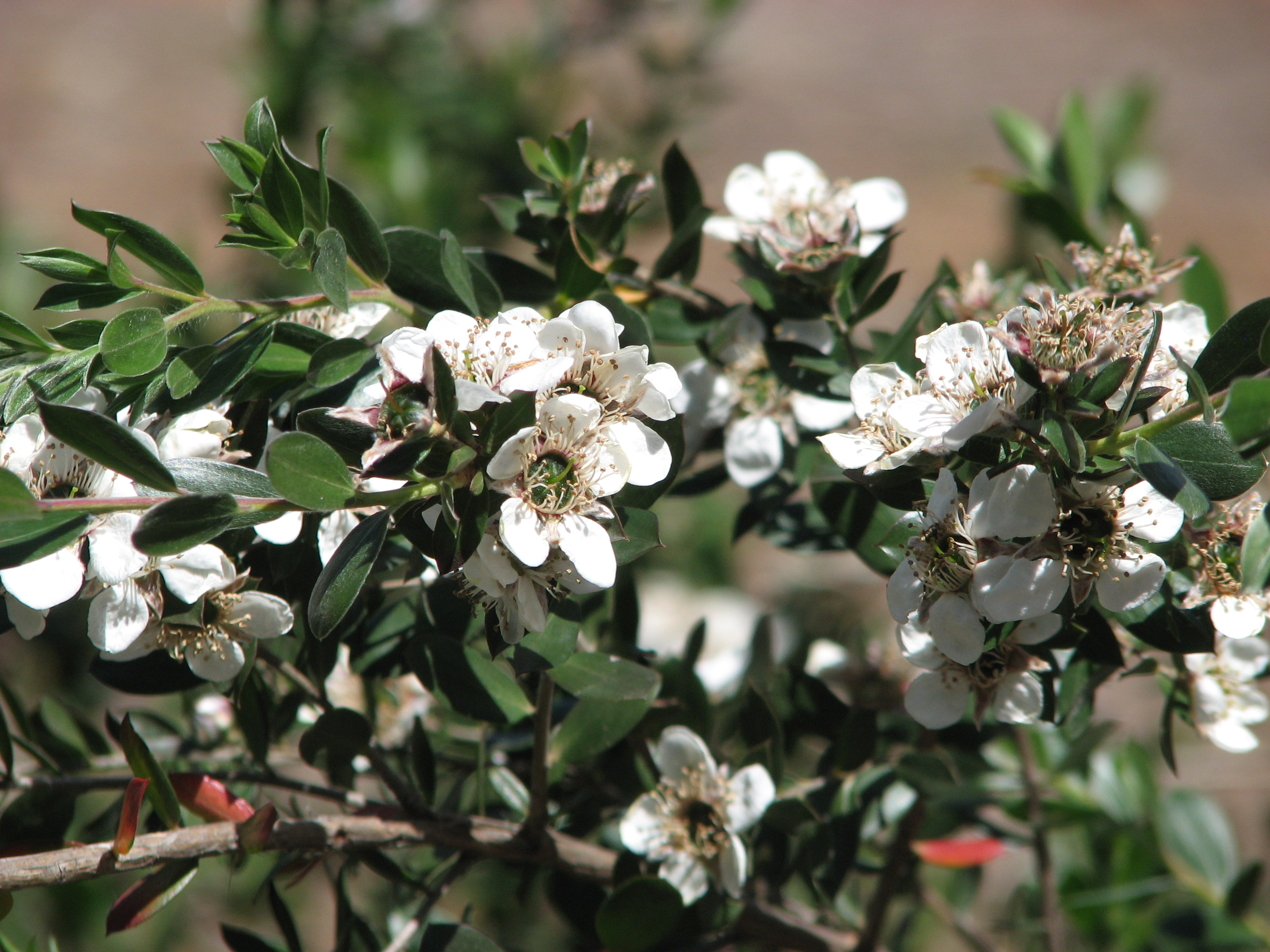
- Leptospermum nitidum in Maranoa Gardens

Scientific classification
- Kingdom: Plantae
- Clade: Tracheophytes
- Clade: Angiosperms
- Clade: Eudicots
- Clade: Rosids
- Order: Myrtales
- Family: Myrtaceae
- Genus: Leptospermum
- Species: L. nitidum

Binomial name
- Leptospermum nitidum Hook.f.

Synonyms
- Leptospermum flavescens var. nitidum (Hook.f.) Rodway; Leptospermum pubescens var. nitidum (Hook.f.) Domin

= Leptospermum nitidum =

Shiny tea-tree

Species of shrub

Leptospermum nitidum, commonly known as shiny tea-tree, is a species of compact shrub that is endemic to Tasmania. It has crowded, aromatic, elliptical leaves, white flowers about 15 mm (0.59 in) in diameter and fruit that remain on the plants until it is burned or dies.

== Description ==
Leptospermum nitudum is a densely foliaged, compact shrub that typically grows to a height of 2 m (6 ft 7 in) and has scaly bark. The leaves are aromatic, mostly glabrous, elliptical, 8–20 mm (0.31–0.79 in) long, 3–6 mm (0.12–0.24 in) wide and glossy, usually with a sharp point on the tip and tapering at the base to a short petiole. The flowers are white, about 15 mm (0.59 in) wide and arranged on the ends of leafy side branches. There are golden brown bracts and bracteoles at the base of the flower buds but that usually fall off before the flower opens. The floral cup is 4–6 mm (0.16–0.24 in) long with triangular sepals mostly 5–6 mm (0.20–0.24 in) long. The petals are about 6 mm (0.24 in) long and the stamens 2.5–3 m (8 ft 2 in – 9 ft 10 in) long. Flowering occurs in January and the fruit is a capsule 6–10 mm (0.24–0.39 in) long with the sepals attached and that remains on the plant at maturity.

== Taxonomy and naming ==
Leptospermum nitidum was first formally described in 1856 by English botanist Joseph Dalton Hooker in The Botany of the Antarctic voyage of H.M. Discovery ships Erebus and Terror. III. Flora Tasmaniae based on specimens collected by Ronald Gunn. The specific epithet (nitidum) is a Latin word meaning "shining" or "bright".

== Distribution and habitat ==
Shiny tea-tree grows in cold, moist, heath and is widespread in Tasmania, including on Cape Barren Island.
