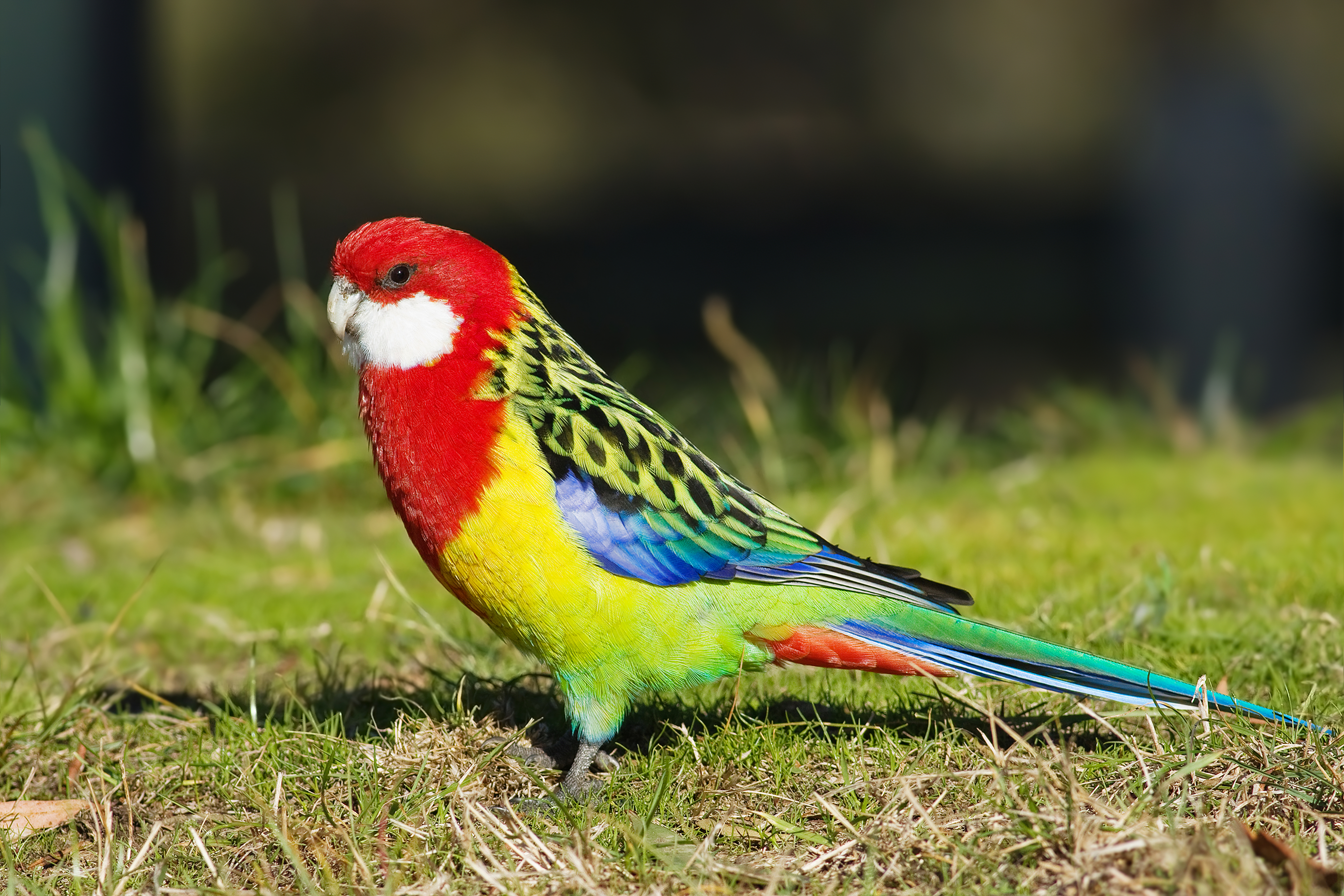
- P. e. diemenensis (male)
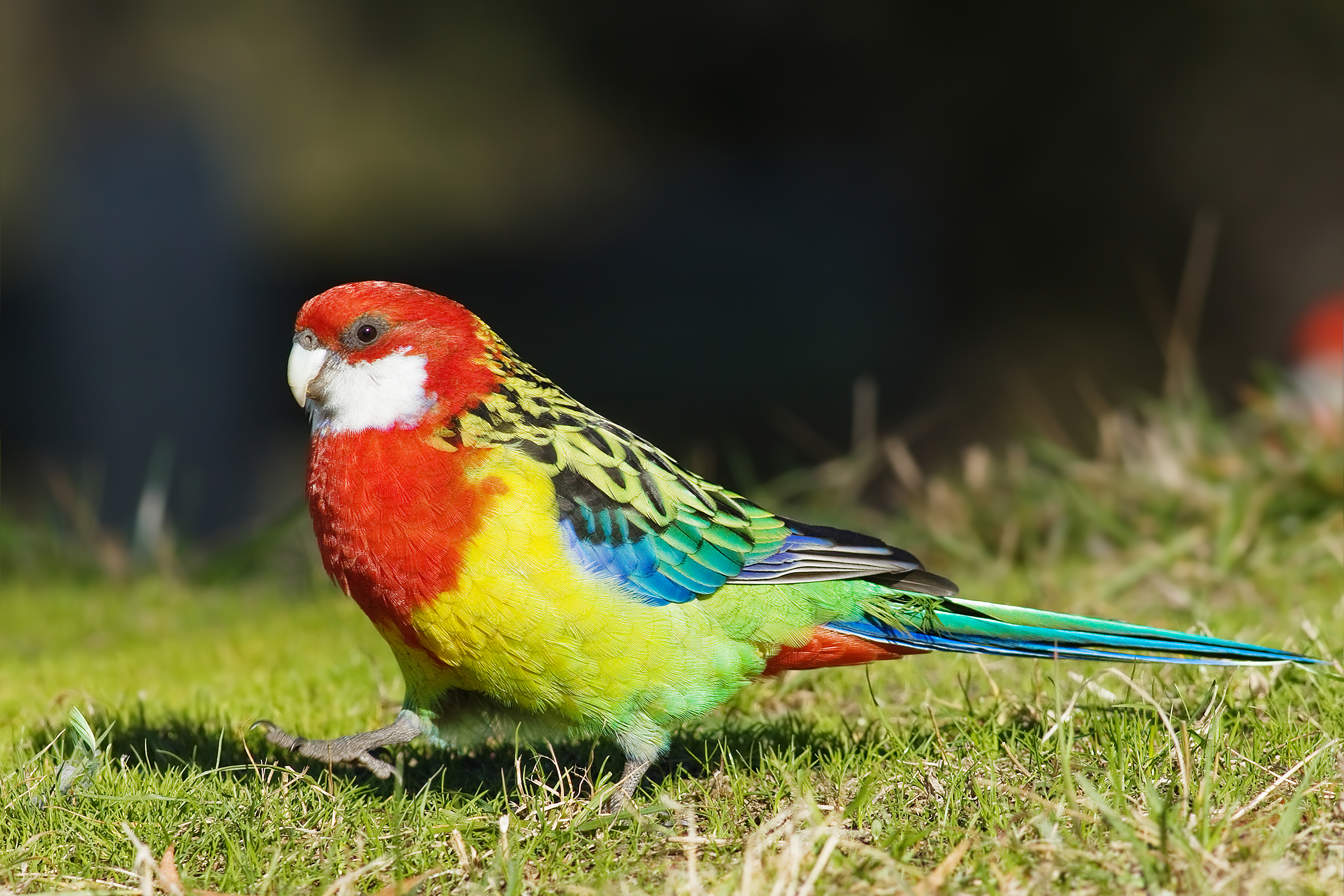
- P. e. diemenensis (female)

Conservation status
- Least Concern (IUCN 3.1)

Scientific classification
- Kingdom: Animalia
- Phylum: Chordata
- Class: Aves
- Order: Psittaciformes
- Family: Psittaculidae
- Genus: Platycercus
- Species: P. eximius

Binomial name
- Platycercus eximius (Shaw, 1792)
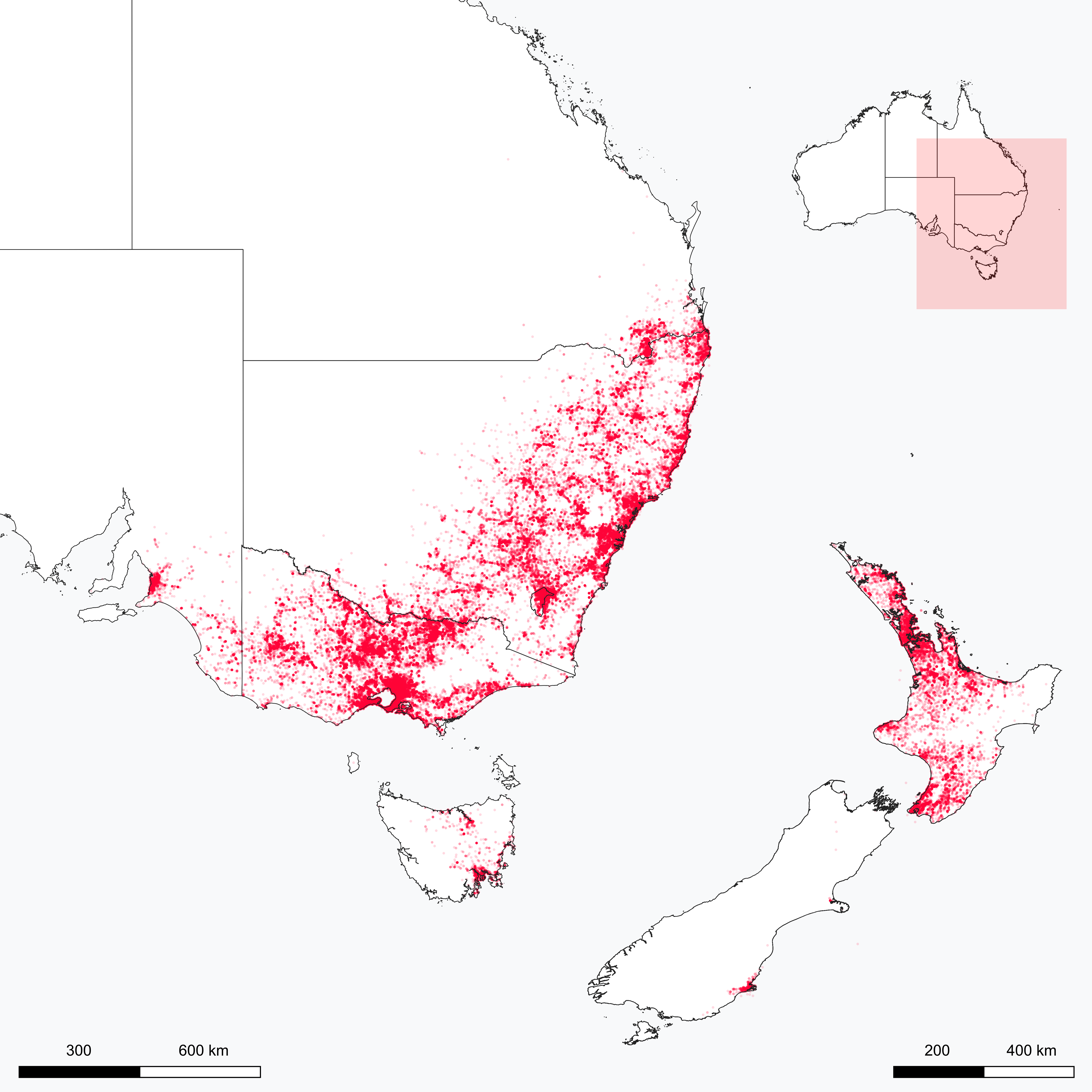

= Eastern rosella =

Species of bird

The eastern rosella (Platycercus eximius) is a parrot native and endemic to south-eastern Australia. It was first introduced to New Zealand in cages, and individuals were subsequently intentionally released or accidentally escaped into the wild. In New Zealand, it is now established in the North Island (notably in the northern half of the island, Taranaki, Waikato and in the Hutt Valley) and in the hills around Dunedin in the South Island.

== Taxonomy ==
The eastern rosella belongs to the genus Platycercus and subgenus Violania along with other three species members: northern rosella (P. venustus), pale-headed rosella (P. adscitus) and western rosella (P. icterotis). An early analysis of rosella phylogeny stated that the eastern rosella and pale-headed rosella are most closely related to each other, compared to the other two rosella species. However, a more recent mitochondrial study found that the eastern rosella was the earlier offshoot of the lineage that split into the pale-headed and northern rosella, and those non-sister taxa were hence able to hybridize.

The three subspecies of eastern rosella are:

- P. e. eximius, mainly found in Victoria and southern New South Wales, Australia. The black feathers on the back have green margins, and its rump is pale green.
- P. e. elecica, found in northeast New South Wales and southeast Queensland. For males, the black feathers on the back have golden-yellow margins, but greenish yellow in the female. For both sexes the rump is bluish-green. This subspecies is also called the golden-mantled rosella.
- P. e. diemenensis, found in eastern Tasmania. White cheek patches are larger and the red on the head is darker.

== Description ==
The eastern rosella is 30 cm (12 in) long. Its cheeks are white, and it has a red-coloured head. The beak is white, and the irises are brown. Its upper breast is red, and its lower breast is yellow and fades to pale green over the abdomen. The black feathers on the back and shoulders have yellowish and greenish margins which gives the scalloped look that differs between the sexes and subspecies. The wings and lateral tail feathers are bluish, the tail is dark green, and the legs are grey. Female colouration is similar to the males of the species, but their plumage is duller overall, and they sport an underwing stripe. Juveniles are duller than the females and have an underwing stripe.

== Distribution in New Zealand ==
The eastern rosella (Platycercus eximius) has become naturalised in New Zealand. Its first introduction occurred around 1910, when a small shipment of eastern rosellas, as well as a few crimson rosellas (P. elegans), was prohibited entry into New Zealand by the Customs Department. The birds were released off Otago Heads by the ship's crew before returning to Sydney. In another incident, approximately 12 captive rosellas escaped in Dunedin when their cages were damaged in a gale.

By the 1970s, the population of eastern rosella had become well-established throughout Auckland, Northland, and the far north, extending into western Waikato as far south as Kawhia and Te Kūiti, and east to the Coromandel Peninsula. The species was also seen in the Wellington-Hutt Valley Region, and began colonizing the foothills of the Tararua Range, extending east to Eketāhuna, and west to Ōtaki by 1985. Sightings also have been reported in the areas like New Plymouth, Taupō, Gisborne, Tiritea, Banks Peninsula, Nelson area, and Stewart Island. In Otago in the South Island, the eastern rosella population has remained relatively small, in contrast to North Island populations, which are widely distributed and currently inhabit most of the island. It is believed that the metapopulation of eastern rosella in New Zealand arose from three main sites of establishment: Dunedin, Auckland, and Wellington.

=== Distribution in Otago ===
Eastern rosellas were well-distributed in Dunedin by the 1930s, and between 1940s and 1950s they had been sighted across Otago. However, from 1950 to 1970s, the sightings of eastern rosella in Otago decreased, and the population was reported to be in decline. The decrease of population was attributed to the collateral poisoning by strychnine intended for rabbits, and also due to capture for the pet trade. Since the 1980s, there has been an increase in sightings of the species, which reflects a recovery of the eastern rosella population around Dunedin.

=== Distribution in Auckland ===
In 1960s, eastern rosellas mainly spread across the middle and upper Northland areas. Then, by the 1970s this species was reported in Waikato, followed by Coromandel, the Bay of Plenty and Taranaki. From 1975-76, the records of eastern rosella in the areas of mid-Coromandel and Waiheke Island suggest that they most likely spread to the Coromandel Peninsula from Waikato. During the early colonisation in Taranaki, this species was more commonly seen in Waikato compared to Manawatū, which suggests that the eastern rosella population in Taranaki expanded southward from Auckland, with recent observations that shows a continuous presence in the western North Island.

=== Distribution in Wellington ===
The increase in the population of eastern rosella in Wellington led to further spread into northern Wellington, Manawatū and Waitapa. However, in Kapiti and Mana Islands, there have been no occurrences. There is also an established wild population in the Waikanae area.

== Habitat ==
Generally, eastern rosellas prefer living in lowlands. In New Zealand, they live along the edges or remnant patches of open forest areas, surrounding shelter belts, gumlands, and orchards. Eastern rosellas are also frequently observed in cultivated exotic crops and urban areas. In these urban areas, the birds prefer to inhabit well-maintained lawns such as gardens and golf courses. Throughout Australia and New Zealand, eastern rosellas favour open areas and agricultural land.

== Diet and foraging behaviour ==
Being an arboreal bird, the eastern rosella mostly feeds on grass seeds, buds, flowers, nectars, fruits, as well as insects and their larvae. Their diet is composed of a wide range of food, with reports of them feeding on 50 different plant species and 15 species of animals. Their diet may include both native and non-native plant species in New Zealand such as eucalypts (Eucalyptus spp.), ngaio (Myoporum laetum), willow (Salix spp.), poplar (Populus spp.), and karaka (Corynocarpus laevigatus).

== Breeding ==
In Australia, eastern rosellas usually breed in the austral summer from August to February. They are cavity nesters, and build their nests in the hollow trees and nest boxes. They may occasionally nest in human structures, like wall cavities. There is some concern that eastern rosellas may outcompete native cavity nesters like Cyanoramphus parakeets for suitable nesting locations. Female eastern rosellas lay 5 to 6 eggs on average, at intervals of 1 to 3 days. The eggs are usually laid in mid-November and mid-December and are incubated for 18 to 22 days until hatching. Chicks fledge approximately one month after hatching. By 40 days post-hatch, fledglings are largely independent and can feed themselves without their parents. Eastern rosellas may lay up to two broods per season, which produce up to twelve offspring. Eastern rosellas can be highly territorial, and may destroy the eggs of conspecifics nesting too closely to their own nest.

=== Breeding success in urban areas ===
In urban areas, eastern rosellas were reported to face higher disturbances from other cavity-nesting birds, that leads them to infrequently visit to their nests, for instance, in the form of nest boxes. Less frequent of nests visits are often relates to higher predation rate, thus contributing to higher nest failures and lower breeding success. The rate of nest attendance is also influenced by the diet of the young. Other than predation rates, lower nest visitations could be explained by the ability of eastern rosella to feed on many food items during each visit, before returning to their young and transferring the partially ingested food.

Nevertheless, the presence of additional nesting sites could support the spread of the eastern rosella population and their establishment in urban areas. When provided with additional artificial nesting boxes over multiple period of breeding seasons, eastern rosellas were observed to occupy more of these particular nesting sites. Availability of nesting boxes could help this species to compete with the introduced common myna.

== Gallery ==
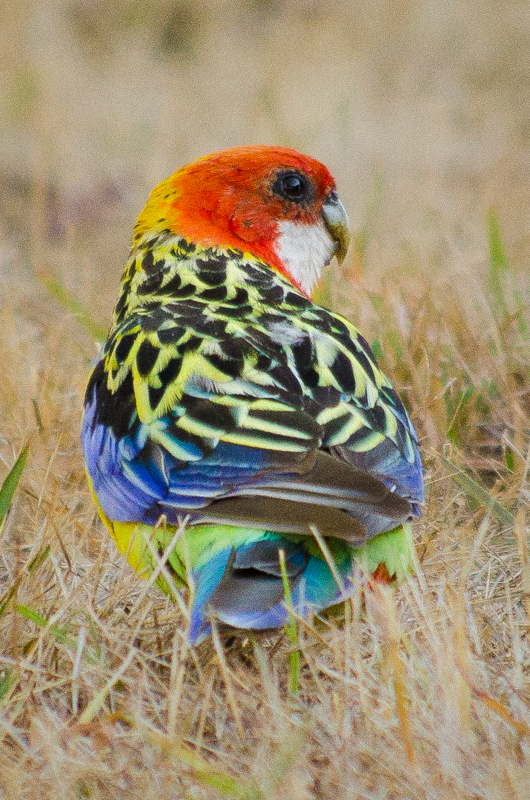
The eastern rosella can be easily recognised by its distinctive back plumage

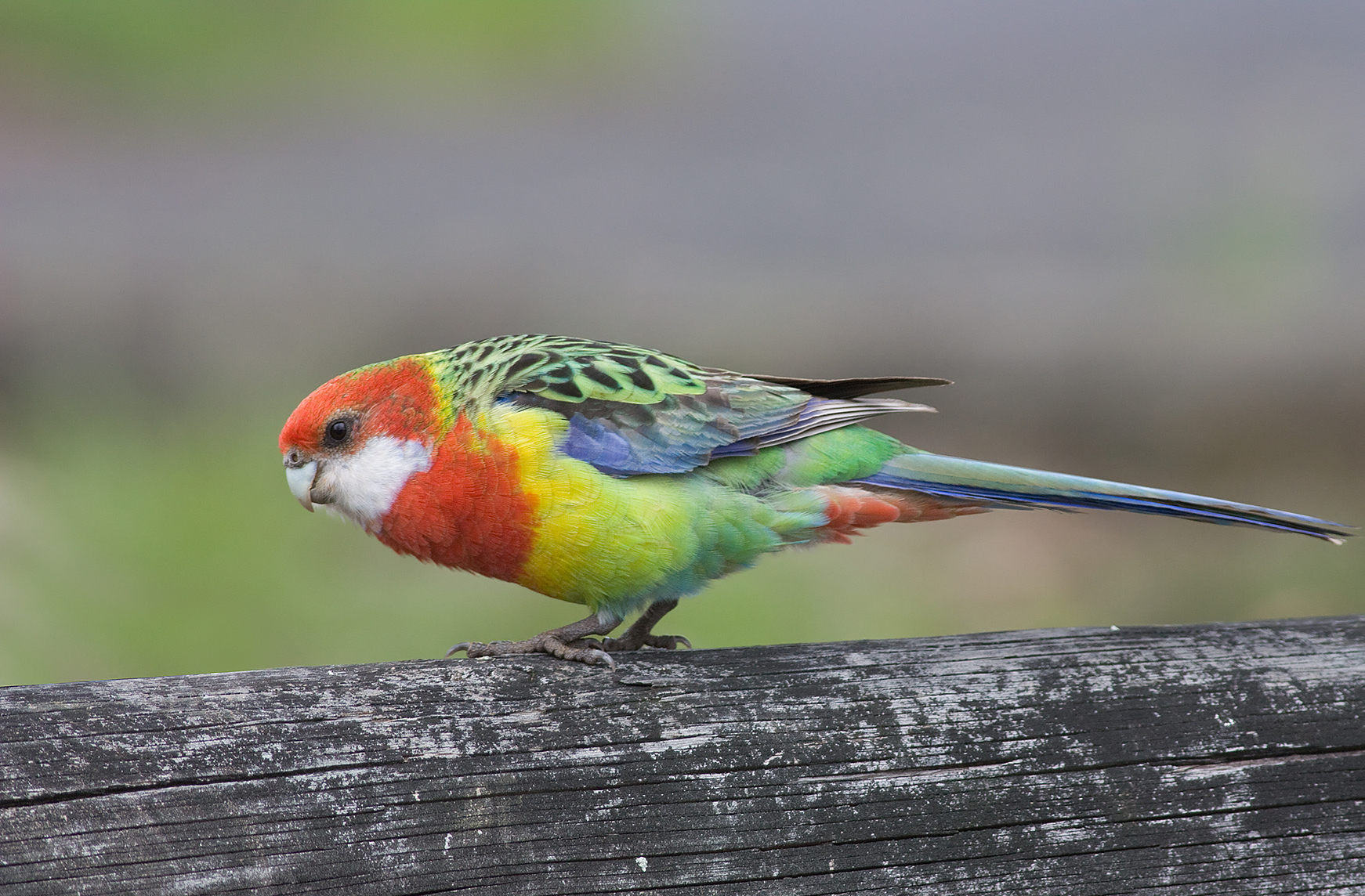
Juvenile of eastern rosella

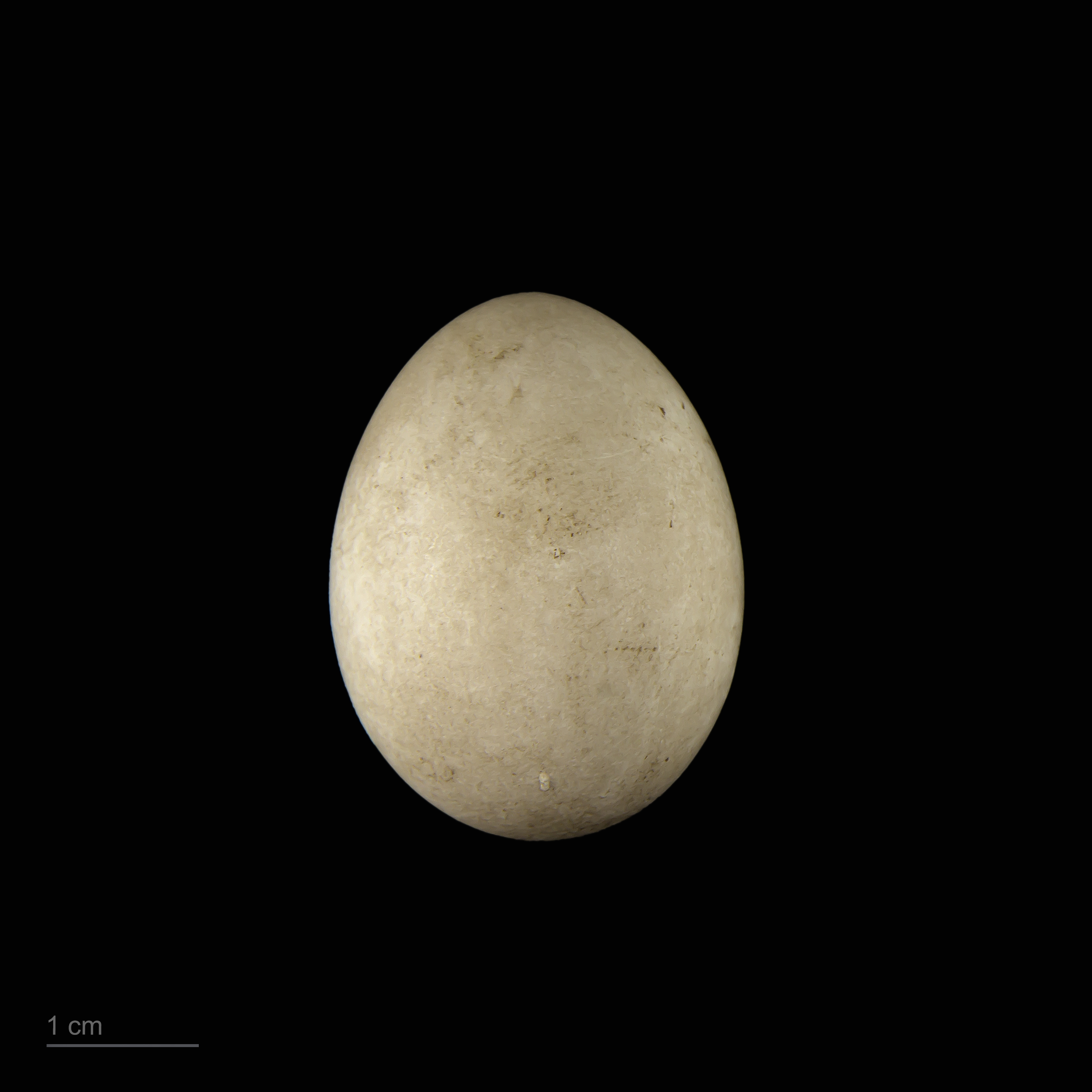
Egg of eastern rosella - MHNT

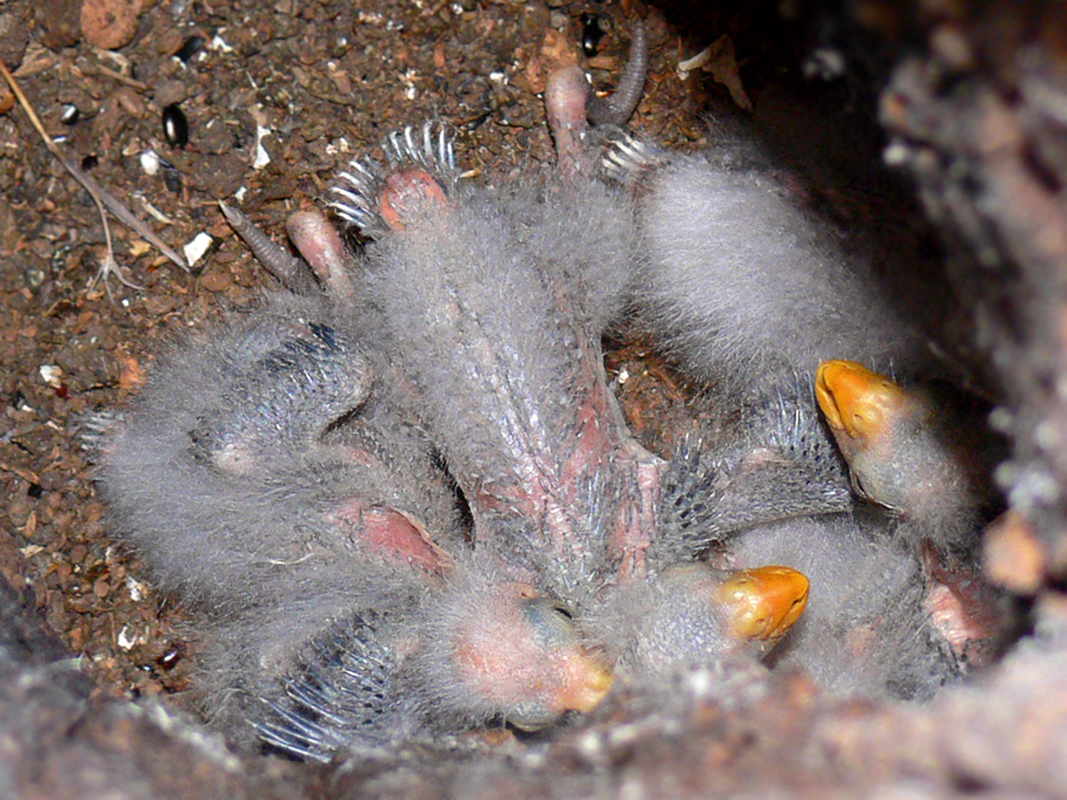
Chicks of eastern rosella
