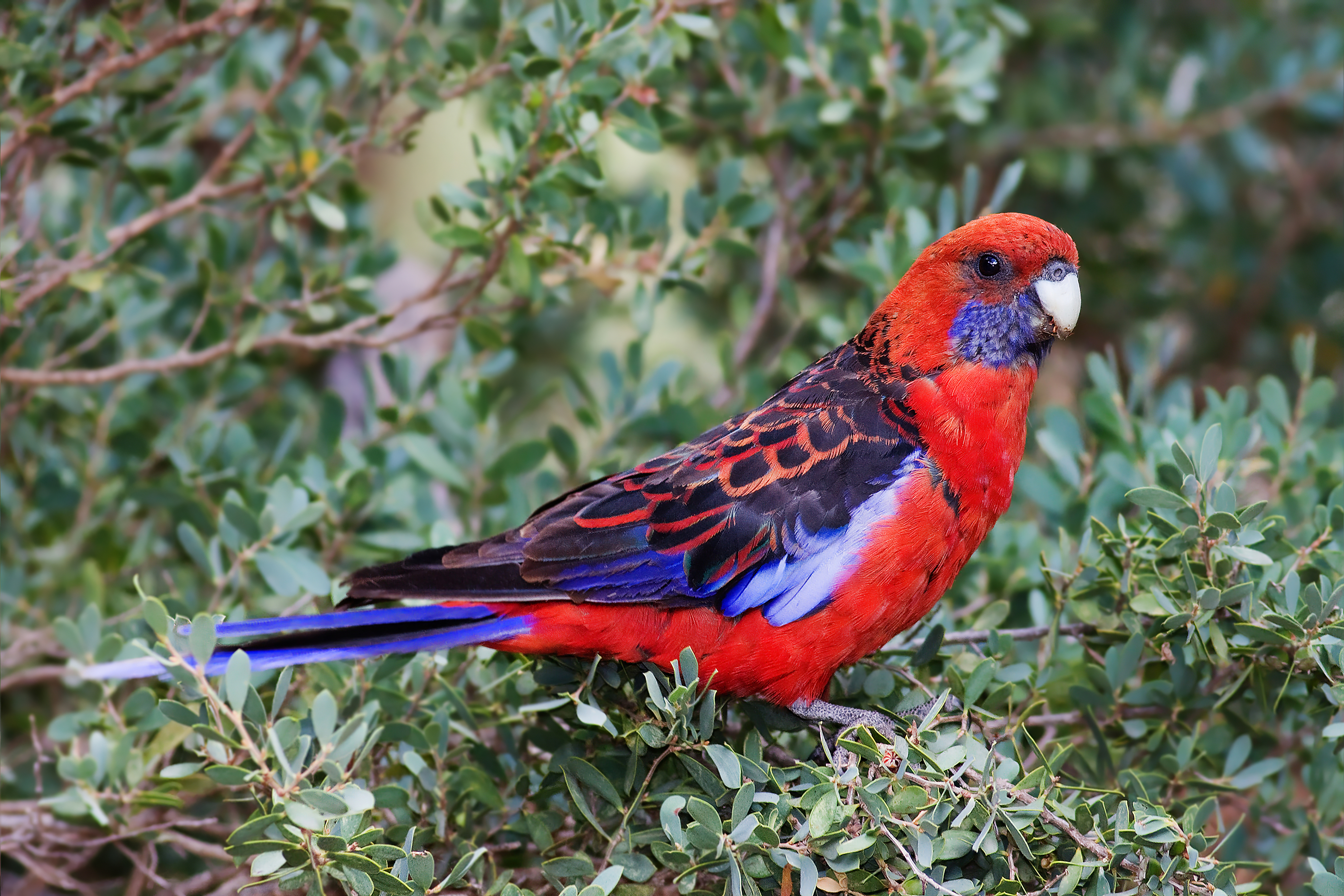
- Adult crimson rosella (P. elegans)

Scientific classification
- Kingdom: Animalia
- Phylum: Chordata
- Class: Aves
- Order: Psittaciformes
- Family: Psittaculidae
- Tribe: Platycercini
- Genus: Platycercus; Vigors, 1825

Type species
- Psittacus pennantii Latham, 1790

Species
- Platycercus icterotis; Platycercus elegans; Platycercus caledonicus; Platycercus adscitus; Platycercus eximius; Platycercus venustus

= Rosella =

Genus of birds

Rosellas /roʊˈzɛləz/ are in a genus that consists of six species and nineteen subspecies. These colourful parrots from Australia are in the genus Platycercus. Platycercus means "broad-tailed" or "flat-tailed", reflecting a feature common to the rosellas and other members of the broad-tailed parrot tribe. Their diet is mainly seeds and fruit.

== Taxonomy ==
The genus was described by naturalist Nicholas Aylward Vigors in 1825; the name Platycercus derived from the Greek platykerkos meaning "broad-" or "flat-tailed", from platys "broad, wide, level, flat" and kerkos "tail of a beast". The relationships with other parrots have been unclear, with the Australian ringneck (genus Barnardius) cited as a closest relative by some, and the genus Psephotus by others; the plumage of the western rosella seen as a link to the latter genus.

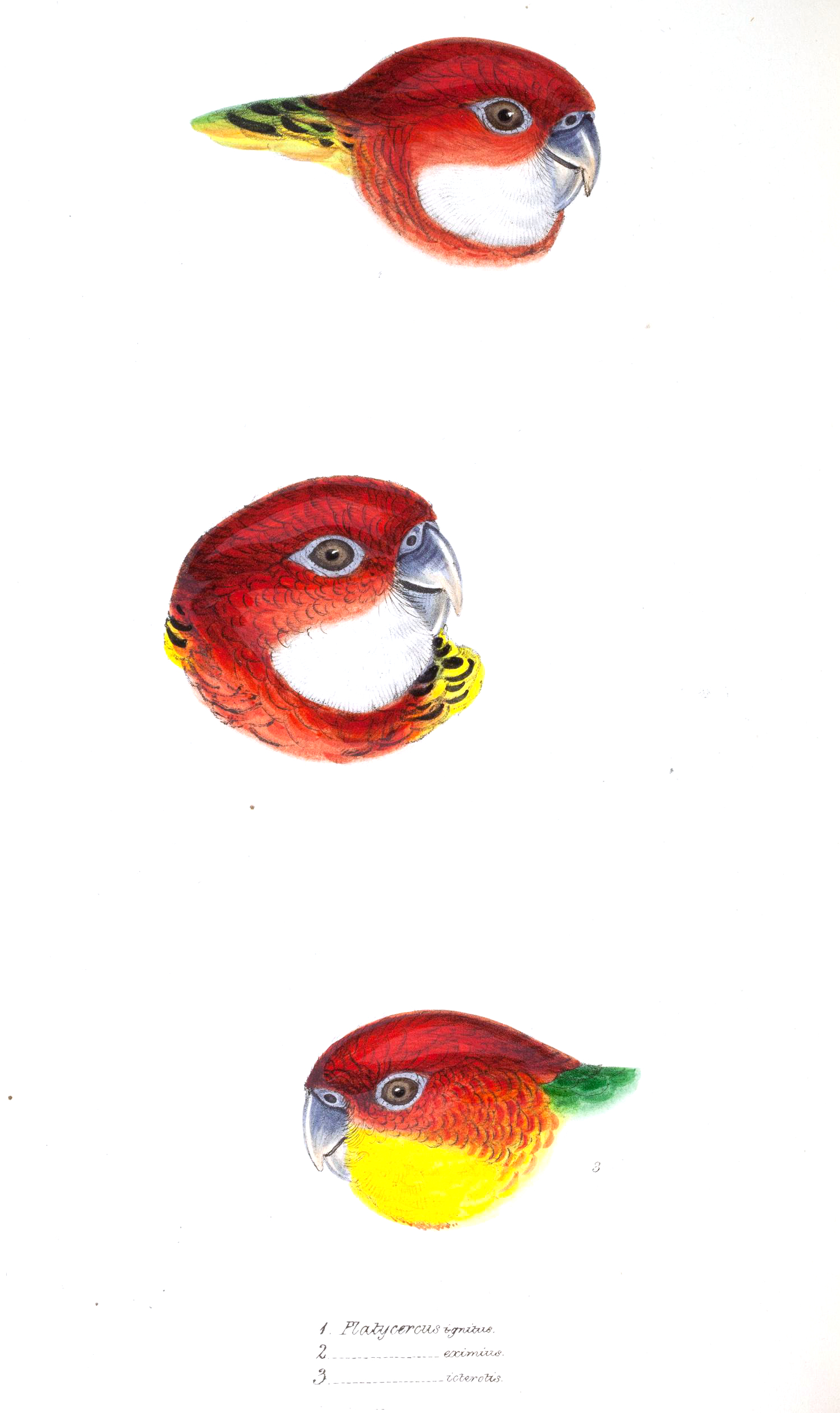
Comparison of Platycercus heads in Gould's Synopsis (1837).

Early European settlers encountered the eastern rosella at Rose Hill, New South Wales, now Parramatta, and so they called it the Rosehill parrot which became "Rosehiller", and eventually "rosella". Vigors defined the genus Platycercus in 1825, based on the distinctive architecture of the feathers in the tail and wing, and designated the crimson rosella Platycercus elegans (as Platycercus pennantii) as the type species. The description as a flat or broad tail follows Heinrich Kuhl, who separated his psittacine specimens to a group with tails that were "narrow and cuneated", that is, a tapering wedged outline.

There are, broadly speaking, three groups of rosella species. They are the blue-cheeked species which includes elegans and caledonicus, the white-cheeked species, eximius, adscitus and venustus and the yellow-cheeked species, icterotis. The observed difference in plumage has been reinforced by molecular studies in 1987 and 2015 that place the icterotis as a basal offshoot.

There are six species and many subspecies: Ovenden and colleagues analysed mitochondrial DNA, confirming the blue-cheeked and white-cheeked lineages. They found P. caledonicus to be basal to the other blue-cheeked forms, with P. elegans nigrescens being divergent from other subspecies of P. elegans. Also, P. venustus was basal to P. eximius and P. adscitus. However, a mitochondrial study published in 2017 found that P. eximius was the earlier offshoot of the lineage that split into P. adscitus and P. venustus, and that nonsister taxa were hence able to hybridise. In 2015, Ashlee Shipham and colleagues published a molecular study based on nuclear DNA finding that P. venustus and P. adscitus were sister species, and that P. elegans nigrescens diverged earlier than P. caledonicus.

Genus Platycercus – Vigors, 1825 – six species
Common name	Scientific name and subspecies	Range	Size and ecology	IUCN status and estimated population
Green rosella	Platycercus caledonicus (Gmelin, 1788) Two subspecies: Platycercus caledonicus brownii, (Kuhl 1820); Platycercus caledonicus caledonicus, (Gmelin 1788)	Tasmania	Size: 37 cm (15 in) long, the largest rosella. It has a yellow head and underparts with blue cheeks and a red frontal band above the bill. The feathers on the back and inner wings are black with narrow green margins at their tips, and the outer wing feathers are blue and green. Rump olive and the tail green. Irises are dark brown and the bill is light grey. Habitat: Diet:	LC
Crimson rosella	Platycercus elegans (Gmelin, 1788) Eight subspecies: Platycercus elegans elegans, (Gmelin 1788); Platycercus elegans flaveolus, Gould 1837; Platycercus elegans fleurieuensis, Ashby 1917; Platycercus elegans melanopterus, North 1906; Platycercus elegans nigrescens, Ramsay, EP 1888; Platycercus elegans subadelaidae, Mathews 1912; Platycercus elegans adeleidae, Gould, 1841; Platycercus elegans filewoodi, McAllan & Bruce, 1989	East and Southeast Australia	Size: 36 cm long, seven subspecies, three of which are actually crimson. The red is replaced by yellow in the case of var. flaveolus and a mixture of red, orange and yellow in the Adelaide rosella. Habitat: Diet:	LC
Northern rosella	Platycercus venustus (Kuhl, 1820) Two subspecies: Platycercus venustus hilli, Mathews 1910; Platycercus venustus venustus, (Kuhl 1820)	Gulf of Carpentaria, through Arnhem Land to the Kimberleys in open savannah country, Australia.	Size: 28 cm long, forehead, crown and nape are black in colour with white-on-blue cheek-patches. The back and wing feathers are blackish with yellow borders, while the feathers of the belly, chest and rump are pale yellow with black borders giving rise to a scalloped appearance, tail is bluish green. The bill is pale grey. Habitat: Diet:	LC
Pale-headed rosella	Platycercus adscitus (Latham, 1790) Two subspecies: Platycercus adscitus adscitus, (Latham 1790); Platycercus adscitus palliceps, Lear 1832	Eastern Australia	Size: 30 cm long, mostly covered in blue except for the upper breast and head which are cream-yellow, the tail is blue-black and green, and an area around the vent is red. Habitat: Diet:	LC
Eastern rosella	Platycercus eximius (Shaw, 1792) Three subspecies: Platycercus eximius diemenensis, North 1911; Platycercus eximius elecica, Schodde & Short 1989; Platycercus eximius eximius, (Shaw 1792)	Australia and Tasmania. Introduced to New Zealand where feral populations are found in most of the North Island and the hills around Dunedin in the South Island	Size: 30 cm (12 in) long. Red head and white cheeks. The upper breast is red and the lower breast is yellow fading to pale green over the abdomen. The feathers of the back and shoulders are black, and have yellowish or greenish margins giving rise to a scalloped appearance that varies slightly between three subspecies and the sexes. The wings and lateral tail feathers are bluish while the tail is dark green. Habitat: Diet:	LC
Western rosella	Platycercus icterotis (Temminck & Kuhl, 1820) Two subspecies: Platycercus icterotis icterotis, (Temminck & Kuhl 1820); Platycercus icterotis xanthogenys, Salvadori 1891	Southwest Australia	Size: 26 cm (10 in) long, the smallest rosella. The male is mainly red with yellow cheek patches, green rump, and a dark green tail. The female is duller, with a mainly green head, reddish forehead, yellow cheeks, and variegated green-red underparts. Colours of scalloped back feathers differ between two subspecies. The bill is whitish and the irises are dark brown. Habitat: Diet:	LC

== Description ==
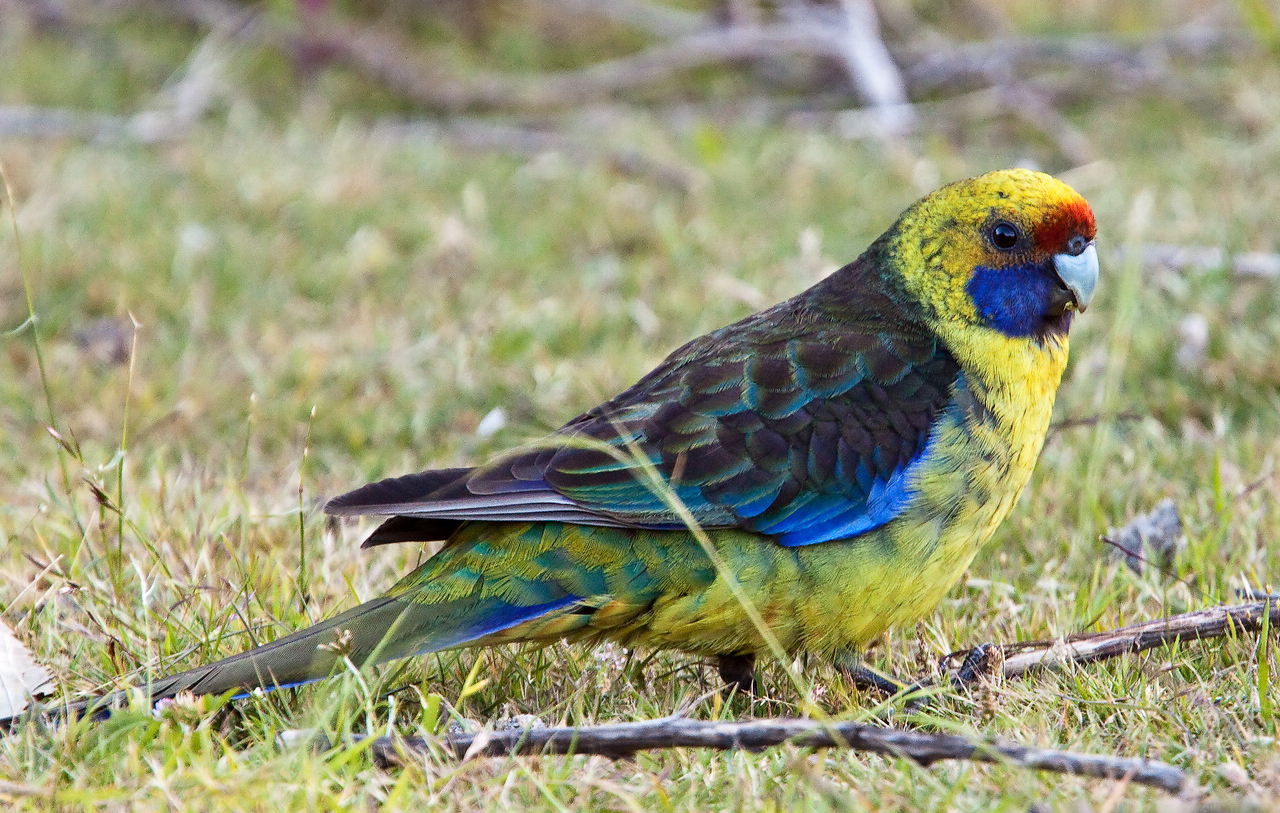
Green rosella in Tasmania. It is the largest rosella at 37 cm (14.5 in) long

Ranging in size from 26–37 cm (10–14 1/2 in), rosellas are medium-sized parrots with long tails. The feathers on their backs show an obvious scalloping appearance with colouring that differs between the species. All species have distinctive cheek patches. Sexual dimorphism is absent or slight – males and females generally have similar plumage, apart from the western rosella. The juveniles of the blue-cheeked species, and western rosella, all have a distinctive green-based plumage, while immature plumage of the white-cheeked species is merely a duller version of the adults.

== Distribution and habitat ==
Rosellas are native to Australia and nearby islands, where they inhabit forests, woodlands, farmlands, and suburban parks and gardens. They are confined to the coastal mountains and plains and are absent from the outback. Introduced populations have also established themselves in New Zealand (notably in the North Island and in north Dunedin) and on Norfolk Island.

== Behaviour and ecology ==
Rosellas feed predominantly on seeds and fruit, with food held in the foot. They enjoy bathing in puddles of water in the wild and in captivity. Rosellas scratch their heads with the foot behind the wing.

Mutual preening is not exhibited by the genus, and the courtship display is simple; the male waves his tail sideways, and engages in some head bobbing, and the female reciprocates.

Like most parrots, they are cavity nesters, generally nesting high in older large trees in forested areas. They generally have a clutch size of several eggs which are incubated for around 21 days by the female alone. The male feeds the female through this time and for some time after incubation concludes. Quickly covered in a white down, chicks take around five weeks to fledge.

== Aviculture ==
The more colourful rosella species are popular as pet parrots and also as aviary birds. They can live for longer than 20 years, and they are relatively easy to breed. All have a reputation for being aggressive in captivity, and are hence recommended be kept separate from other caged birds. Their diet in aviculture includes seeds, fruit such as apple, pear, and grapes, and vegetable matter such as lettuce, grass, and silver beet.

== Cited texts ==
- Forshaw, Joseph M. (2006). Parrots of the World; an Identification Guide. Illustrated by Frank Knight. Princeton University Press. ISBN 0-691-09251-6. OCLC 57893782.
- Lendon, Alan H. (1973). Australian Parrots in Field and Aviary (2nd ed.). Sydney: Angus and Robertson. ISBN 0-207-12424-8. OCLC 1139146.
