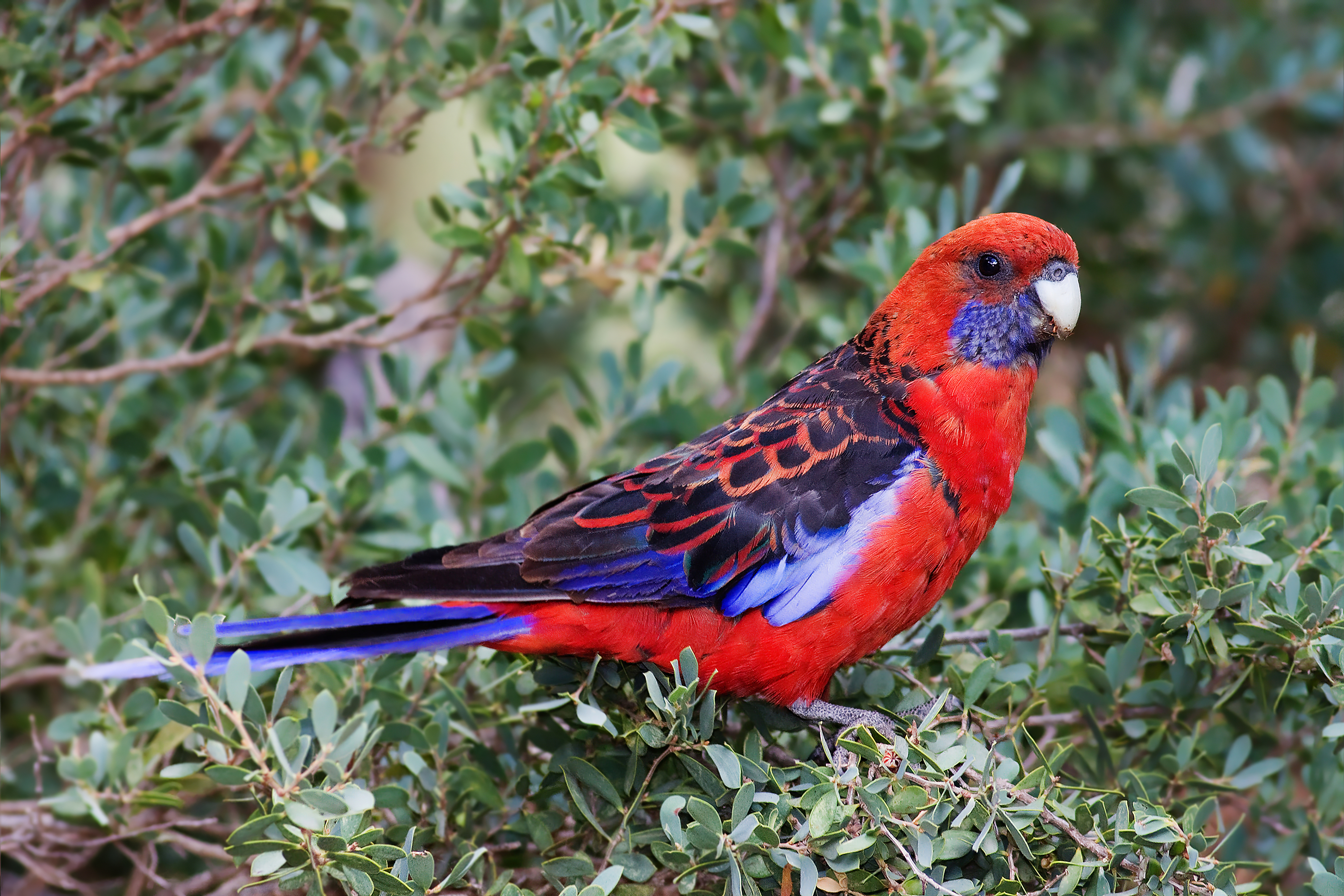
- Adult in Wilsons Promontory, Victoria

Conservation status
- Least Concern (IUCN 3.1)

Scientific classification
- Kingdom: Animalia
- Phylum: Chordata
- Class: Aves
- Order: Psittaciformes
- Family: Psittaculidae
- Genus: Platycercus
- Species: P. elegans

Binomial name
- Platycercus elegans (Gmelin, 1788)

Subspecies
- Platycercus elegans adelaidae; Platycercus elegans elegans; Platycercus elegans filewoodi; Platycercus elegans flaveolus; Platycercus elegans melanopterus; Platycercus elegans nigrescens; Platycercus elegans subadelaidae
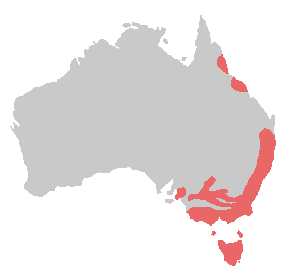
- Crimson rosella range (in red; all-year resident)

Synonyms
- Psittacus elegans, Gmelin; Psittacus pennantii, Latham, 1790; Psittacus gloriosus, Shaw, 1791

= Crimson rosella =

Species of bird

The crimson rosella (Platycercus elegans) is a parrot native to eastern and south eastern Australia which has been introduced to New Zealand and Norfolk Island. It is commonly found in, but not restricted to, mountain forests and gardens. The species as it now stands has subsumed two former separate species, the yellow rosella and the Adelaide rosella. Molecular studies show one of the three red-coloured races, P. e. nigrescens, is genetically more distinct.

== Taxonomy ==
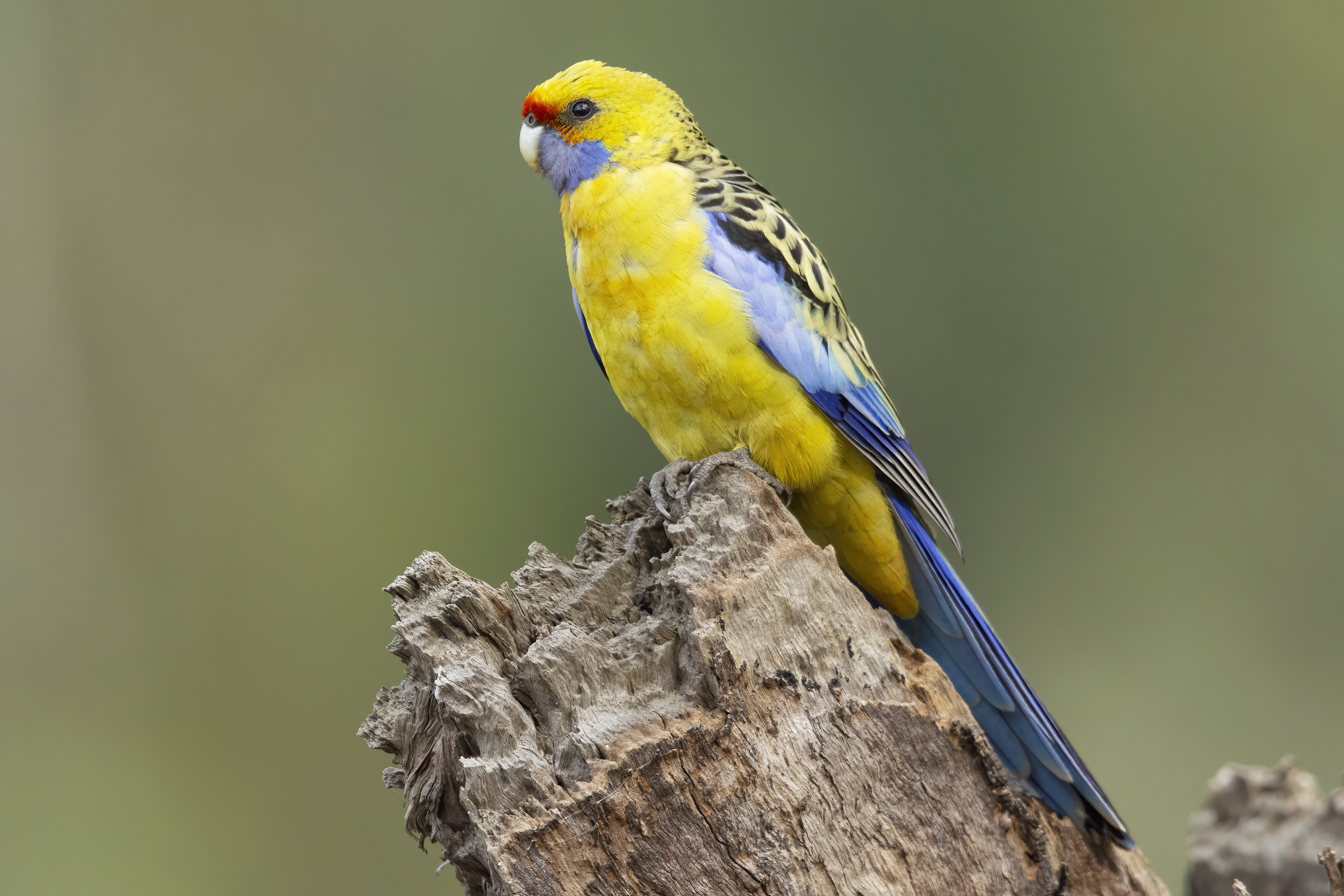
Yellow rosella (Platycercus elegans flaveolus)

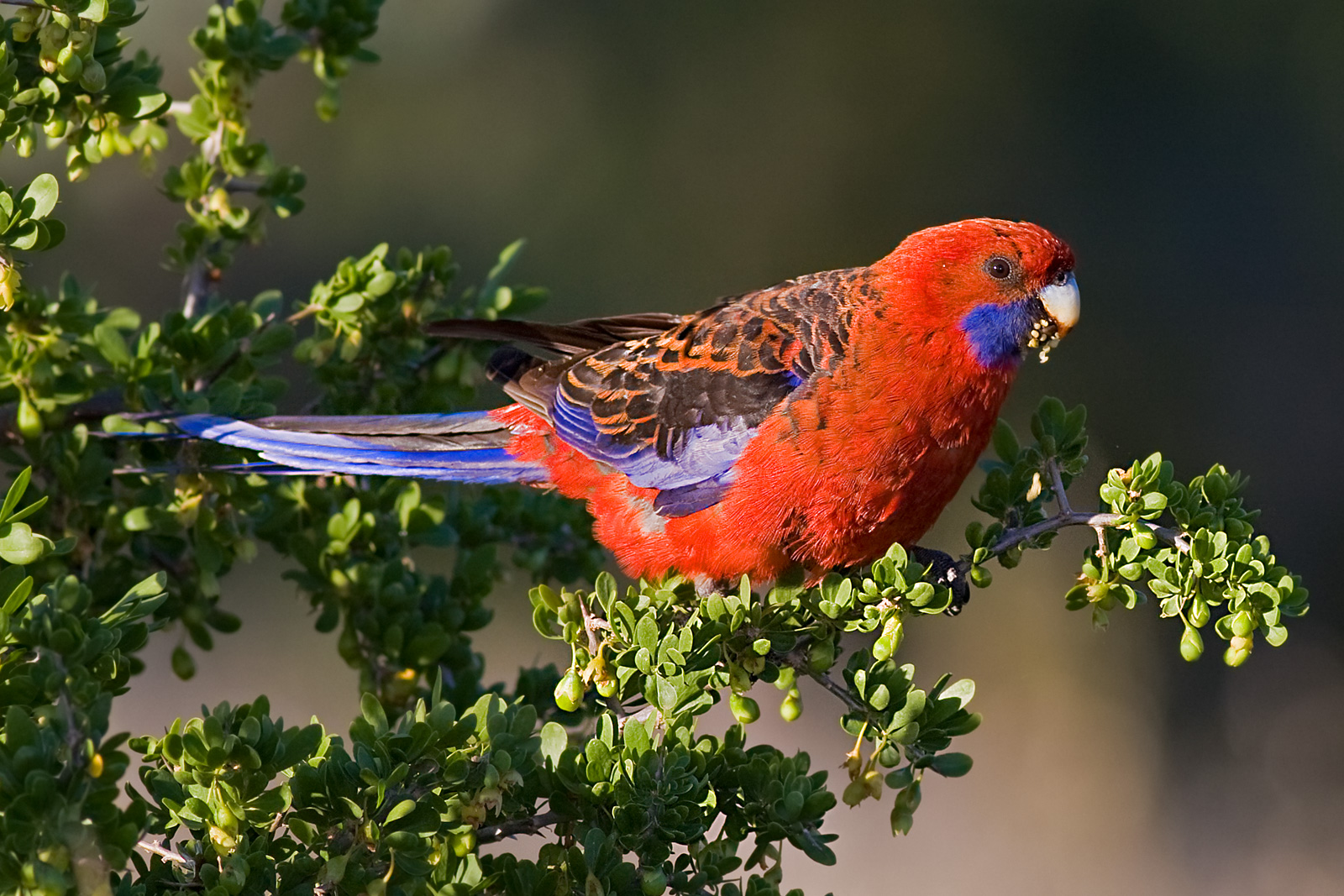
Swifts Creek, Victoria, Australia

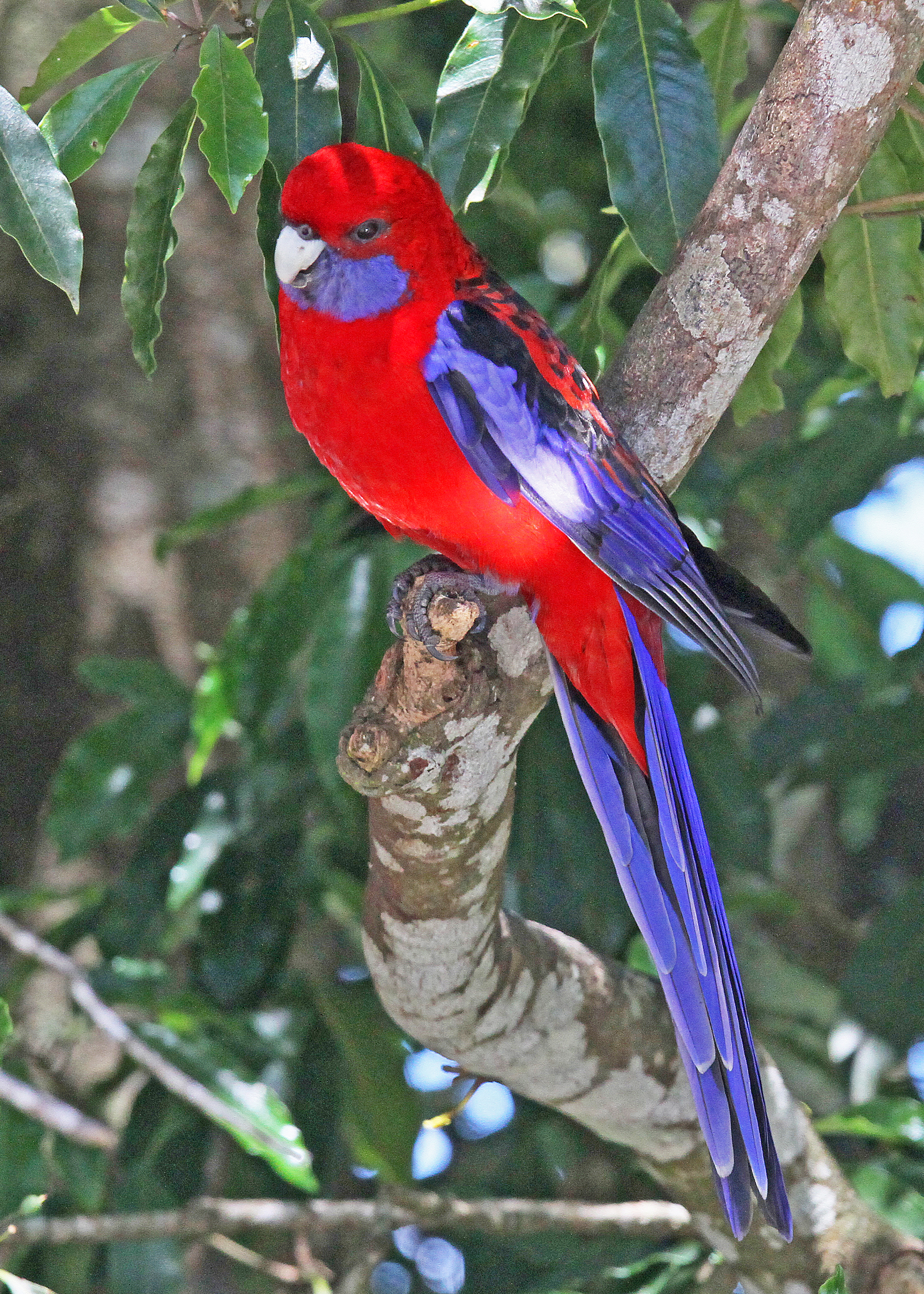
Lamington National Park, Queensland, Australia

The crimson rosella was formally described in 1788 by the German naturalist Johann Friedrich Gmelin in his revised and expanded edition of Carl Linnaeus's Systema Naturae. He placed it with the parrots in the genus Psittacus and coined the binomial name Psittacus elegans. This Latin name had been used in 1605 by the Flemish botanist Carolus Clusius in his book Exoticorum libri decem for the hawk-headed parrot, however this predates the start of Linnean taxonomy.

The crimson rosella had been described and named by John Latham in 1781 as the "Beautiful Lory", from a specimen in the collection of Sir Joseph Banks, and then as the "Pennantian Parrot" in 1787 in honour of Thomas Pennant. However, Latham did not give the species a binomial name until 1790, when he named it Psittacus pennantii.

Nicholas Aylward Vigors defined the genus Platycercus in 1825, based on the distinctive architecture of the feathers in the tail and wing, and designated the crimson rosella (as Platycercus pennantii) as the type species.

Most authors used Latham's combination Platycercus pennantii until 1891, when Italian zoologist Tommaso Salvadori established that P. elegans had priority, leading to its universal adoption thereafter.

Edward Pierson Ramsay described the subspecies nigrescens in 1888, noting its darker crimson plumage, black back and nape, and smaller size yet larger bill. It was also known as "northern crimson parrot" or "Campbell's parakeet", after Alexander James Campbell.

In 1941, Herbert Condon proposed that the yellow and Adelaide rosellas be reclassified as subspecies of the crimson rosella.

"Crimson rosella" has been designated the official name by the International Ornithologists' Union (IOC); however, it was not given this name until the publication of the 1926 RAOU checklist. Before this it had been known as the crimson parrot, while the term "rosella" had been restricted to the eastern rosella. The name "blue-cheeked rosella" was proposed for the united species elegans, but was not generally taken up.

Today, the red-coloured races are generally known as the crimson rosella, with the alternate names red lowry, Pennant's parakeet, Campbell parakeet, (blue) mountain parrot, (blue) mountain lowry or just plain lowry occasionally heard. Cayley reported that the first two alternate names were most common in the early part of the twentieth century. On Norfolk Island it is called simply red parrot.

The yellow rosella, also known by a variety of alternate common names including Murrumbidgee lowry, murray rosella, swamp lowry and yellow-rumped parakeet, was described as Platycercus flaveolus by John Gould, who gave it the last common name mentioned. It was reduced to subspecies status once hybridization was noted where ranges overlap. However, some authorities maintain the hybridization is not widespread and hence preserve its specific status. This view is in the minority.

== Description ==
Platycercus elegans is a medium-sized Australian parrot at 36 cm (14 in) long, much of which is tail. There are seven subspecies, only three of which are actually crimson. The red is replaced by yellow in the case of var. flaveolus and a mixture of red, orange and yellow in the Adelaide rosella.

Adults and juveniles generally show strikingly different colouration in south-eastern populations, with predominantly greenish-olive body plumage on the juvenile, most persistent on the nape and breast. Juveniles are said to 'ripen' as they get older and turn from green to red. All races have blue cheeks and black-scalloped blue-margined wings and predominantly blue tail with predominantly red coloration. The crimson rosella's blue tail feathers are one of the favourite decorations of the satin bowerbird. The bill is pale grey and the iris dark brown.

There is very little sexual dimorphism in crimson rosellas. The most noticeable difference between sexes is that males are up to 15% larger, and have a relatively larger and wider beak.

=== Subspecies ===
P. elegans elegans, the nominate race of Victoria and eastern New South Wales. P. elegans nigrescens, occurring on Queensland's northeastern coast, and P. elegans melanoptera on Kangaroo Island. The main distinction between these is size: nigrescens is the smallest of the three and melanoptera is the largest; both are slightly darker than the nominate race.

The juveniles of P. e. nigrescens lack the greenish immature plumage of the other subspecies of crimson rosella.

=== Yellow rosella ===
The yellow rosella, which lives along the Murray River and several of its tributaries, was reclassified (1968) as a subspecies, P. elegans flaveolus, of the crimson rosella as the two were found to interbreed where their ranges overlap. The main difference between the two is that the crimson areas are replaced with light yellow and the tail is more greenish.

=== Adelaide rosella ===
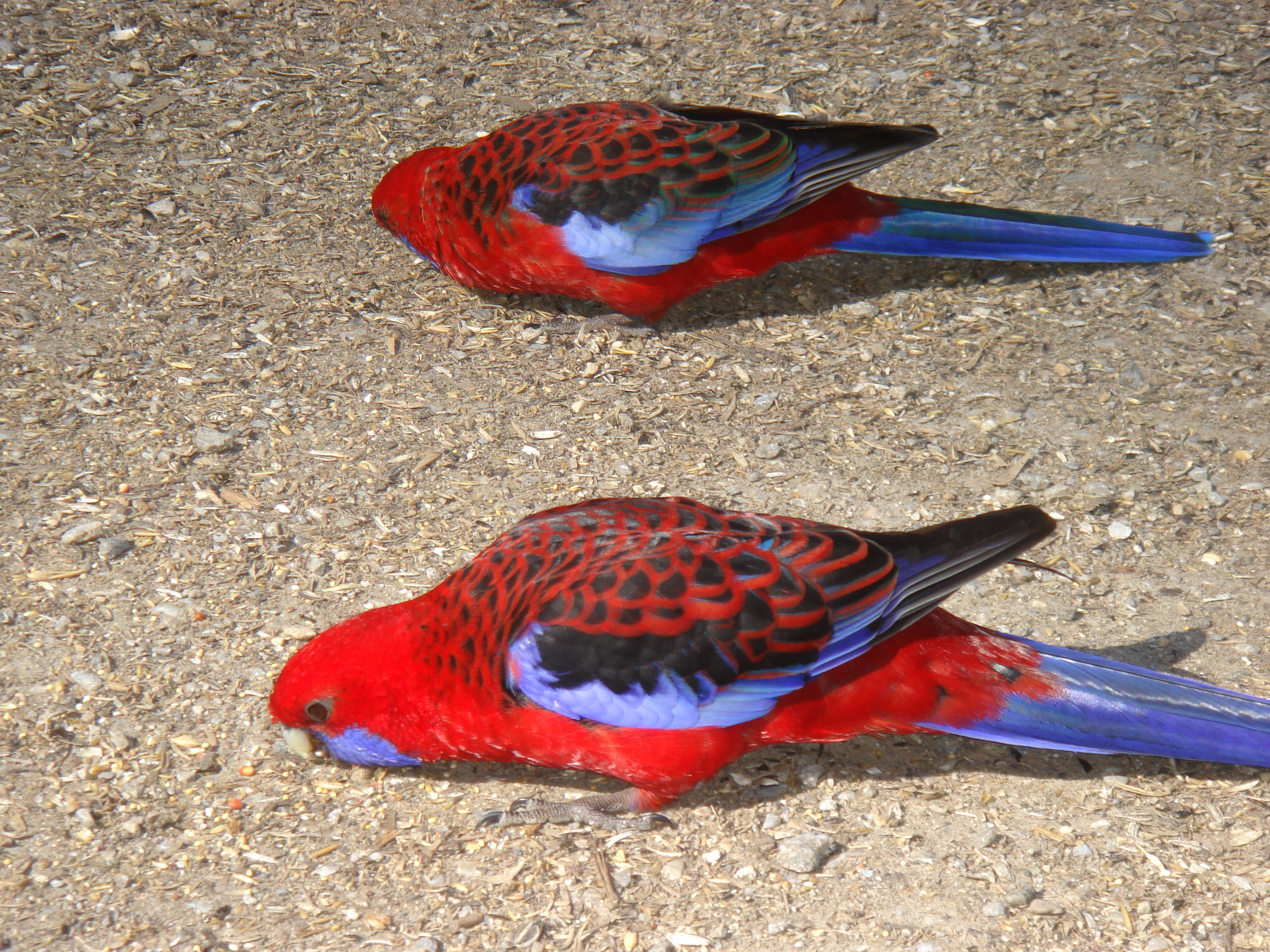
Eating seeds from the ground. The feathers on the back have a scalloped pattern.

The Adelaide rosella of Adelaide and the surrounding area was also thought to be a separate species, but is presently believed to be a hybrid swarm, having originated through interbreeding of the crimson and yellow rosellas. Both of these still interbreed with the Adelaide rosella where its range crosses theirs, and it exhibits variation in its plumage from dark orange-red in the south of its distribution to a pale orange-yellow in the north. Variants that are very close to the yellow race are designated subadelaidae.

== Distribution and habitat ==
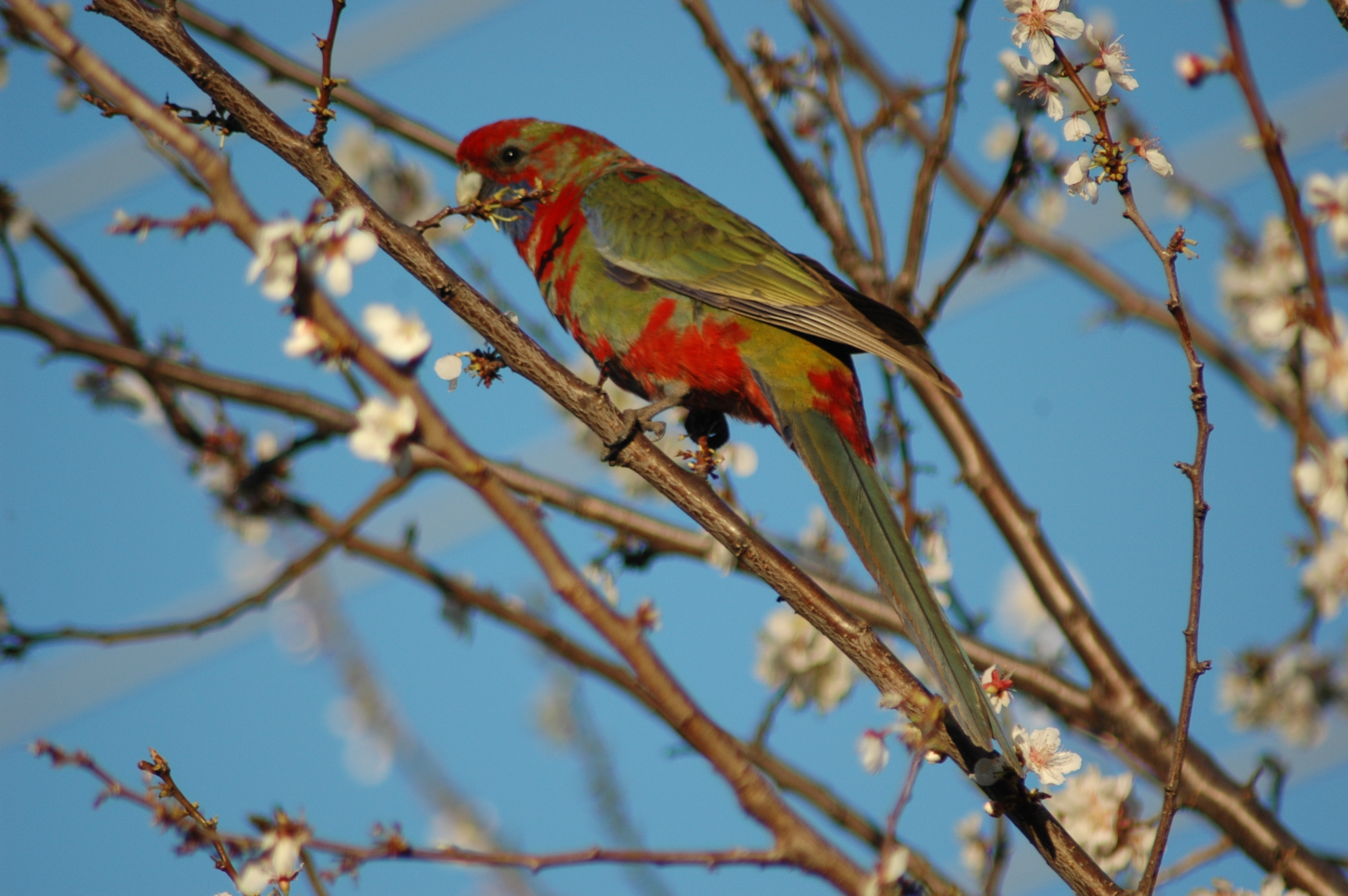
Juvenile with prominent green plumage

The crimson rosella occurs from southeastern South Australia, through Tasmania, Victoria and coastal New South Wales into southeastern Queensland. A disparate population occurs in North Queensland.

Around 1910, a small number of crimson rosellas were released off the Otago Heads, New Zealand, along with eastern rosellas. These interbred and by the 1950s no pure crimson rosellas remained. This mixed population has remained there ever since. Crimson rosellas were also present in Wellington City from 1963 through the early 1990s as an introduced species. Two crimson rosellas were also recorded from the Tararua foothills in 1971. It is now thought to be extinct in the wild in New Zealand.

Crimson rosellas were taken to Norfolk Island as cage birds during the first penal settlement. Escaping into the wild, they were reported before 1838, and became numerous by 1900. There they are often known as "red parrots", to distinguish them from the native Norfolk Island parakeet or "green parrots".

Crimson rosellas are common in coastal and mountain forests at all altitudes. They primarily live in forests and woodlands, preferring older and wetter forests. They can be found in tropical, subtropical, and temperate rainforests, both wet and dry sclerophyll forests, riparian forests, and woodlands, all the way from sea level up to the tree line. They will also live in human-affected areas such as farmlands, pastures, fire-breaks, parks, reserves, gardens, and golf-courses. They are rarely found in treeless areas. At night, they roost on high tree branches.

== Behaviour ==
Almost all rosellas are sedentary, although occasional populations are considered nomadic; no rosellas are migratory. Outside of the breeding season, crimson rosellas tend to congregate in pairs or small groups and feeding parties. The largest groups are usually composed of juveniles, who will gather in flocks of up to 20 individuals. When they forage, they are conspicuous and chatter noisily. Rosellas are monogamous, and during the breeding season, adult birds will not congregate in groups and will only forage with their mate.

According to a new study crimson rosellas can identify birds of their own subspecies based on the smell of other birds.

=== Feeding ===
Adult eating seeds from a basil plant in a garden in Canberra, Australia

Crimson rosellas forage in trees, bushes, and on the ground for the fruit, seeds, nectar, berries, and nuts of a wide variety of plants, including members of the Myrtaceae, Asteraceae, and Rosaceae families. Despite feeding on fruits and seeds, rosellas are not useful to the plants as seed-spreaders, because they crush and destroy the seeds in the process of eating them. Their diet often puts them at odds with farmers whose fruit and grain harvests can be damaged by the birds, which has resulted in large numbers of rosellas being shot in the past. Adelaide rosellas are known to feed on dormant cherry flower buds. Rosellas will also eat many insects and their larvae, including termites, aphids, beetles, weevils, caterpillars, moths, and water boatmen.

=== Breeding ===
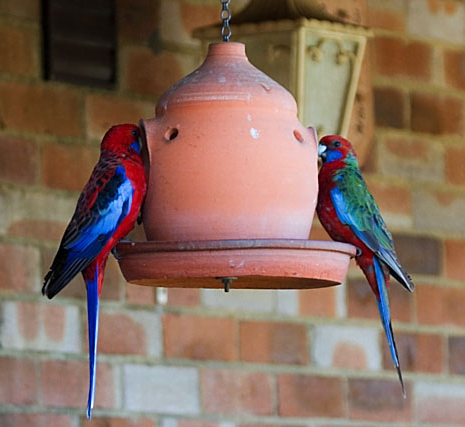
Adult on the left and juvenile on the right. The juvenile retains some green plumage on the wings.

Nesting sites are hollows greater than 1 metre (3.3 feet) deep in tree trunks, limbs, and stumps. These may be up to 30 metres (98 feet) above the ground. The nesting site is selected by the female. Once the site is selected, the pair will prepare it by lining it with wood debris made from the hollow itself by gnawing and shredding it with their beaks. They do not bring in material from outside the hollow. Only one pair will nest in a particular tree. A pair will guard their nest by perching near it and chattering at other rosellas that approach. They will also guard a buffer zone of several trees radius around their nest, preventing other pairs from nesting in that area.

The breeding season of the crimson rosella lasts from September through to February, and varies depending on the rainfall of each year; it starts earlier and lasts longer during wet years. The laying period is on average during mid- to late October. Clutch size ranges from 3–8 eggs, which are laid asynchronously at an average interval of 2.1 days; the eggs are white and slightly shiny and measure 28 by 23 millimetres (1 1/8 in × 7/8 in). The mean incubation period is 19.7 days, and ranges from 16 to 28 days. Only the mother incubates the eggs. The eggs hatch around mid-December; on average 3.6 eggs successfully hatch. There is a bias towards female nestlings, as 41.8% of young are male. For the first six days, only the mother feeds the nestlings. After this time, both parents feed them. The young become independent in February, after which they spend a few more weeks with their parents before departing to become part of a flock of juveniles. Juveniles reach maturity (gain adult plumage) at 16 months of age.

=== Mutations ===
The nominate bird is mainly red, and a few colour mutations exist, such as the blue, yellow, white, and cinnamon, in aviculture.

== Threats ==
Predators of crimson rosellas include the peregrine falcon, grey goshawk and powerful owl, as well as feral cats and foxes. Possums and currawongs are also believed to occasionally take eggs from the nest. Surprisingly, however, the crimson rosella is its own worst enemy. During the breeding season, it is common for females to fly to other nests and destroy the eggs and in fact, this is the most common cause for an egg failing to hatch. This behaviour is thought to be a function of competition for suitable nesting hollows, since a nest will be abandoned if all the eggs in it are destroyed, and a pair of rosellas will tend to nest in the same area from year to year.

A new study has shown that hybrid birds were more likely to fight off diseases than were pure breeds; an example of the biological phenomenon of heterosis, in which a crossbreed is stronger than its two purebred ancestors. Scientists from the Centre for Integrative Ecology at Deakin University in Geelong, Victoria, studied the infection patterns of beak and feather diseases in crimson rosellas across southern Australia. This included several hybrid populations in northeastern Victoria and southern New South Wales, located in between the range of the two parent subspecies. (Platycercus elegans flaveolus and P. elegans elegans). They found that when the subspecies mated, the resulting offspring seemed to cope better with a potentially deadly virus.
