= History of books in Brazil =

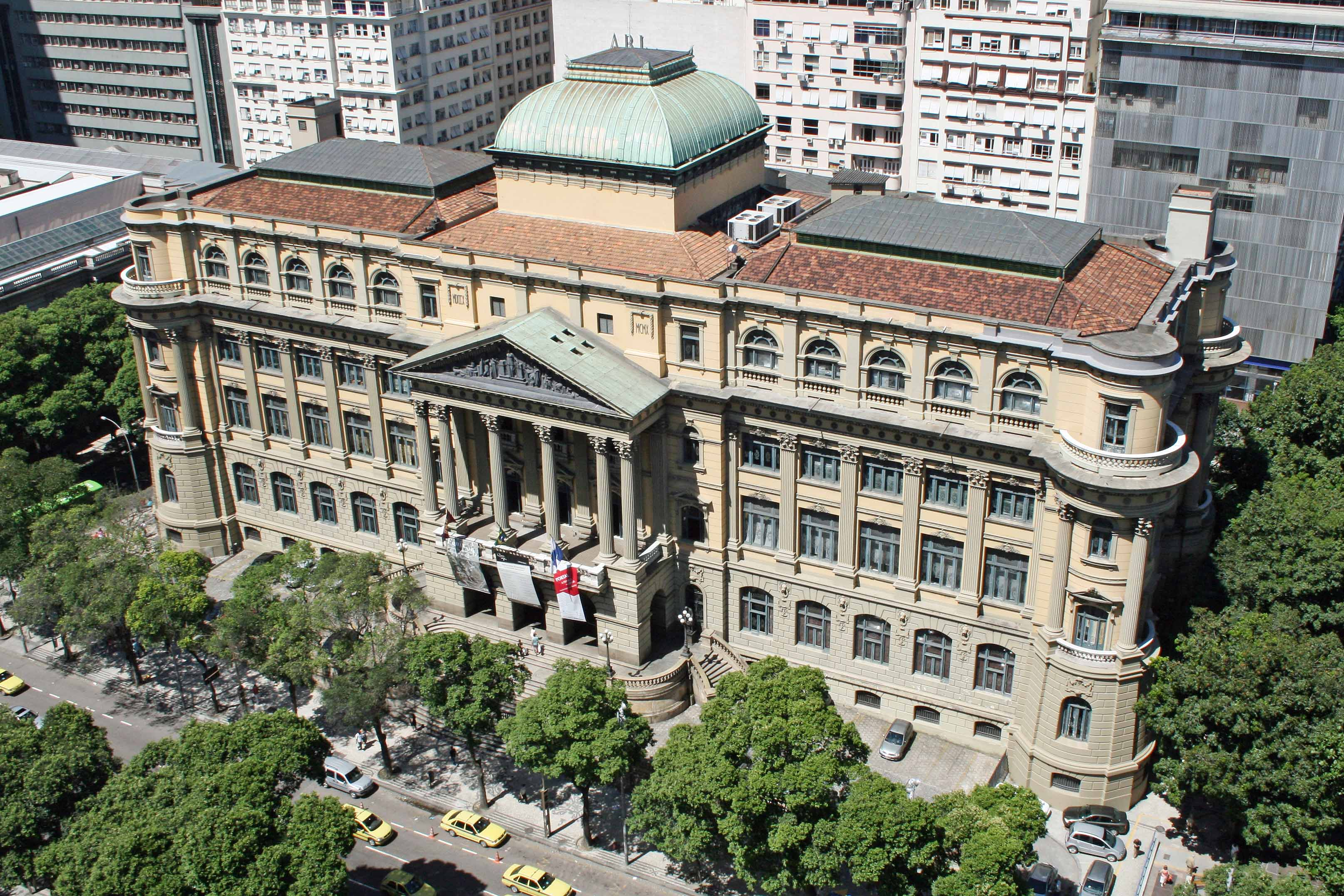
Biblioteca Nacional, situated in Rio de Janeiro, the depository of the bibliographic and document-based heritage of Brazil.

The history of the book in Brazil focuses on the development of the access to publishing resources and acquisition of the book in the country, covering a period extending from the beginning of the editorial activity during colonization to today's publishing market, including the history of publishing and bookstores that allowed the modern accessibility to the book.

== Colonial Period ==
It is believed that printing was only introduced by the settlers and colonisers in the colonies, which had a highly developed indigenous culture that the colonial power wanted to supplant or suppress. This idea is supported by the Brazilian historian Nelson Werneck Sodré and others. Printing, in the first two centuries of Portuguese and Spanish colonization, was in part a result of Christian evangelization. It was deployed through religious initiative, so that its production was destined to meet the clergy's needs and that of the missions.

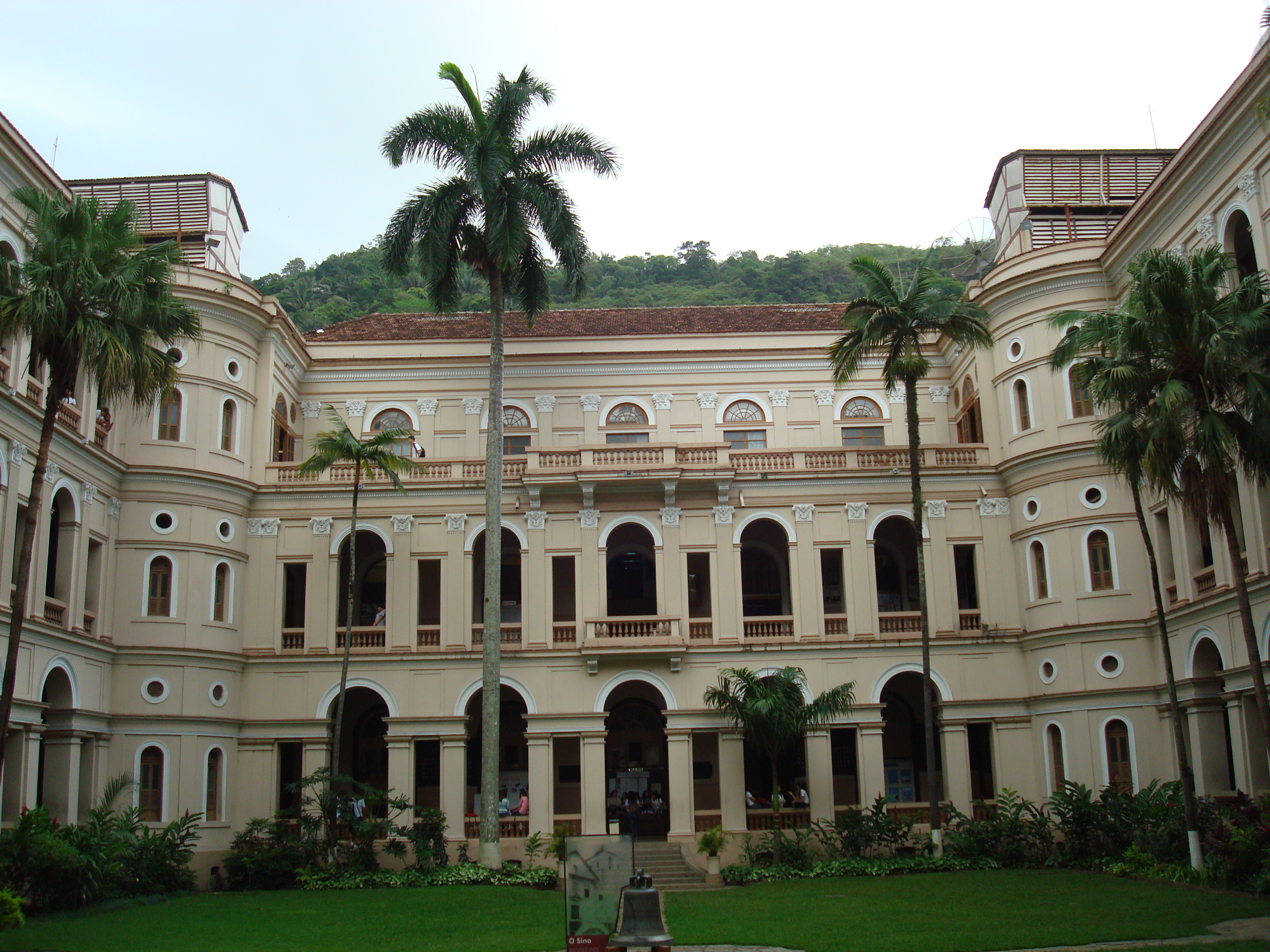
Colégio Santo Inácio (St. Ignatius College) is believed to have crafted the first printed works in Brazil, in 1724.

"História da Companhia de Jesus no Brasil", by Serafim Leite, says that the library of Colégio Santo Inácio, in O Morro do Castelo, Rio de Janeiro. (This was a landform that existed in the city of Rio, the hill being one of the foundation points of the city in the sixteenth century and which housed landmarks of great importance, such as colonial forts and buildings of the Jesuits. Nevertheless, it was destroyed in an urban reform in 1922.) This centre is believed to have undertaken some printed jobs around 1724, the accuracy of the claim not be ascertained. It could be referring to two books of the time, "Vocabulário de la lengua guarany", by Antônio Luiz Restrepo (1722), and "Arte de la lengua guarany", which were printed in a region that is currently part of Brazil, but which at the time belonged to Paraguay, Pueblo de Santa Maria la Mayor.

In most colonies, the necessities of governance made it an imperative to accept printing, and only in Portuguese Latin America did the administration remained so elementary that this need was dispensed with. This need only become imminent when the government of the colony suffered the impact of the Napoleonic invasion, a few years later.

The first attempt to introduce effective printing into Brazil was made by the Dutch, during the period of their occupation of northeastern Brazil, between 1630 and 1650.

During the Dutch occupation, negotiations between Pernambuco and the Netherlands resulted in the selection of a printer, Janszonon Pieter, to be in charge of printing in Recife, but he died as soon as he arrived in Brazil on 3 August 1643. Two years later, the Dutch West Indies Company was still looking out for a printer without success. At the time, Maurice of Nassau had already left, and the pressured Dutch no longer gave priority to the subject.

== The start of publishing activity ==
About 60 years later, Recife had the first printer of Brazil according to historians Ferreira de Carvalho and Pereira da Costa, but the identity of the printer is not known. Serafim Leite, in "Arts and Workshops of the Jesuits in Brazil,", says the printer worked from 1703 to 1706, and argues that the typesetter was a Jesuit, Antonio da Costa, but there is no proof, however, the existence of such a printer.

In Rio de Janeiro, in 1747, there is definitive evidence is available that there was a printer, via leaflets printed at the time. The printer was Antonio Isidoro da Fonseca, a recognized typographer of Lisbon, who had sold his business and come to [Brazil]. Isidoro had problems in Lisbon, with the Inquisition, being considered as "The Jew" editor. Antonio Jose da Silva, of Rio, was born in 1705 from a family of converted Jews, and that turned out to be burned later in an auto de fé of the Inquisition on 19 October 1739. At the time, the governor of [Rio de Janeiro] and [Minas Gerais], Gomes Freire de Andrade, was interested in stimulating the intellectual life of the city of Rio de Janeiro. He encouraged the creation of Academia dos felizes in 1736, which became the Academia dos Selectos in 1752, which met at the Palácio do Governo itself. It was also at this time that Ângela do Amaral Rangel became the first and only woman to participate in this academy. Concrete proof of the existence of printing was a leaflet, 1747, whose authorship is attributed to Luiz Antonio Rosado, and a so-called volume "Hoc est Conclusiones real entity Metaphysicae, praeside RGM Francisco de Faria" in 1747. There are two other works, referring to bishop [Antonio do Desterro Malheyro]. As soon as the news reached Lisbon, however, there was order to close the letterpress, because printing in the colony was not considered appropriate at the time.

Isidoro returned to Portugal, and, after three years, requested a royal license to reinstate himself as a printer in the colony, in Rio de Janeiro or Salvador, promising never to print without the appropriate civil and ecclesiastical licenses. The request was rejected

Portugal's prohibition of printing in Brazil was the factor that made all Brazilian documents to get to be published in Europe or to remain in the form of manuscripts. There are several papers written by Brazilians and printed in Portugal at the time, including the poetry of Claudio Manuel da Costa, the work of José de Santa Rita Durão, Jose Basilio da Gama (author of "Uruguay", 1769), Tomas Antonio Gonzaga (whose work Marília de Dirceu was published in four editions in Lisbon between 1792 and 1800).

In 1792, there were only two bookstores in Rio de Janeiro, and possibly one of these was run by Paul Martim, a native of Tours (in France) and the first Rio bookseller. His son, Paul Martim Filho kept the bookstore running until 1823. The books offered were usually pertaining to medicine or religion, and most of the books that arrived in Brazil at the time were smuggled in.

== Arrival of the royal family in Brazil ==
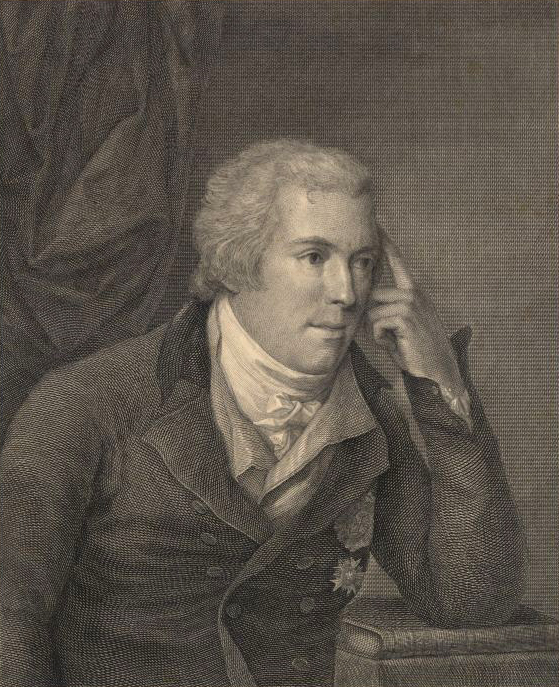
António de Araújo e Azevedo, Count of Barca, who had installed the first printing press in Brazil in his own home, in Rio de Janeiro.

In 1808, when the royal family, under pressure from Napoleon's invasion, moved to Brazil, it took with them 60,000 volumes of the Royal Library. Installed in the new capital, Rio de Janeiro, Dom João VI and his ministers created, among other developments, the Royal Library, now the National Library (Biblioteca Nacional), which was established in 1810. The impact of this development caused an increase in the number of bookstores, with two existing in 1808 (those of Paul Martin and Manuel Jorge da Silva) growing to five in 1809 (in addition to the above, those run by Francisco Luiz Saturnino da Veiga, Manuel Mandillo—which after 1814 was associated with José Norges Pine—and João Roberto Bourgeois); seven in 1812 (in addition to the previous, Manuel Joaquim da Silva Porto—which in 1815 was associated with Pedro Antonio Campos Bellos—and Jose Antonio da Silva); 12 in 1816 (the additional ones being those of Fernando José Pinheiro, Jeronimo Gonçalves Guimarães, Francisco José Nicolau Mandillo, Joao Batista dos Santos), and in 1818, 3 more (Antonio Joaquim da Silva Garcez, João Lopes de Oliveira Guimarães and Manuel Monteiro Trindade Coelho). The newspaper Correio Braziliense", run by Hipólito José da Costa Pereira Furtado de Mendonça, was produced in England. In Paris, there was a development of the publishing trade in Portuguese, that would last a long time, almost until 1930.

There is disagreement over whether or not a printing press existed in Brazil on the occasion of the arrival of the royal family. Reportedly, a press with movable type was finally brought to Brazil by the government itself, which had earlier been forbidden so vehemently. António de Araújo e Azevedo, then Foreign Minister and later Count of Barca, brought and had installed the press in Rio de Janeiro, on the ground floor of his own home, 44 Rua do Passeio. Brother José Mariano da Conceição Veloso, a miner religious who had been to Lisbon in 1790, returned to Brazil with the royal family to work in the press of Rio, the Imprensa Régia. The new press was launched on May 13, 1808, with the publication of a 27 page booklet, accompanied by the royal charter. In the 14 years of the printing monopoly in Rio over a thousand items were produced.

== Publishing in the province ==
- Minas Gerais

The first book printed in the province was in Vila Rica, Minas Gerais, later Ouro Preto, in 1807, before the rise of the Royal Press (Imprensa Régia). Governor Athayde de Mello, the future Earl of Condeixa, was so pleased with a poem in his honor by Diogo de Vasconcelos, who wished to see it printed. This impression was made by Father José Joaquim Viegas de Menezes, in a small press for domestic purposes. Associated with the Portuguese Manuel José Barbosa Pimenta e Sal, he gradually set up the "Typographia Patriota de Barbosa & Cia", which was completed in 1821.

After 1807, the first books printed in Ouro Preto were a collection of "Laws of the Empire of Brazil" (Leis do Império do Brasil) in 1835 by a printer called Silva, and the "Dictionary of the Brazilian language" (Diccionario da Língua Brasileira), by Luis Maria da Silva Pinto in 1832. Later, other printing houses emerged in São João del Rei (1827), Diamantina (1828) and Marian (1830).

- Bahia

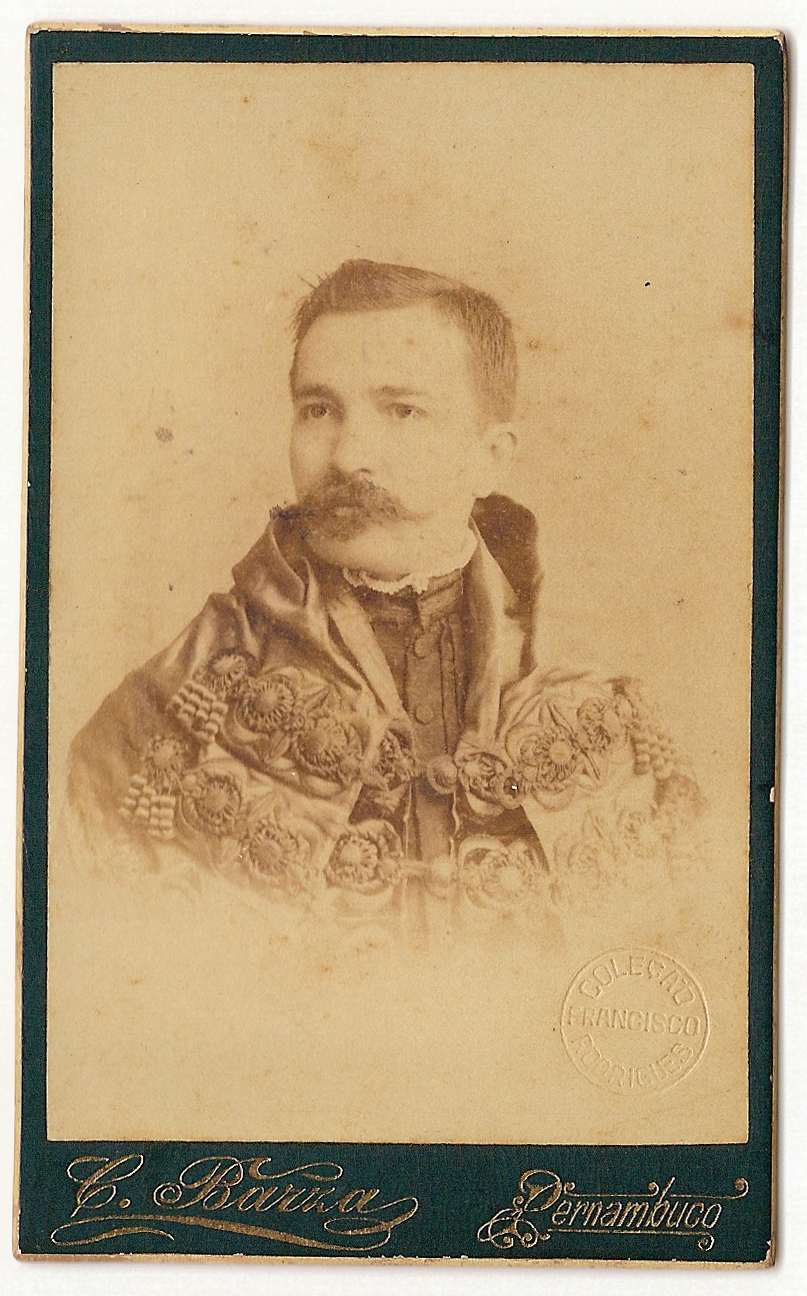
Clóvis Bevilaqua, owner of J. L. da Fonseca bookshop, of the School of Law in Recife between the years 1891 and 1895. Photograph by Alberto Henschel.

In Bahia, as soon as the royal family came to Brazil, a bookseller from Salvador, Manuel Antonio da Silva Serva, a native of Portugal, asked permission to go to England and get a printer to Bahia; such permission was granted in 1809, and began printing in 1811. One might speculate that there were two printers at that time. Serva died in 1819, and the press continued with his partner and son-in-law José Teixeira and Carvalho, becoming known as "Typographia da Viúva Serva, e Carvalho." Later, his son Manuel started working at the firm. The publication known as Silva Serva had 176 titles, and the publisher survived with several name changes until 1846, but lost its monopoly position in 1823. During the struggle for independence in Brazil, the troops of the joint pro-Portugal junta invaded "Typographia da Viúva Serva" to stop the publication of the nationalist newspaper "Constitucional". Its editors fled to Cachoeira, where they installed their own graphics to continue printing the weekly "O Independente Constitucional". The Serva press continued producing the Gazeta da Bahia, which was pro-Portugal, but when the nationalist cause triumphed in June 1823, its publication had to be stopped.

With the death of Silva Serva, Bahia's literary production went into decline, only recovering in the 1890s. Standing out, at the time, were "Livraria J. L. da Fonseca Magalhães, editores", of the lawyer Clovis Bevilacqua between 1895 and 1910, and Livraria Catilina, founded by Carlos Pongetti on February 2, 1835, and which lasted until 1960, when it became the oldest bookstore in Brazil. In 1864, Sierra Teriga took over its direction, passing it to Xavier Catiline in 1877. The Catilina was a retail house, but had an impressive editorial stint, under the Romualdo dos Santos, and published works of Castro Alves, Coelho Neto, Ruy Barbosa, Xavier Marques, and Ernesto Carneiro Ribeiro. The actual printing, however, was usually undertaken in Portugal or other European countries, as was customary at the time.

- Maranhão

Maranhão was one of the first provinces to have a printing press. It was one of the most prosperous of the empire, due to the production of cotton, which held value since the invention of Cartwright loom in 1787. During this period of development, there was a golden age cultural and intellectual activity in the region, under the influence of the Portuguese elite. The golden age of literature begins with the appearance of the first of Gonçalves Dias poems, in the 1840s, and goes on to the departure of Aluísio Azevedo to Rio de Janeiro, in the early 1880. Two printers stand out at this time: Belarmino de Mattos and José Maria Corrêa de Frias.

Printing was introduced in Maranhão in 1821, by the governor of Bernardo Silveira Pinto da Fonseca, when he installed an official printer to produce the government newspaper Conciliador do Maranhão. A pre "Columbian", the most modern of the time, was brought in from Lisbon, and then converted into the "Typographia Nacional Maranhense" later called "Typographia Nacional Imperial".

The first privately owned printer in Maranhão was Ricardo Antonio Rodrigues de Araújo, whose enterprise existed from 1822 until the 1850s, and "Typographia Melandiana" of Daniel G. de Melo, who produced his first job in 1825. Most important, however, was the "Typographia Constitucional" of Clementino José Lisboa, which began in 1830. Others were the "Ignacio Jose Ferreira", founded in 1833 by João Francisco Lisboa and Frederico Magno d'Abranches; the "J. G. Magalhães Pereira e Manuel Ramos "; the "Typographia Temperança" of Francisco de Sales Nines Cascais; the "Typographia Monárquica Constitucional" which was sold in 1848 to Fábio Alexandrino de Carvalho Reis, Theophilus A. de Carvalho Leal and A. Rego, and would produce "O Progresso", the first daily newspaper of Maranhão, started in 1847.

Matos Belarmino has been considered by many historians as one of the best printers that Brazil has ever had. He created a union, the "Associação Typographica Maranhense", inaugurated on 11 May 1857, one of the first organizations of Brazil's workers outside of Rio de Janeiro (it was preceded, in Rio de Janeiro, by the "Imperial Associação Typographica Fluminense", founded on December 25, 1853).

- Pernambuco

In Pernambuco, Recife had the first typography, the "Oficina Tipográfica da República restaurada de Pernambuco" in 1817, which was soon closed by the government for political reasons. In 1820, governor Luís do Rego Barreto ordered the building of a "screw press", the traditional model, in the local arsenal, or on the train, then becoming known as "Officina do Trem de Pernambuco", and the design of French teacher Jean-Paul Adour, was appointed to run it. When Rego was dismissed, it came to be called "Officina do Trem Nacional" in 1821 and then "Typographia Nacional". Also in Recife was the competitor Manuel Clemente do Rego Cavalcante, who settled with newly brought equipment from Portugal, associating with Felipe Mena Calado da Fonseca and the Englishman James Prinches; former priest and Portuguese professor Antônio José de Miranda Falcão learned the art of typography. In addition to these, two other printers were "Typographia Fidedigna" run by Manuel Zeferino dos Santos, from 1827 to 1840, and Typographia do Cruzeiro, which began in 1829.

In Olinda, Manuel Figueroa de Faria opened in mid-1831, the "Pinheiro Faria e Companhia", which moved then to Recife, and that may have been responsible for the first books of Pernambuco; it published the "Diário de Pernambuco", having bought their rights of Antonio José de Miranda Falcão, in 1835. At the time, there were 14 printers and 4 lithographic establishments in Recife. One of the most important was the "União" of Santos e Cia., founded in 1836 by the priest Ignacio Francisco dos Santos.

Perhaps the most interesting publication of Pernambuco, at the time, was the work of Nísia Floresta (the pseudonym of Dionysia Gonçalves Pinto), "Direitos das Mulheres e Injustiças do Homens". This was a free adaptation of the work A Vindication of the Rights of Woman, authored by feminist Mary Wollstonecraft Godwin in 1792.

Other printers of note are the Canon Marcelino Pacheco Amaral, who installed a printing press in his own house, only to publish his "Compendio de theologia moral (Compendium of moral theology)" in three volumes produced between 1888 and 1890, and then sold his "Imprensa Econômica" to a local publisher, Tobias Barreto, in 1847. He founded in Escada, in the interior of Pernambuco, the "Typographia Constitucional", which lasted until 1888.

- Paraíba

In Paraiba, the "Typographia Nacional da Paraíba" stands out. It printed the first provincial newspaper.

- Pará

In Pará, the printer João Francisco Madureira manufactured his own press. Already in 1822, the Liberal Press published the first newspaper of Pará, and the fifth in Brazil, "O Paraense", by the master printer Daniel Garção de Melo. The "Typographia de Santos e Menor" of Honorio José dos Santos, gave the first important publication, "Ensaio corográfico sobre a província do Pará", by António Ladislau Monteiro Baena. Then the press changed the name to "Santos e Filhos (Santos and Sons)" and later, "Santos e Irmão (Santos and Brother)."

- In the other provinces

After Pará, the picture that emerged in terms of the arrival of the press in the provinces is as follows: Ceará in 1824, São Paulo in February 1827, Rio Grande do Sul in June 1827, Goiás in 1830, Santa Catarina in 1831, Alagoas in 1831, Sergipe in 1832, Rio Grande do Norte in 1832, the Espírito Santo in 1840, Paraná in 1853 (Rizzini argues that it was in 1849), Amazonas in 1854, Piaui in 1832, Mato Grosso in 1840

== Publishing in Rio de Janeiro ==
The new Portuguese constitution, adopted on 15–16 February 1821, abolished censorship, and soon Brazil saw a flood of publications emerging. Also ended was the monopoly of the government press. In 1821, the installation of "Nova Officina Typographica" by private owners was allowed, followed by "Typographia de Moreira e Garcez" in Rio de Janeiro. On the eve of the Independence of Brazil, the city already had about seven printing establishments. Manuel Joaquim da Silva Porto, poet and bookseller, who had introduced in Brazil the dramatic tragedy Phèdre, by the French dramatist, one of the three great playwrights of 17th-century France, Jean Racine, and was a printer the Royal Press, started his "Officina de Silva Porto e Cia.", along with Felizardo Joaquim da Silva Moraes, making this the first bookseller in the city to have its own printing press.

The writer Victoriano José dos Santos and Silva set up the "Officina dos Anais Fluminenses" (Officina of Fluminenses Proceedings; there was also the modern "Typographia Astréia", which printed a newspaper with the same name, and the firm "Torres e Costa: Innocêncio Francisco Torres e Vicente Justiniano da Costa", which was soon replaced by "Typographia Innocencio Francisco Torres e Companhia." By along with the number of printing presses, there was also an increase in the number of bookstores in Rio de Janeiro.

In 1823, Paulo Martim Filho, who had moved to the Rua dos Pescadores, No. 14, was best known bookseller in Rio de Janeiro. Silva Porto, at Rua da Quitanda, was second in importance, but in all there were 11 other bookstores, and one of them was that of Francisco Luiz Saturnino da Veiga. To remarry, Francisco donated the dowry of his deceased wife to the older children, João Pedro Ferreira da Veiga and Evaristo da Veiga, who entered on their own into the book market, buying the establishment of Silva Porto.

The predominance of Rio de Janeiro in the literary market began in the 1840s and continued until 1880, despite the attempt of other provincial cities, such as the Casa Garraux, the famed bookstore of São Paulo, which had at the time 400 printed works in the province i.e. 11% of all the titles in the country.

Also noteworthy is the "Casa do Livro Azul" ("Blue Book House"), at Rua do Ouvidor, which ran from 1828 to 1852; its owner, Albino Jourdan, lost his sight and hearing and was helped by two assistants, aged 14 and 17 years.

- Pierre Plancher

Pierre René Constant Plancher de la Noah, became an official printer in France in 1798. After numerous political problems with the French government, went to Rio de Janeiro in 1824, and while waiting for the Customs to release their equipment, opened his provisional shop at 60, Rua dos Ourives, in March 1824. In June of that year, he moved to the Rua do Ouvidor, initially at No. 80, then No. 95, and soon began to publish in Portuguese. Much of his publications were administrative. Among his many publications, highlights included the "Annuario Histórico Brasiliense" in 1824, the year in an almanac, "Folhinhas de Algibeira e de Porta", and in 1827, the "Almanack Plancher."

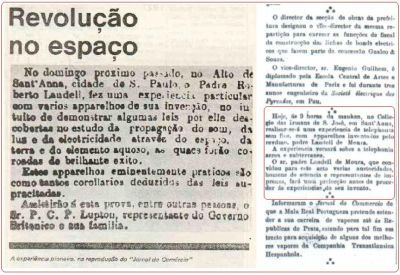
Jornal do Commercio, of June 10, 1900.

Plancher published the first Brazilian soap opera, "Statira a Zoroastes" by Lucas Jose Alvarenga, in 1826, comprising 58 pages. Previously, Paul Martin published some novels, but these were translated from French. Plancher published the journal "Spectador Brasileiro", a newspaper that lasted until May 23, 1827. He later acquired the "Diário Mercantil", from Francisco Manuel Ferreira and Company, and changed its name to Jornal do Commercio, which became the oldest in the city of Rio from January. It is assigned to the new Plancher printing process known as lithography, which was invented in 1798 and only began to become widespread in 1815, replacing the recording on metal plates.

The printer working for Plancher was Hercule Florence, who gave up the post to follow a journey of exploration and anthropology with Baron Langsdorff. The first printer in Brazil, therefore, became Armand Marie Julien Pallière, who worked a while for the Military Archives in 1819, and was replaced by Johann Jacob Steinmann, who arrived in Rio de Janeiro in 1825 and some years later returned to Switzerland, where he published his collection of printed views, "Souvenirs of Rio de Janeiro".

Thanks to the apprentices of Steinmann, in 1846 Rio de Janeiro had four lithography printers. The oldest was that of Luis Aleixo Boulanger, founded on August 15, 1829, and the most important was the firm "Ludwig e Briggs", which existed between 1843 and 1877. The main competitor of Briggs was "Heaton e Rensburg" founded in 1840 (by Englishman George Mathia Heaton and the Dutchman Eduard Rensburg), whose main feature was the publication of music.

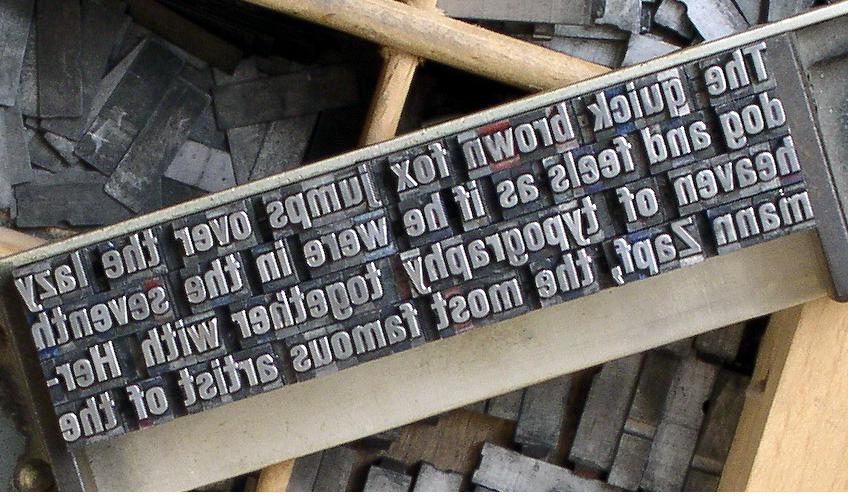
Moveable type on a linotype.

After the abdication of D. Pedro I, in 1832, the book trade suffered the economic effects of political uncertainty, and Plancher sold his firm to two countrymen on 9 June 1832. The buyers were Junio Constancio de Villeneuve and Réol- Antoine Mougenot, and July 15, 1834, Mougenot sold his share to Villeneuve, who has owned the first mechanical press in the southern hemisphere, after the first rotary and first Linotype. Its competitors were the "Typographia Nacional", "Paula Brito", "Laemmert", the "Typographia do Diário", and the printers Correio Mercantil and Correio da Tarde. At the time, two of the oldest registered Brazilian novels were produced: "O Aniversário de D. Miguel em 1828" by J. M. Pereira da Silva in 1838, and "Os Assassinos Misteriosos (The Mysterious Assassins)", by Justiniano José da Rocha, in 1839.

- Louis Mongie

Louis Mongie had a major bookstore at Ouvidor Street, from 1832 until 1853, the year of his death, at which time the bookstore was transferred to "Pinto & Waldemar", which became, around 1860, "F. L. Pinto & Cia., "And then to "J. Barboza e Irmão"- all of whom called themselves, however, "Imperial Library ".

- Paula Brito

In 1831, Francisco de Paula Brito, who came from a humble family and learned to read from his sister, bought a small property of their relative Sílvio José de Almeida Brito, in Praça da Constituição (Constitution Square), No. 51. It was a stationery and bindery, besides selling tea. Brito installed a small printing press there, which he had purchased from E. C. dos Santos, and in the year 1833, Brito already had two establishments: the "Typographia Fluminense", the Rua da Constituição, 51, and "Typographia Imparcial" on No. 44; in 1837, he moved to No. 66 and expanded the store to number 64 in 1939. In 1848, Brito already had six manual printers and mechanics, and expanded its facilities to No. 68 and 78, a "corner shop" which became his bookstore and stationery outlet. He created branches in partnership with Antonio Goncalves Teixeira e Sousa and Candido Lopes, forming with the latter the "Tipografia e Loja de Lopes e Cia", in Niterói. Cândido Lopes would become later the first printer of Paraná.

In his shop, Francisco de Paula Brito created the "Sociedade Petalógica" which had such a name because of the "freedom" Brito said that its members give to the imagination (a peta = a lie), and gathered together all the members of the Romantic movement of 1840–1860: Antonio Goncalves Dias, Laurindo Rabelo, Joaquim Manuel de Macedo, Manuel Antonio de Almeida, among others. All the elite of the time, among the politicians, artists and leaders, gathered at the "Paula Brito Bookstore."

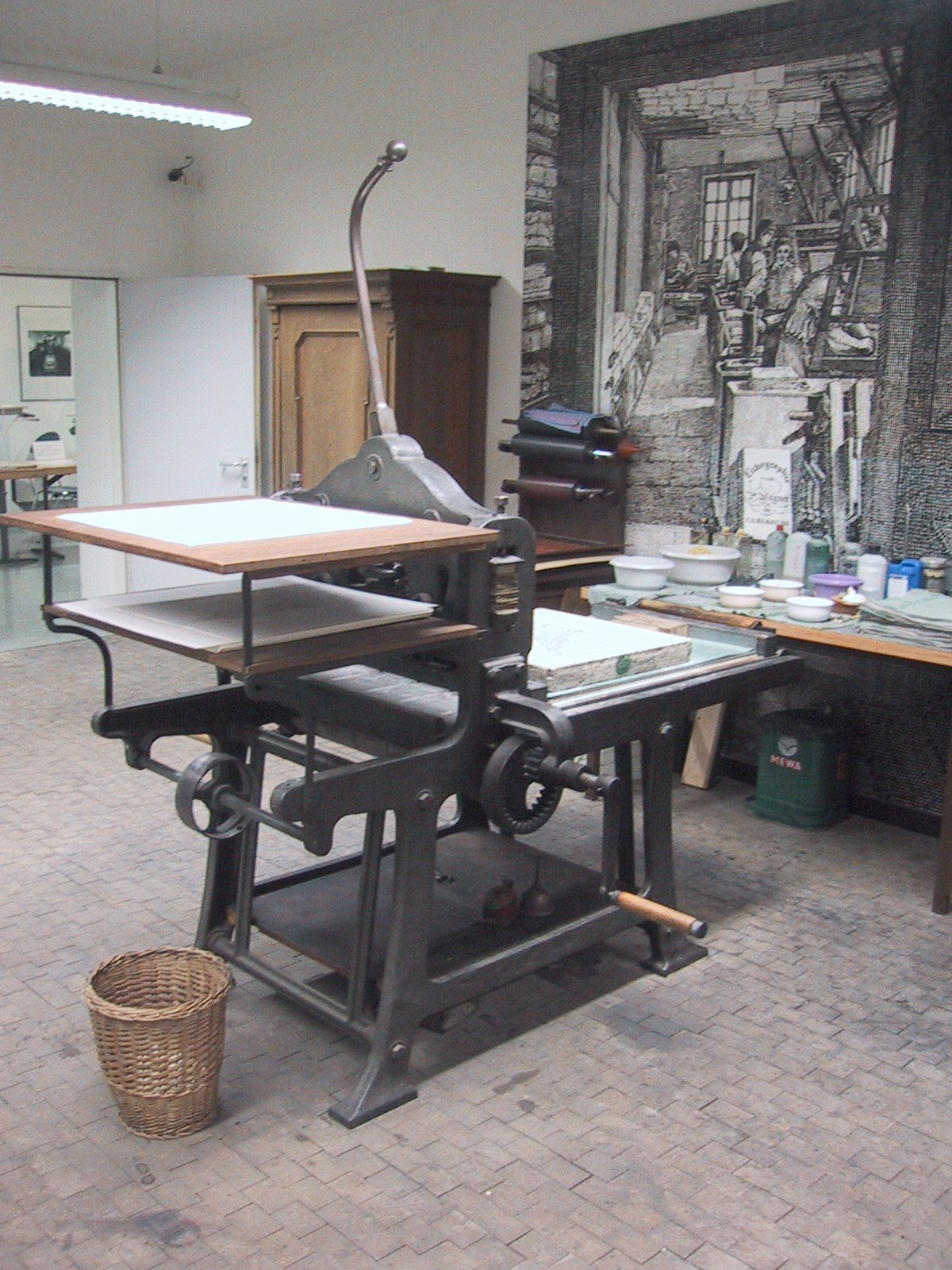
A lithographic press.

In 1851, Brito entered the field of lithography; one of his magazines, "A Marmota na Corte (The Marmots in the Court)", included a costume. Brito brought the Paris lithographer Louis Thérier, who became the lithographer for the magazine. Created on December 2, 1850, the new "Imperial Typographia Dous de Dezembro", its name marking the anniversary date of Dom Pedro II, who became its shareholder. Paula Brito was the first non-specialized genuine editor of the country, which came up with a wide variety of works and subjects, unlike their predecessors, who were devoted to more technical matters.

Paula Brito edited the country's first women's magazine in 1832, "A Mulher do Simplício" or "A Fluminense Exaltada", which was printed by Plancher, his friend. The magazine lasted until 1846, when it was replaced by "A Marmota (The Woodchuck)", which lasted, with some title changes, from 1849 to 1864, three years after his death.

There are reports of 372 non-periodical publications made by Paula Brito, on quite varied themes, and of those, 83 were in the medical field, usually theses, but most constituted dramas. Brito encouraged the growth of the national literature, still precarious. It can be considered the first Brazilian novel with some literary value has been "O Filho do Pescador (The Fisherman's Son)", by Antonio Goncalves Teixeira e Sousa, published by Brito in 1843. He used the poet Casimiro de Abreu and the young Machado de Assis, who began as a proofreader of Paula Brito and began the literary career as a collaborator of "A Marmota Fluminense".

In early 1857, dissatisfied shareholders oversaw the liquidation of "Typographia Dous de Dezembro." His firm was reduced to "Typographia de Paula Brito", with only one address, even that thanks to the financial support of the emperor. The publication of books fell, dropping to 12 in 1858 and 15 in 1861, the year of his death. His widow continued the business in partnership with their son in law until 1867, amidst falling production. In 1868 Mrs. Rufina Rodrigues da Costa Brito was alone, transferring the business to Rua do Sacramento, nº 10, which survived until 1875.

- Garnier

Among the various bookstores in Rio de Janeiro, at Rua do Ouvidor, while some were owned by Frenchmen, such as Plancher and Villeneuve, others were other branches of existing companies in France such as Mongie, Aillaud and Bossange. Prominent among these the Brothers Firmin Didot, but in order of importance, the most prominent was the Garnier Frères, who worked in Brazil from 1844 to 1934.

The brothers Auguste (born in 1812) and Hippolyte (born in 1816) Garnier began working as bookstore clerks in Paris in 1828, and later opened their own business, at the age of 21 and 17 years. The younger brother, Baptiste Louis Garnier (born March 4, 1823), worked for his brother until 1844, and then went to Brazil, arriving in Rio de Janeiro on June 24, 1844. After two years of temporary accommodation, he settled at Rua do Ouvidor, nº 69, and remained there until 1878, moving to No. 71 in front of its main competitor, the "Livraria Universal" E. & H. Laemmert. By 1852, the firm was called the "Garnier Brothers" then "B. L. Garnier "and it is believed that the brothers separated between 1864 and 1865.

In the early 1870s, Garnier had its own printing press, the "Tipografia Franco-americana." Overall, Garnier is credited with 655 works by Brazilian authors published between 1860 and 1890 and several translations, from the French, of the most popular novels. Garnier influenced the French format of books that Brazil adopted: octavo (16.5 x 10.5 cm) and 'in-doze' (17.5 x 11.0 cm, a size close to the A format paperback), an imitation of the Parisian firm Calmann-Levy.

In 1891, in poor health, Baptiste started negotiations for the sale of his company, but dissatisfied with the price, gave up and died three years later, on 1 October 1893; the company passed on to his brother Hippolyte, who resided in Paris, thus returning to being the branch of the "Garnier Frères" in Rio de Janeiro.

Hippolyte Garnier was 77 years old when his brother Baptiste died. The Garnier in France ended up being in the 1890s and 1920s the leading publisher of Spanish-American literature worldwide. The death of Baptiste, as well as of the Laemmert brothers, caused a stagnation in the Brazilian book market, and the fall of the empire completely transformed the social climate. In 1898, Hyppolite sent to Rio de Janeiro a new manager, Julien Lansac, and his Jacinto Silva became his assistant, who had great autonomy, given the difficulties of Julien to speak Portuguese. Hippolyte was sent reform the Garnier facilities, which opened with fanfare. Each guest was presented with an autographed copy of the 2nd edition of Don Casmurro, by Machado de Assis. Around 1904, Jacinto Silva left the firm and was directing the Casa Garraux books department, in São Paulo, and in 1920 launched his own "Casa Editora O Livro", which was the center of the modernist movement.

Garnier Hippolyte died at age 95 in 1911, and Lansac returned to France in 1913; the business passed to a nephew, Auguste P. Garnier, who sent to Rio de Janeiro another French manager, Émile Izard (born in 1874). From then, Garnier went into decline, with few publications, and the end came close to 1934, when the Garnier Bookstore was sold to Ferdinand Briguiet who previously bought the Lachaud bookstore, on Rua Nova do Ouvidor.

- Briguiet-Garnier

When Garnier was sold, it began to use the name Bookstore Briguiet-Garnier, and lasted until 1951, when the "Difusão Européia do Livro" (Difel) took the Brazilian subsidiary of Garnier. The Garnier building was demolished in 1953 to give place to a bank, and Briguiet was restricted to Rua Nova do Ouvidor. Briguiet then had been replaced by his nephew Ferdinand, who died without heirs in the mid 1970. Some of the firm's assets were purchased by "Library Itatiaia" of Belo Horizonte and the Briguiet shop was closed in 1973.

- Lombaerts

Among the foreign bookstores in Rio de Janeiro, one that stood out was the Belgian Jean Baptiste Lombaerts's (1821–1875) that of and his son Henri Gustave Lombaerts (1845–1897), which was the largest of lithographs mounted at the time at Rua do Ourives, No 17. It ran between 1848 and 1904 when the store was demolished to make way for Avenida Central. From 1871 to 1879, the library has produced a supplement in Portuguese to follow one of its main imported periodicals, the French magazine "La Saison". From 1879, it began to publish its own Brazilian edition of the magazine, named "A Estação".

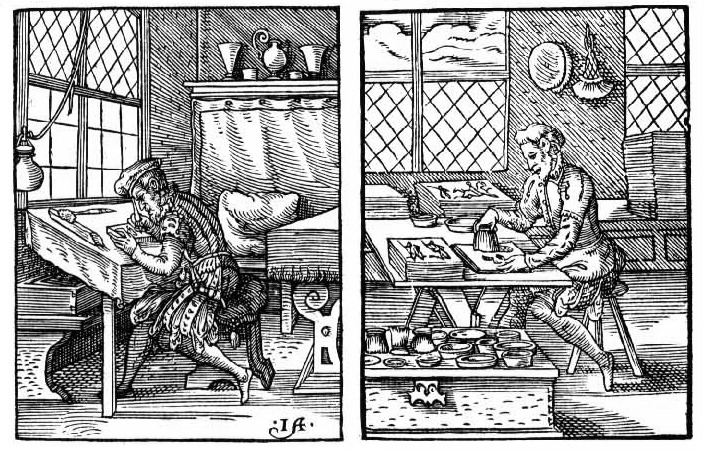
Woodcuts of the sixteenth century illustrating the production of the woodcut. At first, the artist sketches the picture. Second, he uses a chisel to dig the wood block to receive the ink.

- Leuzinger

Another prominent firm was Casa Leuzinger, founded by George Leuzinger (1813–1892), who arrived in Rio de Janeiro in 1832, and until 1840 had saved enough to buy the oldest stationery outlet of the city, "Ao Livro Encadernado" of Jean Charles Bouvier, at Rua do Ouvidor, 31. In 1852, Leuzinger acquired Typographia Franceza, founded by Jean Soleil Saint Amand in 1837, and in 1841 published the first poems of Joaquim Norberto, "Modulações Poéticas", and the first two editions, in 1844 and 1845, of "A Moreninha", by Joaquim Manuel de Macedo. Under the direction of Leuzinger, this became one of the best equipped printing houses in the country. Leuzinger had much involvement in the development of wood engraving (woodcut) in the country, and in 1843, brought from Germany two talented engravers wood, Eduard Hüslemann and R. Rollenberger. In 1850, Rollenberger died of yellow fever and Hüslemann returned to Germany, but left behind many apprentices in Brazil. Leuzinger was responsible, among other things, for the introduction of illustrated postcards in the country, and ventured into photography too. The 54 woodcuts that illustrate the book of Louis and Elizabeth Agassiz, "Journey in Brazil", 1868, are by Leuzinger. As a press, the Leuzinger survived under the name "Gráfica Ouvidor".

- Laemmert

The most important foreign bookshops was, however, Laemmert; between 1893 and the turn of the century, it was the main Brazilian publisher. Eduard Laemmert (born August 10, 1806) and Heinrich (born October 27, 1812) were children of F. W. Laemmert, a Protestant clergyman who educated them at home and at 14 sent them to learn the book trade. Leaving for Paris, Eduard was working in the firm of Bossange Martin and his son Hector. Two years later, Bossange decided to open a branch in Rio de Janeiro, and Eduard, as representative of Bossange, opened a company with a Portuguese called Souza, representative of JP Aillaud. They set up shop at Rua dos Latoeiros (now Gonçalves Dias), No. 88 under the Souza Laemmert name. When the contract expired in 1833, Eduard decided to stay in Brazil, married a Brazilian and started his own business in Quitanda Street # 77, the "Livraria Universal". His brother Heinrich came, at his request, to Brazil, and formed the "E. & H. Laemmert, mercadores de livros e de música (E. & H. Laemmert, dealers of books and music)" in 1838. Soon began to edit and in 1839 created their "Folhinha "annual. In 1844, they began the "Almanack Laemmert" which surpassed all competitors and, in 1875, came to have 1770 pages. They set up in 1868 at Rua do Ouvidor, 68. The printing press Laemmert was inaugurated on January 2, 1838, and named Typographia Universal.

In 1877, Eduard moved away from the firm, going to Karlsruhe, the city where he had learned the craft, and suddenly died there on January 18, 1880. Henry died four years later. All the business went over to a company formed by Gustave Massow, Henry's son-Edgon Widmann Laemmert and Arhur Sauer. In 1891 the firm was reorganized under the name of Laemmert & Companhia, and in 1898, had branches in São Paulo and Recife. In 1903, there was another change of partners, and Edgon was replaced by his son Hugo and Gustave by his brother Hilario. Laemmert had a library with a copy of each edition produced, but this was destroyed by fire in 1909, after which the library was never reopened. The copyright of their property were sold to Francisco Alves, who acquired the most famous of their titles, "Os Sertões", by Euclides da Cunha, whom Laemmert published in 1902 and sold three editions.

Printing continued, and the property, which had been with Arthur Sauer, went to Manuel José da Silva in 1910, who already owned the "Anuário Geral de Portugal (General Yearbook of Portugal)", then the almanac changed the name to "Anuário do Brasil (Brazil Yearbook)". The new organization has undergone several ownership changes, becoming "Sergio & Pinto" in 1919, "Alvaro Pinto & Cia." in 1920, Alexandre Henault & Cia. in 1921, and in 1925 was acquired by the Jockey Club of Rio de Janeiro, where it was called "Almanack Laemmerte Limited". Few books have been produced at that time, especially the "Livro de Ouro do Centenário a Independência do Brasil (Golden Centenary Book of the Independence of Brazil)", on September 7, 1922. In 1942, another fire destroyed the Almanac, and the last number was from 1943. The Gráfica Laemmert returned to publish books by 1970.

- Sellos & Couto

The Sellos & Couto firm was founded in 1815, when José Gonçalves Agra opened a bookstore in Rua do Sabão, No. 22. In the 1820s, the company passed into the hands of Agostinho Gonçalves de Freitas, who was succeeded in 1852 by his nephews Antonio and Agostinho Gonçalves Guimarães, who added to it a printing workshop, "Typographia Episcopal". Antonio began to devote himself to banking and Augustine retired in 1887, selling the firm to his stepson John Antonio Pinto. When he died, bankrupt, the business was purchased by Antonio Joaquim de Sellos and Gaspar Pereira Couto, who began operating first as Sellos, Guimarães & Cia., Then as Sellos & Couto.

- J. Ribeiro dos Santos

J. Ribeiro dos Santos, another major firm, was founded by the Portuguese Serafim José Alves, in 1871, at 11, Praça D. Pedro II, today Praça 15 de Novembro. At the end of the century, it moved to the Rua Sete de setembro, No. 83, and soon afterwards adopted the name of the heir of Alves, Jacintho Ribeiro dos Santos. Jacintho bought the Francisco Rodrigues da Cruz bookstore, successor to the Livraria Cruz Coutinho, the Livraria Popular, which was created by Antonio Augusto da Cruz Coutinho. The Library Jacintho Ribeiro dos Santos stood out for the good workmanship of its textbooks, use of images, and the high number of runs in any of its books, which reached the mark of over 100,000 copies in 1924, in a population of 1,157,141 in the city. As "Livraria Jacintho", it survived until 1945 when it was bought over by "Editora A Noite".

- Livraria Quaresma

The Livraria de Serafim José Alves seems to have had some connection also with the Livraria Quaresma. Pedro da Silva Quaresma was the founder of the "Livraria do Povo" in 1879 inRua São José. The Livraria Quaresma lasted until the 1960s, with cheap books and those of a popular appeal, and was the training grounds for bookseller and used bookstore owner Carlos Ribeiro, who later founded the "Livraria São José", active in the 1950s and 1960s.

- Antônio Joaquim Castilho

The bookseller and printer Castilho is also from this time, but the most important individual from this firm was his son, Antonio Joaquim Castilho. Castilho faced financial difficulties and in 1931, his firm became the "Livraria América", of A, Bedeschi, which lasted until the 1940s, and Castilho was working at Editora Civilização Brasileira.

- Francisco Alves

Born on August 2, 1848, Francisco Alves went to Rio in 1863, and got a job in a store of nautical items, and savings. He opened a used bookstore in Rua São José, then he sold it and went back to Porto. Upon receiving his uncle's invitation to work at his bookstore, he went to Brazil again, and was naturalized on 28 July 1883. The firm Francisco Alves, originally called Livraria Clássica, was founded on August 15, 1854, at Rua of Braziers, No. 54 (later changed to No. 48), by his uncle Nicholas Antonio Alves. Francisco ended up buying the shares of all partners and his uncle by 1897. Initially devoted to textbooks, due to the increasing of the number of schools in the country (in the last years of the Empire, schools increased from 3,561 to 7,500), Francisco Alves came to have a near monopoly of textbooks in Brazil.

Livraria Francisco Alves opened its first branch in São Paulo, on April 23, 1893, where Manuel Pacheco Leão, some of the education secretary and friend of Francis, Teófilo das Neves Leão, was charged with part of the shares of the company. In 1906, he opened a second branch in Belo Horizonte. In São Paulo, acquired the "N. Falconi "and "Livraria Melilo"; in Rio de Janeiro, he acquired "Lombaerts", the "Livraria Católica de Sauvin", the "Livraria Luso-Brasileira" of Lopes da Cunha, the "Empresa Literária Fluminense", of AA da Silva Lobo, the home of "Domingos de Magalhães ". He also bought the Portuguese firm "A Editora", formerly "David Corazzi". In 1909, he acquired the "Laemmert", acquiring the rights to "Os Sertões", by Euclides da Cunha, and Innocence, Taunay. He also bought a small bookstore "Viúva Azevedo" in Rio de Janeiro.

In the literary line, Francisco Alves published Afrânio Peixoto, Emílio de Menezes, Raul Pompeii, among others, but most of his books were printed abroad, for economic and technical reasons which prevented the internal printing, which was the cause of criticism from many nationalists. In his spare time, Francisco Alves wrote his own books under the pseudonym William Prado or F. d'Oliveira. They were cataloged after his death, totalling some 39 books of his own.

Alves was diabetic and acquired pneumonia that led to tuberculosis. When the member Leo Pacheco died on December 23, 1913, Alves acquired the share of the widow, but himself died on June 29, 1917, after complications from a broken leg in a railway accident. In his will, he left a great legacy and a lifetime pension to a lady who had been his mistress since 1891, Maria Dolores Braun. All the rest of his property would be left for the Brazilian Academy of Letters, but with the condition that the academy should hold every five years, two competitions in his honor, each with a first prize of 10 short stories, a second five stories and a third of three stories. One of the contests should be for monographs on "the best way to expand primary education in Brazil", and the other for monographs on the Portuguese language. Through the academy is statutorily prevented from managing any type of business, it sold the bookshop to a group of former employees, led by Paulo Ernesto Azevedo Pacheco, Leão's successor in managing the affiliate of São Paulo, and Antonio de Oliveira Martins. The new company adopted the name "Paulo de Azevedo & Companhia", but continued to use the mark F. Alves, and to dominate the market of textbooks until the appearance of Companhia Editora Nacional, of Octalles Marcondes Ferreira, in the decade of the 1920s.

Paulo Azevedo died in 1946 and was succeeded by his children Ivo and Ademar. The latter admitted as members Alvaro Ferreira de Almeida, Raul da Silva Passos and Lelio de Castro Andrade, to work towards the revitalization of the bookshop. In 1972, the company was sold to Admiral José Celso de la Rocque Maciel Soares Guimarães, who changed its name to "Livraria Francisco Alves Editora"; in 1974, Netumar shipping company, owned by Ariosto Amado, acquired 80% of its capital and Carlos Leal took over its management.

- Other publishers

Other major publishers and bookstores at the end of the nineteenth century were the publishing firm Editora Pimenta de Mello, founded in 1845 and which survived until 1937, and the Livraria Moderna, Domingos de Magalhaes e Companhia, a leading publisher in the field of literature in the 1890s.

== Publishing in São Paulo ==
- Século XIX

São Paulo, in the early nineteenth century, formed a single province together with Paraná, had a small capital with less than 10,000 inhabitants, and then enjoyed little importance. In 1827, José da Costa Carvalho, the future Marquis of Monte Alegre, imported a press and a printer, and produced the first newspaper of the province, "O Farol Paulistano".

In 1827, the city of São Paulo was chosen to host one of the two country's law schools, and student life there transformed the city. In 1836, a São Paulo press printed the book, "Questões sobre presas marítimas", by Jose Maria Avelar Brotero. This was followed by other works, and the first of the locally produced literature emerged: in 1849, Rosas e Goivos, by the then student José Bonifácio, o Moço and, in 1852, Cantos da Solidão, by Bernardo Guimarães, printed in "Typographia Liberal" which was owned by Joaquim Roberto de Azevedo Marques.

In 1855, São Paulo had a population of only 25,000 inhabitants, while Rio de Janeiro had crossed a quarter million and Salvador and Recife were over 80,000. There were three bookstores, "Fernandes de Souza", "Gravesnes" and "Torres de Oliveira", and three presses, the "Typographia Liberal" of Azevedo Marques, the "Typographia Dous de Dezembro" (no connection with the Paula Brito) of Antonio Antunes Lousada, and "Typographia Litteraria". There also was a bookbinder, the German U. Knossel, whose business was acquired in 1880 by the German Jorge Seckler, and became important graphic with steam-powered printers. In the late 1860, also in operation were the "Typographia Litteraria", the "Typographia Americana" and "Typographia Americana" typography.

- Casa Garraux

In 1860, the French publisher Baptiste Louis Garnier opened a branch in São Paulo and entrusted it to Anatole Louis Garraux (1833–1904). Three years later, Garraux became independent and opened the Livraria Acadêmica, in partnership with Guelfe de Lailhac and Raphael Suares. This publishing house was known as "Casa Garraux". It was in the Casa Garraux that José Olympio began to build an interest in the book market, getting a job tidying and cleaning books there.

Before 1920, Garraux did not publish, but became a prominent bookseller, becoming the bookstore with the most updated stock of the country. From 1872, coffee was modifying the provincial scene, and in this year the Garraux moved from Largo da Sé to the Rua da Imperatriz (the future XV de Novembro), going on to play role important in the intellectual and cultural development of the region. Garraux passed on the direction of the store at that time to his son in law Willy Fischer, who retired in 1888, and his successor, Alexander Thiollier, ran the business until 1893, then moving the direction of the hands of the partner Charles Hildebrand, of Strasbourg.

- Other São Paulo bookstores

From three bookstores in 1850, São Paulo grew to five in 1870, one of these being the "Great Library Paulista", which the brothers Antonio and Maria José Joaquim Teixeira opened in 1876.

In 1893, due to Italian immigration and also the trail of drought in the North East, São Paulo grew in size to have 192,409 inhabitants and at the turn of the century, it equaled Rio de Janeiro, with 239,820 inhabitants. The paper industry installed in the state began to grow; one of the factories was the "Cia. Melhoramentos de São Paulo", formed in 1890 by Colonel Anthony Proost Brill, and in 1920 joined the paper industry for books, associating with the label of "Weiszflog Brothers". At the end of the century, however, São Paulo still had only eight bookstores. Among others, the prominent ones included "Casa Eclectica".

== 20th century ==
- Monteiro Lobato

Till the First World War, Brazilian books were printed mostly in Europe. The Garnier Publisher, used by Machado and almost all Academic, was French and had their workshops in France. Coelho Neto was printed on Porto in Portugal, and edited by Lelo & Brother. Brazilian publishers and bookstores devoted themselves more to textbooks, and little was printed in Brazil.

Lobato took the initiative that changed the Brazilian publishing market. Printed on their own, in the newspaper presses of "O Estado de S. Paulo", his book Urupês, found that at the time, Brazil had only 30 bookstores that were able to receive and sell books. He then wrote to all postmasters of Brazil (1300 in all), requesting the names and addresses of newsagents, stationers, warehouses and pharmacies interested in selling books. Almost 100% of postal agents responded, providing a network of nearly two thousand distributors across the country. Lobato began publishing works of his friends and novice writers.

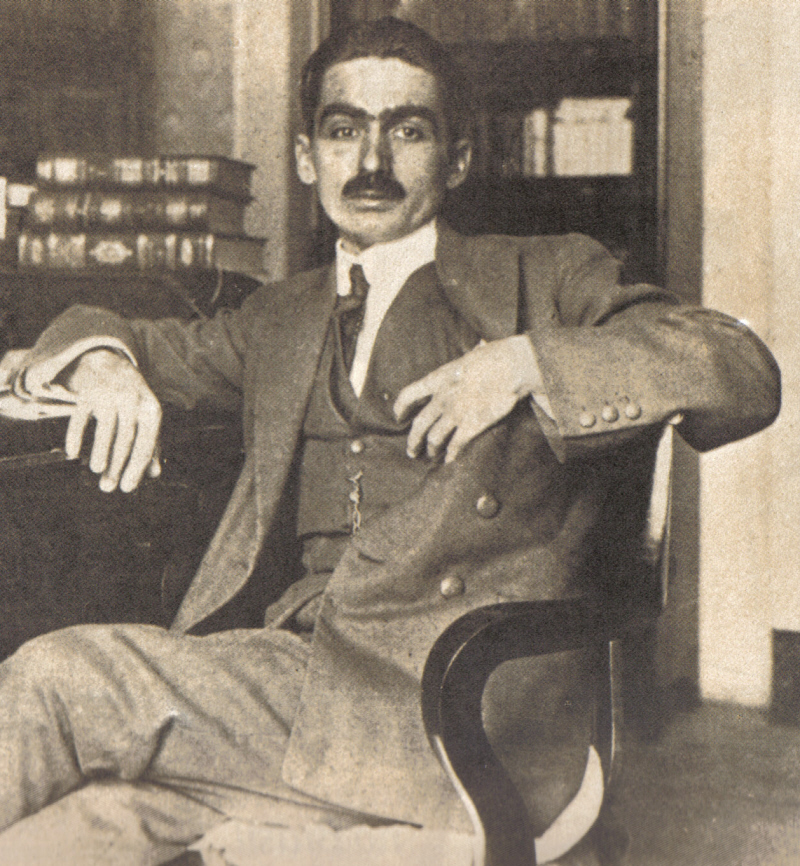
Lobato, one of the great supporters of the book in Brazil, Companhia Editora Nacional: "A country is made with men and books."

When the original firm of Cia. Gráfio-Editora Monteiro Lobato collapsed, Octalles Marcondes Ferreira (1899–1972), who was his assistant and became his partner, encouraged him to open another publishing venture, and in November 1925, the Companhia Editora Nacional was already established and was preparing to publish a version, supervised by Lobato, of the 1st book written in Brazil in the sixteenth century, the story of Hans Staden, "My Captivity Among the Brazilian Wild", with a print run of 5000 copies.

While Octalles remained in São Paulo, Lobato ran the branch of Rio de Janeiro; traveling to the United States, due to speculation in the stock market and the crash of October 1929, Lobato had to sell to Octalles his publisher's shares, and went on to contribute just as an author and translator.

The publisher began investing gradually in educational titles. In 1932, Octalles acquired Editora Civilização Brasileira, founded in 1929 by Getúlio M. Costa, Ribeiro Couto e Gustavo Barroso, and now, slowly, passed on to the son Enio Silveira. In 1934, the brand "Nacional" was almost entirely reserved for teaching and children's books. In 1943, there six teachers responsible for implementing the textbooks abandoning the company, they went on to found their own publishing house, the "Editora do Brasil", specializing in books relating to teaching. The assistant of Octalles, Arthur Neves (1916–1971), left and formed Editora Brasiliense, which launched its own bookstore, the "Livraria Brasiliense."

Octalles died in 1973, and presidency of the company passed on to his brother Lindolfo. In 1974 Livraria José Olympio Editora requested financial aid to buy the publisher, However, this operation was never undertaken. "The company Jose Olimpio requested government aid: in this case, the total financing of the operation, so the National Bank for Economic Development (BNDES) acquired all the shares of the company [...] however, the economic situation of José Olympio made the desired transfer impossible and the Nacional eventually became property of the BNDE."

In 1980, the Brazilian Institute of Pedagogical Issues (IBEP) acquired Companhia Editora Nacional, forming one of the largest publishing groups in the country. In 2009, Conrad Editora, specializing in Comic, was bought by IBEP-Group Company Editora Nacional

- Jose Olympio

The publisher started in 1931, also in São Paulo, with a successful book, "Know thyself by psychoanalysis", by the American J. Ralph, a work that today is known as a self-help title. In the 1940s and 1950s, Olympio became the country's largest publisher, publishing 2 000 titles, with 5000 issues, which in the 1980s comprised 30 million books 900 national authors and 500 foreign authors books.

The Livraria José Olympio bookstore got into a crisis that began with the collapse in the stock market. In the 1970s, he tried to buy Companhia Editora Nacional. On May 3, 1990, when he died, José Olympio was no longer owner of the publishing house that bore his name, because after being taken over by the BNDES in the 70s, it was bought by Record in 2001; today it belongs to Grupo Editorial Record.

- Publisher Martins

José de Barros Martins decided to leave the job to open a bookstore in a small room on the first floor of a building in the Rua da Quitanda in São Paulo, in 1937. He organized his own editorial department, under the direction of Edgard Cavalheiro and his first title in early 1940 was "Direito Social Brasileiro", dealing with the Brazilian social law, and authored by Antonio Ferreira Cesarino Junior.

Martins promoted the liquidation of his company in 1974, but tried to remain in the business, the most valuable negotiating publishing contracts with Editora Record. Currently, Martins Editora is an imprint of Livraria Martins Fontes.

- Civilização Brasileira

Founded by Getúlio M. Costa, Ribeiro Couto and Gustavo Barroso in 1929, the company Civilização Brasileira had at the time few titles, and in 1932 was acquired by Octalles Marcondes Ferreira, becoming part of the Companhia Editora Nacional. Enio Silveira took part in the Civilização Brasileira, and increased its impact, and at the end of the 1950s, it had become already one of the leading publishers in the country. In 1963, Enio Silveira took full control of Civilização Brasileira and the following year his book output was the same as that of the Companhia Editora Nacional, added 46 new titles. Civilização Brasileira eventually becoming the most important channel for modern Brazilian literature in the 1960s, in addition to devote to translations of both the European countries as the US, Japanese and Latin American.

In 1982, Enio accepted an operational supply from DIFEL, a foreign company, to cooperate with his firm. At the same time, Banco Pinto de Magalhães, the Portuguese bank, and a Portuguese entity, Batista da Silva, acquired 90% stake in Civilização Brasileira, and Enio's share was 10%. In March 1984, it formalized the transfer of the Civilização Brasileira operations to São Paulo, maintaining a branch in Rio de Janeiro. Silveira of Enio died in 1996. Currently, the Civilização Brasileira is part of Grupo Editorial Record.

- Publisher Attica

Between 1964 and 1965, Editora Attica made an impact. On 15 October 1956, the Curso de Madureza Santa Inês was founded, for the education of youth and adults, by the brothers Anderson Fernandes Dias and Vasco Fernandes Dias Filho and his friend Antonio Narvaes Filho. Over time, through the increasing number of students, the mimeograph became insufficient to print handouts, and 1962 saw the creation of Sesil (Sociedade Editora do Santa Inês Ltda. or the Santa Inês Publishing Society Ltd.). Anderson Fernandes Dias, however, backed the creation of a publishing house. Thus, Editora Attica emerged in August 1965, and the following year, it already had 20 titles in its catalog.

In 1999, Attica was bought by Editora Abril, in partnership with the French group Vivendi. In 2002, Vivendi sold its publications branch companies to the French group Lagardère, but Editora Attica got out of that commercial transaction. In 2003, the two controlling shareholders of Attica – April and Vivendi – again put the publisher up for sale. After a year of negotiations, the financial assets of Vivendi were acquired by Editora Abril, in February 2004, becoming the majority owner of Editora Attica, ushering in a new phase in the company's history, which became part of Abril Education. In early 2005, the publisher began to work on building the Edifício Abril on Marginal Tiete.

- Bookstore Globe

In the 1880s, the "Livraria Americana", originally set up in Pelotas, by Carlos Pinto, had several translations of foreign authors, not always with permission of the authors. Such cases, and many others, led to a reaction by the authors and the government, and began to establish laws in order to preserve those rights. The origins of Editora Globo belong to this time, but the publisher did not start a regular program of editions in 1928. Thus, in the early 1930s, the Livraria do Globo emerged in Porto Alegre, and the beginning of the publishing industry seems to have given especially the disadvantageous position of the new government with respect to the copyright rights of others States. The magazine Globo, having no money to republished materials, also resorted to piracy

The flourishing of publishing activity was also due to the development and growth of the Rio Grande do Sul, at the time of the Old Republic, 1889–1930. The Editora Globo started with a small stationery and bookstore, founded in 1883 by Portuguese immigrant Laudelino Pinheiro Barcellos, next to which was built a graphic workshop for custom work. José Bertaso, a boy admitted for minor services in 1890, became a partner and in 1919, the owner. Bertaso predicted shortages of paper with the First World War and cared enough to profit later from the sales. The "Barcellos, Bertaso and Co." acquired a linotype machine, the first in the state, and in 1922 began to publish books leading to a local literary revival, the counterpart of the modernist movement. Mansueto Bernardi, an Italian and director of the publicity department, was even more ambitious, and encouraged the publication of translated titles. He has assembled a team of reviewers, translators and graphic artists, and created the magazine Revista do Globo.

Bernardi in 1931 with the creation of the Estado Novo, exited the field of editorial activity and began to drive the Mint. The eldest of his three sons, Henry d'Avila Bertaso, who began in Livraria Globo bookstore in 1922, at age 15, took over the publishing industry, while the direction of the Globe Magazine was given to a young writer, Erico Verissimo, who became one of the main translators of the publisher. Verissimo's career as an author had begun in 1928 when Bernardi accepted his story "Ladrão de Gado" ("Cattle Thief") for theRevista do Globo magazine. His first book, "Fantoches" ("Puppets") was a collection of short stories that H. Bertaso accepted for publication in 1932. After a few books, the only commercial success came in 1935 with "Caminhos Cruzados", which received several awards.

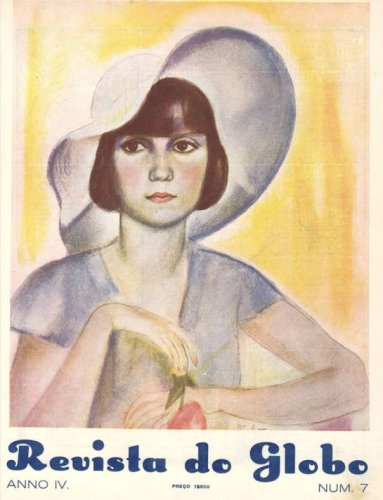
Cover 'magazine Globe' 'Year IV No. 7, 1932, with illustration of Francis Pelichek

Due to the economic situation, the Brazilian book became competitive, a fact that was capitalised on by the Livraria Globo bookstore. In 1936, the company already had three floors, 500 employees, 20 Linotype machines, and the publishing industry had about 500 titles. Verissimo passed on the control of the magazine to De Souza Júnior, and b H. Bertaso became editorial consultant, allowing for the gain of the literary publisher's quality. The policy emphasized the Anglo-American authors, due to the preponderance of translations from English. With the World War II, there was a sudden prosperity in the book business, and several translators were employed, such as Leonel Vallandro, Juvenal Jacinto, Herbert Caro, and Homero de Castro as permanent employees. In the early 1950s, with the rigor in Brazil over the control of remittance of foreign currency abroad, there was a decline in the production of translations of the globe. There then was a slight recovery in the 1960s, but without recovery of the old interest especially in other areas.

Verissimo began to devote more to his own literary production; José Bertaso died in 1948 and in 1956, when the Globo reached its 2,000th title since 1930, it was decided to transform the publishing part of the business into a legally separate development, creating Editora Globo. Verissimo was gradually disengaging the Globo, and died in 1975. Henry Bertaso died in 1977, having passed on his business to his sons Jose Otavio, Fernando and Claudio. In 1986 the company was sold to Rio Gráfica Editora (GER) of Roberto Marinho. Rio Graphic started using only the Editora Globo name since.

- National Institute of Books

With the revolution of 1930, the Rio Grande do Sul gained importance on the national scene. With the implementation of the Estado Novo, one of the consequences was the creation of the National Book Institute, the initiative of Minister Capanema in September / December 1937 (Decree-Law No. 93 of September 21 of 1937). The poet Augusto Meyer was the director until 1954 and again from 1961 to 1967. It was created and encouraged by Getúlio Vargas with the objective of developing an encyclopedia and dictionary of the Brazilian language and to build the identity and national memory and support the implementation of public libraries throughout Brazil. Until 1945, however, they had not yet completed the encyclopedia and dictionary, but the number of public libraries has grown, especially in the states of cultural scarcity, thanks to the help provided by INL in the collection of the composition and technical training.

- Other prominent publishers

Besides those already mentioned, in the early twentieth century among the other important ones were, in Rio de Janeiro Livraria H. Antunes founded by Hector Antunes in 1909, and Arthur Vecchi in 1913, which began with publication of books and later dedicated itself to comic books. Besides these, the Livraria Editora Leite Ribeiro e Maurillo, founded in Rio de Janeiro in 1917, and in the mid-1920s was renamed as Freitas Bastos; Livraria Católica, founded by the poet Augusto Frederico Schmidt, in 1930, which soon became a meeting point for intellectuals of the time. Those who attended became known as the "Catholic Circle". Schmidt took later removed the 'Catholic' word from its name and it became and was just Livraria Schmidt Editora, which remained so until 1939, when the business was absorbed and the facilities acquired by Zélio Valverde, in whose firm Schmidt became a partner. Others are the Gianlorenzo Schettino Livraria Editora, which existed from 1922 to 1931;Editora A. Coelho Branco, and Editora Ariel, of the writers Gastao Cruls and Agrippino Grieco, which was exclusively a publisher.

- Publishing in other states

In Rio Grande do Sul, apart from Editora Globo, the oldest publisher was the "Livraria e Editora Selbach", founded in 1931, having started its activity with "Farrapos!", by Walter Spalding. It ended around 1960, Other major publishers were "Livraria Sulina" founded in 1946 by the brothers Leopold and Nelson Boeck, which specialized in law, business administration and history. The "Tabajara" with textbooks, and L&PM Editores, created by Ivan Pinheiro Machado and Paulo de Lima, in 1974, at the time to publish a single book, "Rango, história em quadrinhos de um marginal" by Edgar Vasques, which had appeared before in the Porto Alegre newspaper "Folha da Manhã". Encouraged by the success, the two young editors began to publish a small number, but select titles, questioning the government of the time, during the military dictatorship. In the 1970s, other major publishers were Editora Movimento and Editora-Mercado-Aberto.

In Paraná, at Curitiba, in the 1930s Editora Guaira gained national reputation with titles like "Esperança" by André Malraux, "Doña Barbara" by Rómulo Gallegos, among others. In the early 1940s, production was 40 titles per year. It declined after World War II. Also in Curitiba, Editora dos Professores, created by Ocyron Cunha in 1962, was intended to produce works of regional teachers, and is currently inactive.

Santa Catarina, despite having only a little publishing activity, has plenty of outlets, and most of its municipalities have bookstores, which got it the fifth national place in book sales in the 1980.

In the other cities of Rio de Janeiro, Petropolis was noteworthy, with Editora Vozes created on March 5, 1901, by the local Franciscan convent. It is the oldest publisher in Brazil still active.

In Minas Gerais, at Belo Horizonte one initiative that stands out is the Livraria Itatiaia Editora, as well as Editora Comunicação, Editora Vega, Interlivros and LEMI (Livraria Editora Miguilim), publisher of children's books.

In Bahia, between the 1940s and 1960s, the most important editorial brand was the "Livraria Progresso", by Aguiar and Souza Ltda. (not to be confused with the Progresso do Grupo Delta). Another was the Edições Macunaíma, founded in 1957 by Calasans Neto, Fernando da Rocha Peres, Glauber Rocha and Paulo Soares Gili as Macunaíma Editorials Empreendimentos Ltda. In 1974, the highlight was the Editora Itapuã of Dmeval Keys and Editora Janaína, or Jorge Amado.

In Recife, the highlights were the "Livraria Sete", and "Gráfica Amador", which changed its name to Editora Igarassu, and in 1980, Editora Guararapes.

== Pocket books ==
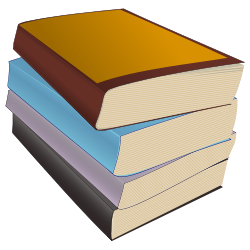
thumbs

There have been several attempts in Brazil to produce a lower-priced book. In the "Coleção Globo" of Livraria do Globo, in the early 1930s, 24 titles were released, including classics, adventures and police fiction, in the format 11x16 cm, cartoned. In 1942, Bertaso started the "Coleção Tucano" with fiction of good quality, such as works by André Gide, Thomas Mann, and others. In the 1960s, Globo launched the "Coleção Catavento" successfully. In 1944, there was the "Coleção Saraiva" of Brazilian classics.

There were distribution attempts through newsagents and kiosks at airports. In 1956, Editora Monterrey was constituted to produce popular light fiction (pulp) in paperback format, founded by the Spanish published O Coyote (The Coyote) series and Brigitte Montfort. An example of better quality was the Tecnoprint Gráfica, which later adopted the editorial brand of Edições de Ouro, its most famous title in the format being the series of German science fiction Perry Rhodan.

In the 1960, Dominus Editora S/A (DESA) came out with pocket editions and Livraria José Olympio Editora launched the "Sagarana" with reprints in small format. In 1970, the Editora Bruguera, the Brazilian subsidiary of Francisco Bruguera, Argentina, published a foreign and domestic fiction pocketbook collection, mostly in the public domain. Editora Artenova also worked with pocketbook. In the end of 1971, the Editora Edibolso started with just 14 titles and in late 1977 already launched nearly a hundred paperbacks. Some of the best known pocket collections today are of L&PM (Pocket Guide or Coleção Pocket) and Martin Claret.

In the 1990s the editor Vicente Fittipaldi (Editora Fittipaldi and Editora Contato) stood out in the segment, editing over 6 million copies annually with distribution in newsstands by Abril group.

== Current editorial overview ==
From the 1980s there was an upward growth trend in the Brazilian publishing market, with an increase in the publishing sector. New publishers emerged, but many of the old have been replaced or incorporated into others. The Companhia Editora Nacional, for example, currently belongs to Grupo-IBEP, and Civilização Brasileira, the Grupo Editorial Record, which appeared in 1942 and marked its entry into publishing in 1957. The Editora Pensamento-Cultrix merged into Editora Pensamento-Cultrix while Editora Cortez & Moraes separated, forming the Editora Cortez and Editora Moraes, which in turn became the Centauro Editora label. Old publishers survived as Editora Brasiliense and Editora Vozes, the oldest still active in Brazil, and new publishers have grown and diversified the national publishing scene as Editora Perspectiva (1965), Editora Nórdica (1970), Editora Cátedra (1970), Martin Clare (1970), Alfa-Ômega (1973), Editora Rocco (1975), Companhia das Letras (1986), among others.

- Editora Nova Fronteira

The Editora Nova Fronteira was founded in Rio de Janeiro em1965, the political journalist Carlos Lacerda. Before he died in 1977, he built a formal link with the Editora Nova Aguilar, founded in 1958 by a nephew of the owner of his namesake in Madrid. With the death of Lacerda, his sons Sergio and Sebastian took over.

- Editora Abril

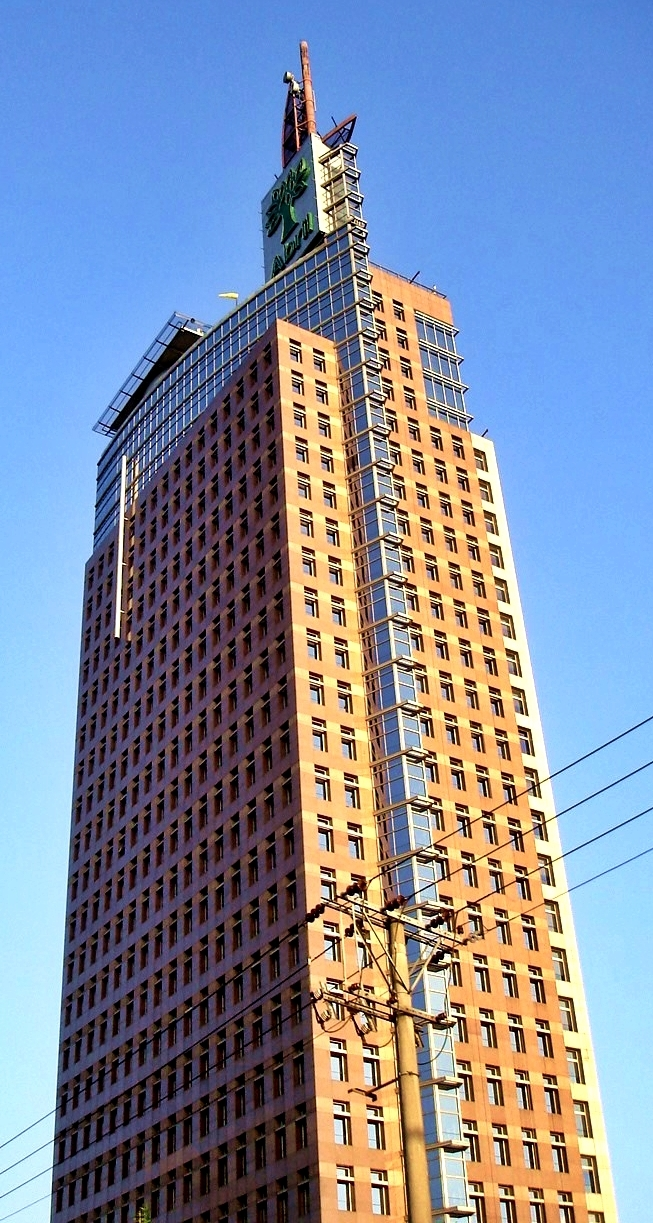
Birmann 21 Editora Abril's headquarters in São Paulo, is one of the tallest skyscrapers in Brazil.

Editora Abril was responsible for the success of a kind of book sold on newsstands: the edition in fascicles (a section of a book or set of books being published in installments as separate pamphlets or volumes). Editora Abril was founded by Victor Civita and his friend Giordano Rossi in 1950, initially as a magazine publisher. It started with Donald Duck, working with the Walt Disney organization, and their first venture in the book market was in 1965, with an illustrated edition of the Holy Bible, in fortnightly installments, followed by others of general interest. The growth and acceptance it received were outstanding, and in 1974, its fascicles on philosophy, Os Pensadores (The Thinkers) of which it sold 100,000 copies a week. In 1982, they launched Os Economistas, including 20 titles that had never been published before in Portuguese.

- The current situation of reading in Brazil

The National Union of Book Publishers (Sindicato Nacional dos Editores de Livros, SNEL), the Brazilian Book Chamber (Câmara Brasileira do Livro, CBL), the Brazilian Association of Book Publishers (Associação Brasileira de Editores de Livros, ABRELIVROS) and the Brazilian Association of Pulp and Paper (Associação Brasileira de Celulose e Papel, BRACELPA) research the reading habits of Brazilians and provide information for planning the market and public policies, and currently has about 659 publishers registered.

A survey by the Associação Nacional de Livrarias (ANL), available on July 27, 2010, shows that in the country there are currently 2980 stores – 11% more than there were in 2006. The ANL points out, however, that the Brazilians read only 1.9 books per year, which falls short of the average in other Latin American countries. Vitor Tavares, president of the ANL, gives examples: "In Argentina, we read about five. In Chile, three. In Colombia, reads 2.5 books a year. " Also according to Tavares, "More and more libraries are opened in big cities but in towns of up to 80,000 inhabitants, often there is no selling point." Also according to the ANL, the southeastern region has the largest number of shops; São Paulo, with 864 retailers specializing in books, has more than twice the second place, followed by Rio de Janeiro, Minas Gerais and Rio Grande do Sul. The Paraná is in fifth place in number of bookstores. Bahia has the largest number of bookstores in the Northeast, and the sixth in the country, tied with Santa Catarina; Roraima, despite having only 25 bookstores has, proportionally, in the North, the best national average.

== Survey ==
On 23 July 2010, the Valor Econômico newspaper held a poll with a group of critics and teachers to identify what is the best publisher in Brazil, which resulted in the Companhia das Letras showing up in the first place (81%), and the Cosac Naify at second (76%). In the third spot were Editora 34, Martins Fontes and Record; in fourth was Editora UFMG; in fifth Ateliê Editorial, Editora Hedra, Editora Iluminuras, Editora da Unicamp; and in the sixth spot Contraponto Editora, Difel, Edusp, Editora Escrituras, Editora Perspectiva, UnB, Editora Vozes, WMF Martins Fontes, Zahar Editores.

The survey conducted by the newspaper did not aim to measure business efficiency, but to focus on publishers who stand out culturally. Voting started with an emphasis on artistic and literary areas and the humanities, and the ability to intervene in the cultural life and to form readers with the criteria if measuring the quality of a publisher. The 21 experts surveyed were asked to name the best three publishing houses. The more specialized areas were excluded, such as technical books, self-help, textbooks and supplementary teaching material.

== See also ==
- Collection (publishing)
- List of libraries in Brazil

== Biographical references ==
- ALVES FILHO, Manuel. Editora da Unicamp é relacionada entre as melhores do país. Jornal da Unicamp, 2 a 8 de agosto de 2010, p. 10
- CARVALHO, Alfredo Ferreira de (1908). Annaes da imprensa periodica pernambucana de 1821-1908. Recife: Jornal do Recife.
- COSTA, Francisco Agusto Pereira da (1951). Anais Pernambucanos, 1493-1850. Vol. 1. Recife: Arquivo Público Estadual.A referência emprega parâmetros obsoletos (Ajuda)
- ERICKSEN, Nestor (1941). A origem da Imprensa no Rio Grande do Sul. Rio Grande do Sul: Revista do instituto Histórico e Geográfico do Rio Grande do Sul.
- FERRARI, Márcio. Valor Econômico. São Paulo, 23 July 2010. In: Clipping
- FERREIRA, Orlando da Costa (1976). Imagem e letra: Introdução à bibliografia brasileira. São Paulo: Melhoramentos. p. 234.A referência emprega parâmetros obsoletos (Ajuda)
- GONDIN, Eunice Ribeiro (1965). Vida e Obra de Paula Brito. Rio de Janeiro: Brasíliana.A referência emprega parâmetros obsoletos (Ajuda)
- HALLEWELL, Laurence (1985). O livro no Brasil: sua história. São Paulo: Coleção Coroa Vermelha, Estudos Brasileiros, v. 6. ISBN 85-85008-24-5.A referência emprega parâmetros obsoletos (Ajuda)
- HALLEWELL, Laurence (2005). O livro no Brasil: sua história. São Paulo. São Paulo: EdUSP. ISBN 9788531408779.
- LOBATO, Monteiro (1947). "Urupês". Obras Completas de Monteiro Lobato, volume 1. Notas Biográficas e Críticas de Artur Neves. São Paulo: Brasiliense. pp. 3–37.
- MACARTNEY, George (1793). Journal of a voyage from London to Cochin China, 11th July 1792-15th July 1793. Londres, Wellcome Historical Medical Library. MS 3352.
- MACEDO, Joaquim Manuel de (1878). Memórias da Rua do Ouvidor (reimpresso nas Edições de Ouro, 1966:252 ed.). Rio de Janeiro: Perseverança.
- MACHADO, Ubiratan (2003). A Etiqueta de Livros no Brasil. São Paulo: EdUSP, Oficina do Livro Rubens B. de Moraes, Imprensa Oficial do Estado de São Paulo. ISBN 85-314-0768-0.
- MATTOS, José Veríssimo (1969). História da Literatura Brasileira (5th ed.). Rio de Janeiro: José Olympio. pp. 170–171.
- RIZZINI, Carlos (1946). O Livro, o Jornal e a Tipografia no Brasil, 1500-1822. Rio de Janeiro: Kosmos.
- RIZZINI, Carlos (1977). O Jornalismo antes da Tipografia. São Paulo: Nacional.
- SODRÉ, Nelson Werneck (1970). Memórias de um escritor. Rio de Janeiro: Civilização Brasileira. pp. 291–293.
- TAUNAY, Afonso d'Escragnolle (1936). De Brasíliae rebus pluribus: o primeiro livro impresso no Brasil. São Paulo: Anais do Museu Paulista.
- VERÍSSIMO, Érico (1967). Ficção Completa. Vol. 3, 49. Rio: Aguilar.
