= Colégio Culto à Ciência =

School in Campinas, Brazil

Coordinates: 22°54′02.36″S 47°04′07.35″W

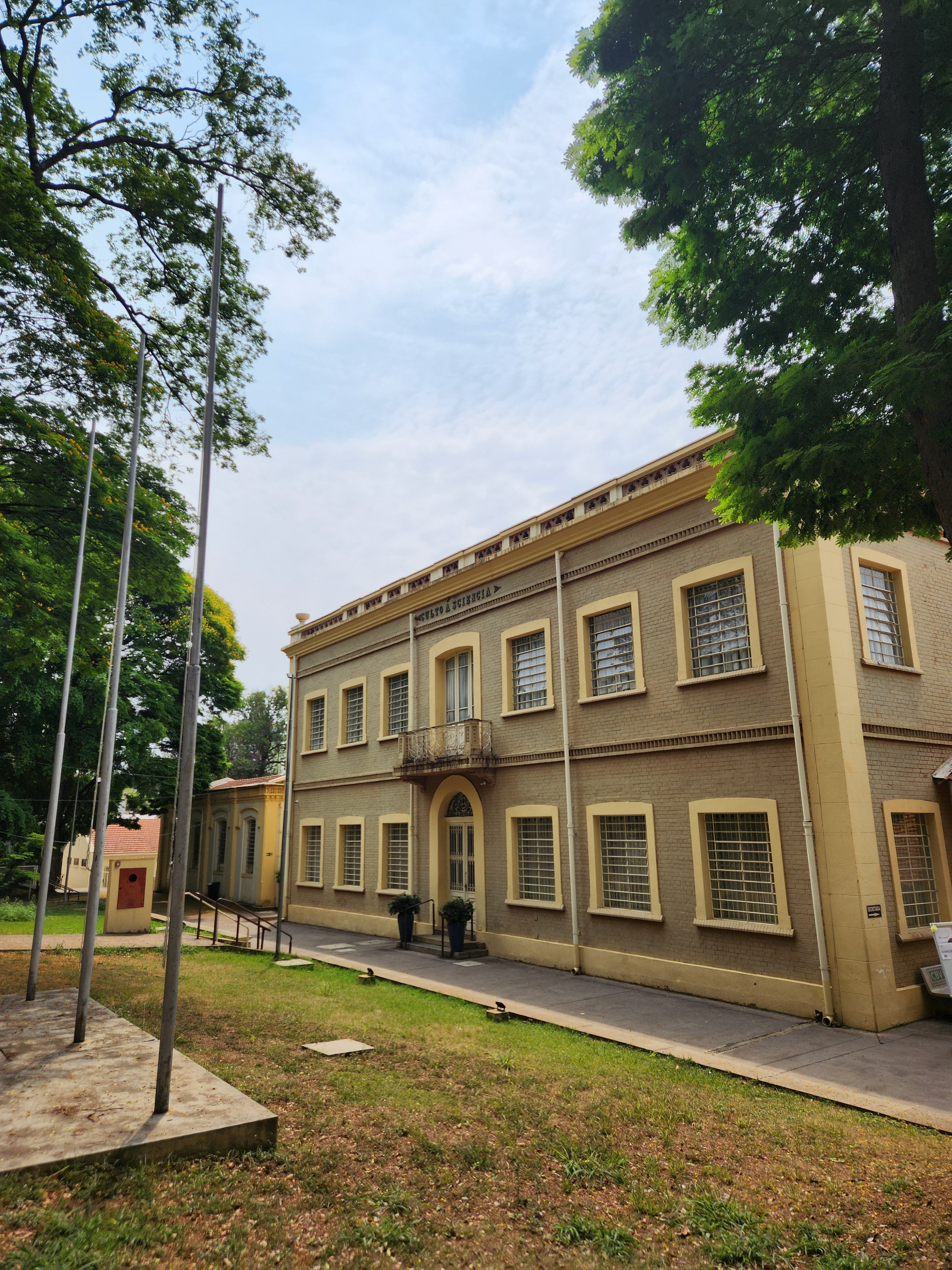
Colégio Culto à Ciência

The Colégio Culto à Ciência (Portuguese for "Cult to Science" High School), denominated E.E. Culto à Ciência), is a public secondary school located in the city of Campinas, state of São Paulo, Brazil. It was founded in 1874, as a boy's private school by Sociedade Culto à Ciência, which members were partly of the Mason's Commission of the Campinas' Justice Lodge "Independence". Composed by the city's farmers, merchants and intellectuals, among such were: Antônio Pompeu de Camargo; Francisco Glicério; Manoel Ferraz de Campos Salles, then the Secretary of the Campinas' Lodge (later, President of Brazil during 1898-1902); Jorge Krug; Joaquim Bonifácio do Amaral, Viscount of Indaiatuba; Joaquim Egídio de Souza Aranha, Marquis of Três Rios; Cândido Ferreira; and, the Baron of Atibaia.

The school's name reflects the influence of positivism on its founders. In 1890 the school went through a financial crisis and had to close its doors until 1896, when it was reopened under the aegis of the state (then province of São Paulo), as the Ginásio Estadual (State Gymnasium).

Until 1964, when a controversial educational reform was promoted by the military régime, it was an equalitarian, high quality school, used both by the economical élite and the ascending middle class. Presently, they are part of the state educational system, Secretaria do Estado de São Paulo.

== Notable alumni ==
- Alberto Santos-Dumont - pioneer aviator,
- Antonio Ferreira Cesarino Junior - jurist, physician, economist and university professor at the (University of São Paulo and at the Pontifícia Universidade Católica de São Paulo,
- Regina Duarte - TV actress,
- Fausto Silva - TV showman,
- Renato M.E. Sabbatini - scientist and professor,
- Marcelo Damy - physicist and university professor (USP and UNICAMP).
