= The Devil to Pay in the Backlands =

1956 novel by João Guimarães Rosa

- Cover for the Italian edition
- Author: João Guimarães Rosa
- Original title: Grande Sertão: Veredas
- Translator: James L. Taylor; Harrient de Onis
- Language: Portuguese
- Genre: novel
- Set in: Sertão, early 20th century
- Publisher: José Olympio
- Publication date: 1956
- Publication place: Brazil
- English publication date: 1963
- Pages: 450
- Dewey Decimal: 869.342
- LC Class: PQ9697.R76

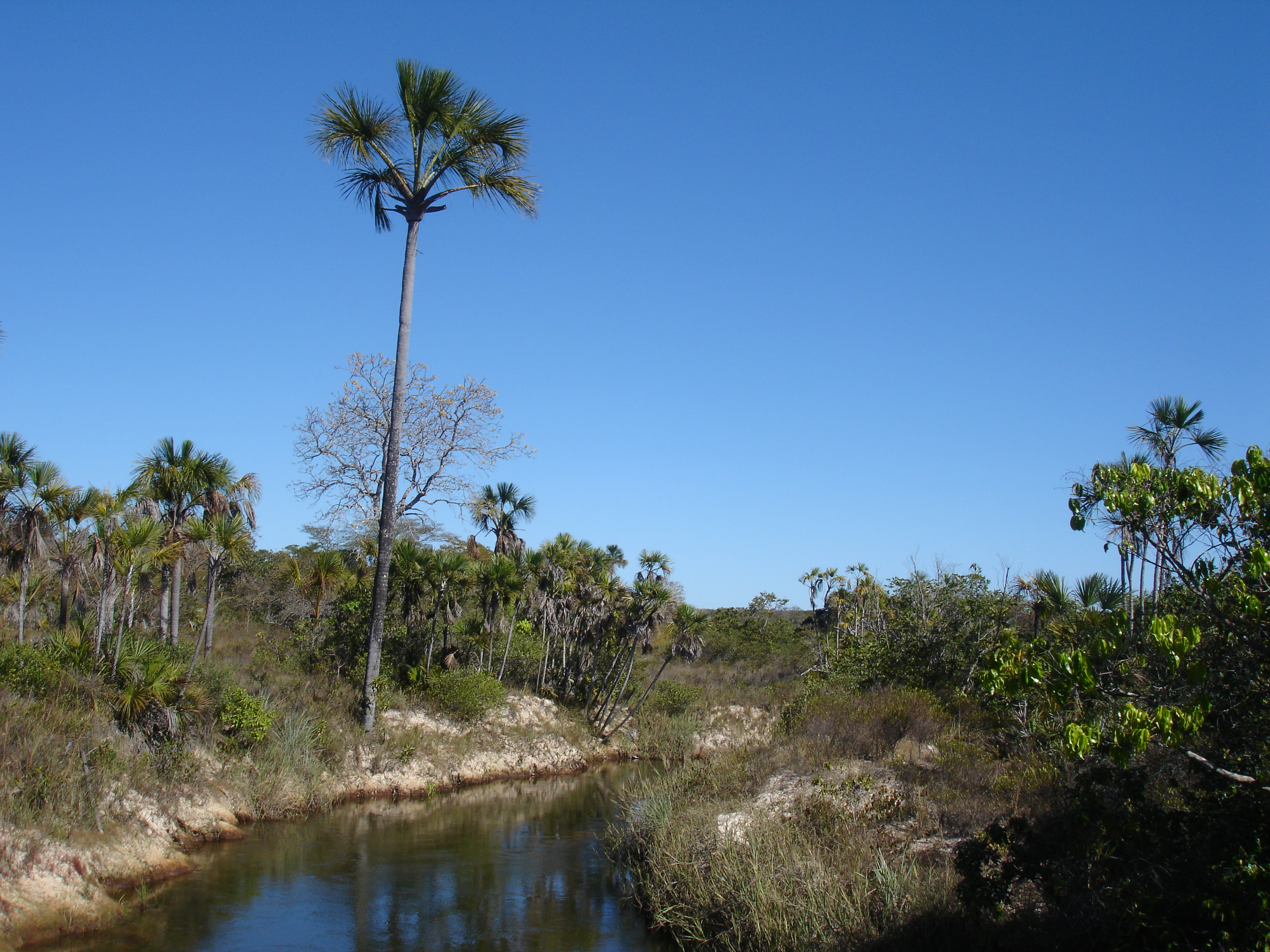
A vereda in the Grande Sertão Veredas National Park, a national park created in tribute to the book

The Devil to Pay in the Backlands (Portuguese: Grande Sertão: Veredas, "Great Backlands: Paths"; also translated as The Great Backlands and Their Paths) is a novel published in 1956 by the Brazilian writer João Guimarães Rosa.

The original title refers to the veredas, which are small paths through wetlands usually located at higher altitudes characterized by the presence of grasses and buritizais, groups of the buriti palm-tree (Mauritia flexuosa), that criss-cross the Sertão region in northern Minas Gerais as a labyrinthine net where an outsider can easily get lost, and where there is no single way to a certain place, since all paths interconnect in such a way that any road can lead anywhere. The English title refers to a later episode in the book involving an attempt to make a deal with the Devil. Most of the book's spirit is, however, lost in translation, as the Portuguese original is written in a register that is both archaic and colloquial, as well as full of the author's remarkable neologisms, which makes the aesthetics of the book a challenging task to transpose to other languages. The combination of its size, linguistic oddness and polemic themes caused a shock when it was published, but now it is widely regarded as one of the greatest works of Brazilian literature and one of the most important novels of Portuguese language literature and South American literature. The book is celebrated for its revolutionary reinvention of the Portuguese language, transforming it into a uniquely Brazilian idiom that captures the rhythms and spirit of the sertão. The novel deeply explores philosophical themes such as good and evil, free will, and the nature of existence, while portraying the sertão not only as a physical landscape but as a metaphor for the soul and identity of Brazil. Widely regarded as one of the greatest novels in world literature, it is often compared to the works of Cervantes and Joyce for its linguistic innovation and profound narrative complexity. In a 2002 poll of 100 noted writers conducted by the Bokklubben World Library, the book was named among the top 100 books of all time.

== Plot ==
Grande Sertão: Veredas is the complex story of Riobaldo, a former jagunço (mercenary or bandit) of the poor and steppe-like inland of the Rio São Francisco, known as Sertão, of the states of Minas Gerais and Bahia in the dawn of the 20th century. Now an old man and a rancher, Riobaldo tells his long story to an anonymous and silent listener coming from the city. The book is written in one long section, with no section or chapter breaks.

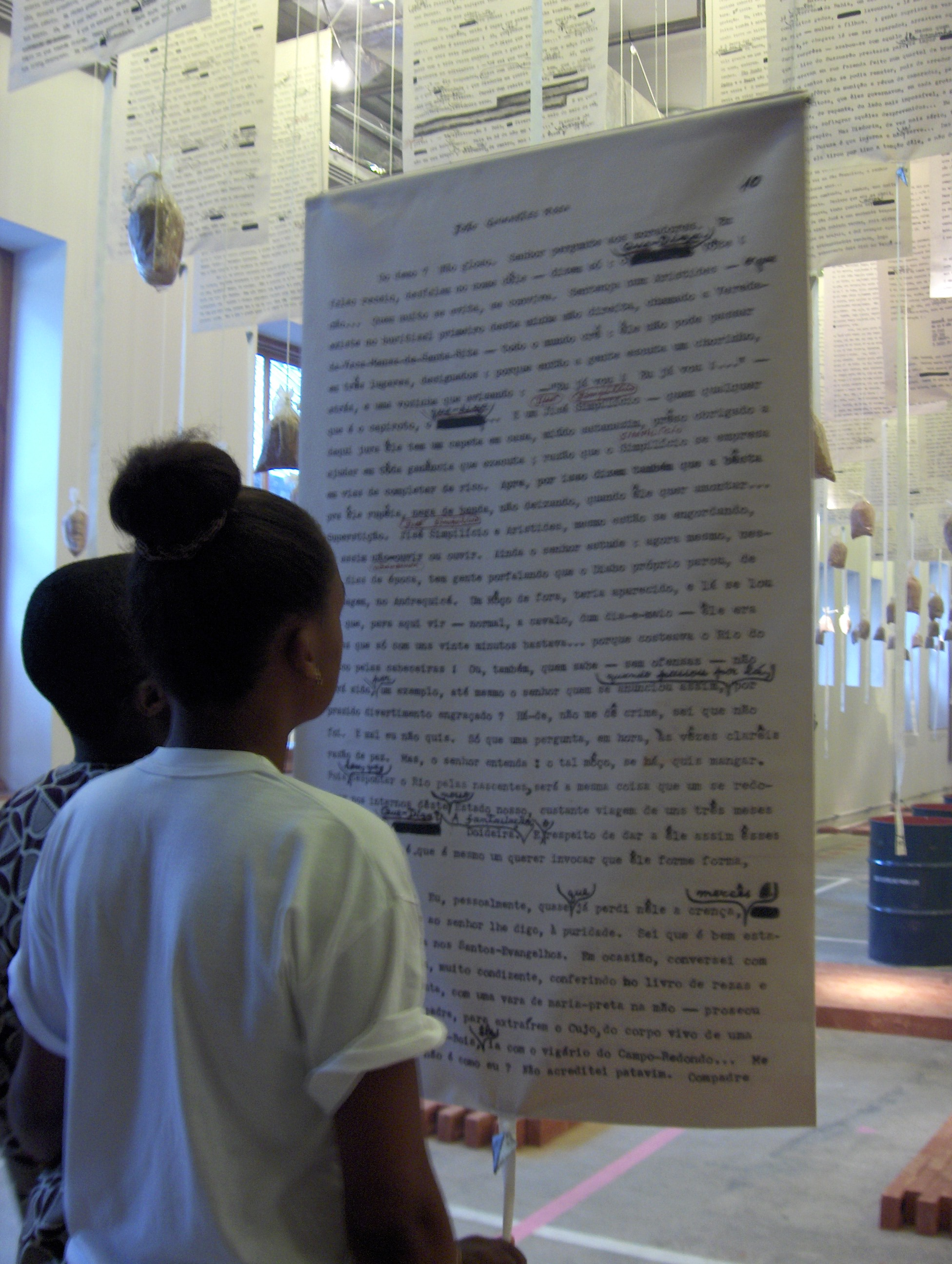
A facsimile of an original page of the book hanging in the Museum of the Portuguese Language

Riobaldo is born into a middle-class family and, unlike most of his contemporaries, receives an education. This enables him to begin his career as a tutor to a prominent local rancher, Zé Bebelo, and he watches as Zé Bebelo raises an army of his own jagunços to stamp out several of the local bandit gangs. Instead, for reasons that are never fully clear—apparently a desire for adventure—he disappears from the ranch and defects to the side of the bandits under the leadership of Joca Ramiro. Due to his excellent aim, Riobaldo becomes a valued member of the band and begins to rise in stature. In the course of the events Riobaldo gets acquainted with Diadorim, revealed later to be someone from his past who used the name, Reinaldo. Diadorim is a young, pleasant and ambivalent fellow jagunço. The two start a profound friendship, with Diadorim exerting an unusual attraction in Riobaldo. Later, Diadorim tells Riobaldo that he is the son of deceased Jagunço chief Joca Ramiro.

Ramiro's men defeat and capture Zé Bebelo, but after a short trial, Bebelo is released. The war is temporarily over, but news later comes that two of Ramiro's lieutenants, Ricardão and Hermogenes, have betrayed and murdered him. As a result, the victorious army splits in two, Riobaldo staying with the current leader, Medeiro Vaz. When Vaz dies of illness, Zé Bebelo returns from exile and takes ownership of the band (this is actually where the book begins; the previous part is told in a very lengthy retrospective). They survive a lengthy siege by Hermogenes' men, but Zé Bebelo loses the taste for fighting, and the band is idled for nearly a month in a plague-ridden village. When this happens, Riobaldo mounts a challenge and takes command of the band, sending Zé Bebelo away.

Riobaldo, who has mused on the nature of the devil intermittently since the beginning of the book, tries to make a pact with the devil. He goes to a crossroads at midnight, but is uncertain as to whether the deal has been made or not, and he remains unsure for the rest of the story. He leads his band across a hostile desert and successfully ambushes and destroys Ricardão's men and kills Ricardão. He then moves against Hermogenes but is surprised; with difficulty and heavy casualties, his army defeats Hermogenes. The climax of the book is a knife fight between the two opposing armies. In the fight, Diadorim kills Hermogenes, but is in turn killed. Only after Diadorim's death is it revealed that Diadorim was in fact a woman. Riobaldo resigns command of the jagunços and settles down to a more conventional life. The final musings of the book are regarded as some of the most beautiful fragments of Portuguese language literature.

== Television adaptation ==
In 1985, the novel was adapted for a TV-miniseries for the Brazilian network Rede Globo.

== English translations ==
The first English translation, by James L. Taylor and Harriet de Onís, was published in 1963. A second translation was undertaken by Felipe W. Martinez. Another translation, titled Vastlands: The Crossing, by Alison Entrekin, is due to come out in 2026.
