= Fisherman's Son =

Fisherman's Son or The Fisherman's Son may refer to:

- O Filho do Pescador (The Fisherman's Son), a novel by Brazilian author Antônio Gonçalves Teixeira e Sousa
- Zvejnieka dēls (Fisherman's Son), a novel by Latvian author Vilis Lācis
- The Fisherman's Son (1939 film), Latvian film by the novel of Lācis
- The Fisherman's Son (1957 film), Latvian film by the novel of Lācis
- The Fisherman's Son, a Georgian variant of the Armenian fairy tale "The Golden-Headed Fish"
- "Fisherman's Son", a track from North Country (album) by Canadian folk music group The Rankin Family
- The Fisherman's Son, a 1959 novel by American writer Eleanor Frances Lattimore
