= Joaquim Antônio de Arruda, Baron of Atibaia =

Brazilian nobleman

Joaquim Antônio de Arruda
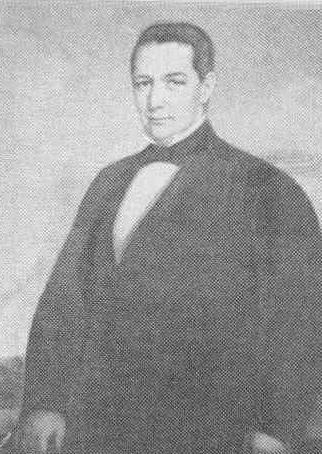
- Born: November 14, 1809; Campinas, São Paulo, Empire of Brazil
- Died: June 20, 1881 (aged 71); Campinas, São Paulo, Empire of Brazil
- Occupations: Landowner, financier, politician
- Political party: Conservative

Joaquim Antônio de Arruda, Baron of Atibaia (14 November 1809 – 20 June 1881) was a Brazilian nobleman, investor, and politician. A wealthy landowner who made his fortune cultivating coffee, he was the first person born in Campinas to receive a noble title.

Arruda was a shareholder of the Companhia Paulista de Estradas de Ferro and helped establish the Companhia Mogiana de Estradas de Ferro (pt). He was part of the Sociedade Culto à Ciência, which founded the traditional Colégio Culto à Ciência.
