= Joaquim Bonifácio do Amaral, Viscount of Indaiatuba =

Brazilian nobleman

Joaquim Bonifácio do Amaral
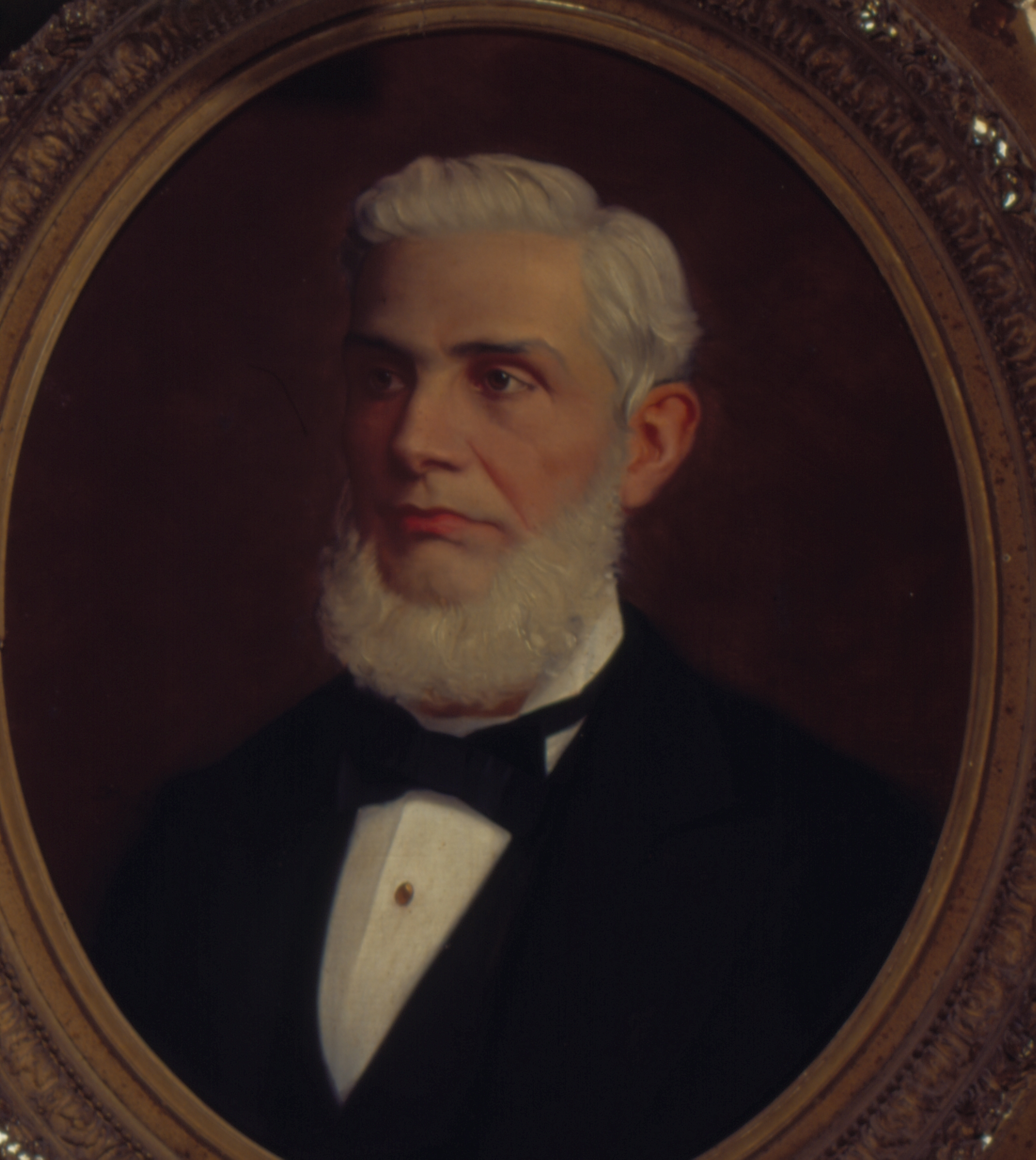
- Born: September 3, 1815; Campinas, São Paulo, Empire of Brazil
- Died: November 6, 1884 (aged 69); Campinas, São Paulo, Empire of Brazil
- Occupations: Coffee baron, politician
- Political party: Liberal Party
- Movement: Abolitionism

Joaquim Bonifácio do Amaral, Viscount of Indaiatuba (September 3, 1815 – November 6, 1884) was a Brazilian nobleman, landowner, and politician. A pioneering abolitionist, he is best known for having replaced slave labor on his farm with Italian and German workers, in an early experiment with a remunerated workforce on coffee plantations.

A veteran who took part in the Battle of Venda Grande, helping the Imperial forces defeat the insurgent liberals, he was one of the founders of the traditional Colégio Culto à Ciência and a knight of the Order of the Rose.
