= Joaquim Egídio de Sousa Aranha =

Brazilian nobleman

Joaquim Egydio de Souza Aranha
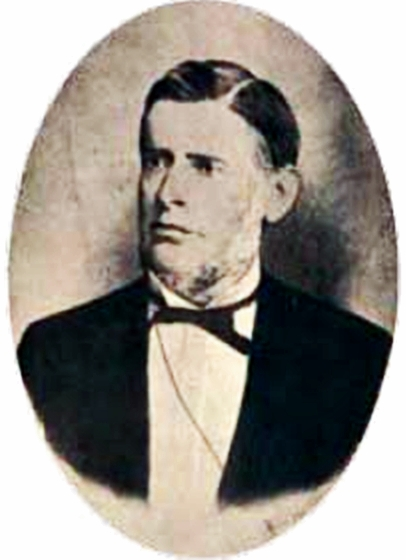
- Portrait, c. 1865
- Born: 19 March 1821; Campinas, São Paulo, Empire of Brazil
- Died: 19 May 1893 (aged 72); São Paulo, São Paulo, Brazil
- Occupations: Financist, banker, landowner, politician
- Political party: Liberal
- Parent(s): Maria Luzia de Sousa Aranha, Baroness of Campinas

Joaquim Egydio de Souza Aranha, Marquis of Três Rios (19 March 1821 – 19 May 1893) was a Brazilian nobleman, landowner, banker, and politician.

A prominent figure of the Liberal Party, he served three terms as a municipal councilor in Campinas. As a financier, he invested heavily in the Companhia Paulista de Estradas de Ferro and participated in the establishment of the Banco Comind. Additionally, he was a benefactor of the Irmandade da Santa Casa de Misericórdia de São Paulo, and helped found the traditional Colégio Culto à Ciência.

Aranha's manor housed the Polytechnic School of São Paulo for several years, until it was severely damaged in bombardments during the São Paulo Revolt of 1924.
