= Partido Democrata Cristão =

Partido Democrata Cristão may refer to:

- Partido Democrata Cristão, Portuguese for Christian Democratic Party (Timor-Leste)
- Partido Democrata Cristão (PDC), Portuguese for Christian Democratic Party (Brazil)

== See also ==
- Partido Demócrata Cristiano (disambiguation)
- Christian Democratic Party (disambiguation)
- List of Christian democratic parties
