= Diogo de Vasconcelos =

Brazilian city

Coordinates: 20°29′16″S 43°11′52″W

- Municipality
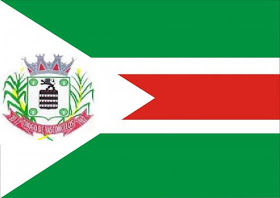
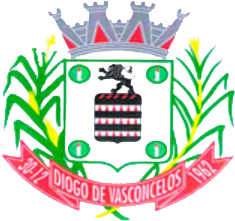
- Flag Coat of arms
- Interactive map of Diogo de Vasconcelos
- Country: Brazil
- State: Minas Gerais
- Region: Southeast
- Time zone: UTC−3 (BRT)

Diogo de Vasconcelos is a city in the municipality of Ouro Preto in the Brazilian state of Minas Gerais. As of 2020, the estimated population was 3,790.

== See also ==
- List of municipalities in Minas Gerais
