= Aillaud =

Aillaud is a surname. Notable people with the name include:

- Émile Aillaud (1902–1988), French architect
- Gilles Aillaud (1928–2005), French painter, set decorator and scenographer
- León Aillaud (1880–1936), Interim Governor of the Mexican State of Veracruz
- Thérèse Aillaud (1931–2015), French politician

== See also ==
- Tours Aillaud, is a group of residential buildings located in Nanterre, in the inner suburbs of Paris, France
