= Ernesto Carneiro Ribeiro =

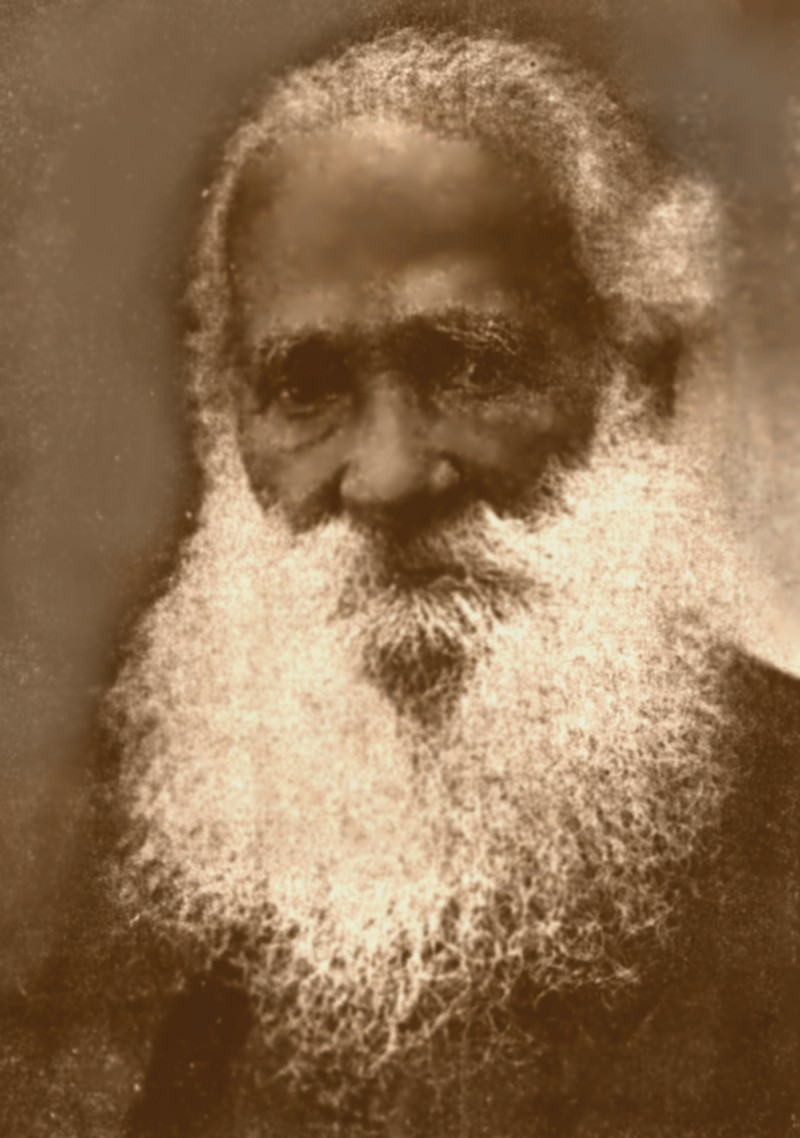
- Born: September 12, 1839; Itaparica, Bahia, Brazil
- Died: November 13, 1920 (aged 81); Salvador, Brazil

Ernesto Carneiro Ribeiro ( 12 September 1839 — 13 November 1920) was a Brazilian physician, teacher, linguist and educator. His main work is Serões Gramaticais, a grammarbook of the Portuguese language.

== Biography ==
Carneiro Ribeiro was born in 1839 in the Itaparica Island, at the state of Bahia, where he had basic education. He moved to the state capital Salvador, where he attended, humanities preparatory classes for the Faculty of Medicine of Bahia. He graduated in 1864, and received the title of Baron of Vila Nova, on his biomedical researches.

In 1874 Ribeiro founded the Colégio da Bahia, with funding of the Brazilian Empire; the school ran until 1883. In the following year he founded a school bearing his name.

When Brazil became a republic, in 1899, Carneiro Ribeiro joined the commission formed by governor Manuel Vitorino to elaborate a new educational plan.

== Civil Code revision controversy ==
In 1902 Carneiro Ribeiro had the task, under the Minister of Justice J. J. Seabra, of reviewing the project of the new Civil Code presented by Clóvis Beviláqua. The legislation would substitute the older, Colonial-era Ordenações filipinas (Philippine Ordinations).

For political reasons – Seabra was his political adversary in Bahia — jurist Rui Barbosa, who was Ribeiro's pupil, published his criticism about the revision in newspaper articles, criticizing the code's writing style, not in conformity of what was considered grammatically correct. ( "A Redacção do Projecto do Codigo Civil e a Réplica do Dr. Ruy Barbosa pelo Dr. Ernesto Carneiro Ribeiro - lente jubilado do governador da Bahia, Bahia, 1905, 899 pages).

Ribeiro answered Barbosa by laying out and defending the peculiarities of the Brazilian Portuguese language – differently of the conservative European-based grammars existing in Brazil. The quarrel between Ribeiro and Barbosa generated a great deal of controversy at the time.
