= Antônio Ferreira Cesarino Júnior =

Brazilian academic

Antônio Ferreira Cesarino Júnior (16 March 1906 – 10 March 1992) was a Brazilian jurist and professor at the University of São Paulo (USP). He was the precursor of the labor law in Brazil, with the publication of the first books on the subject: Brazilian Social Law (1940) and Labor Law Procedure (1942). He was an innovator in legal education, setting up courses on labour law, as well as demanding and orientating his students to do internships in trade unions, in regional work inspection stations, in the National Institute of Social Insurance (Brazil) or in human resources departments of private and public companies. He founded the Brazilian Partido Democrata Cristão (Christian Democrat Party) in July 1945. Later he abandoned this idea and regretted his involvement in politics. He established in São Paulo, in 1954, the first World Congress of Labour Law (ILO). As the first professor of Labour Law in Brazil, he was inherently the founder of the Social Law (today's Labour Law) Department at the University of São Paulo in 1938. He trained Brazil's first generations of labor lawyers and judges and was the author of several books and countless articles on labour law and occupational health in Brazilian and foreign magazines.
