= José Olympio =

Brazilian book editor

José Olympio Pereira Filho (December 10, 1902 – May 30, 1990) was a Brazilian bookseller and editor. He founded Livraria José Olympio Editora, which published writers such as João Guimarães Rosa, Jorge Amado, José Lins do Rego, and Graciliano Ramos.

== Biography ==
Born in the rural town of Batatais into a large, impoverished family, Olympio left school at a very young age and was largely self-taught. As a teenager, he moved to São Paulo hoping to enroll at the city's Faculty of Law, but instead began working as an assistant at the bookshop Garraux, then a cultural gathering place, where he came in contact with modernist writers and artists, including Mário de Andrade, Oswald de Andrade, Menotti del Picchia, and Plínio Salgado.

In the late 1920s, Olympio developed an interest in rare books, acquiring two private collections, one of which had been amassed by the bibliophile Alfredo Pujol during his travels throughout Europe. In 1929, Olympio established his own bookshop in São Paulo, and in 1931 he founded his publishing house, José Olympio Editora. In 1934, he relocated to Rio de Janeiro, at the time Brazil's capital.
