= Antônio Gonçalves Teixeira e Sousa =

Brazilian poet, novelist and playwright (1812–1861)

- A drawing depicting Sousa
- Born: March 28, 1812; Cabo Frio, Rio de Janeiro, State of Brazil, Portuguese Empire
- Died: December 1, 1861 (aged 49); Rio de Janeiro, Brazil
- Occupations: Poet, playwright, novelist
- Writing career
- Notable work: O Filho do Pescador
- Movement: Romanticism

Antônio Gonçalves Teixeira e Sousa (March 28, 1812 – December 1, 1861) was a Brazilian poet, novelist and playwright, whose novel O Filho do Pescador (The Fisherman's Son) is considered to be the first Romantic novel in Brazil.

== Life ==
Antônio Gonçalves Teixeira e Sousa was born in Cabo Frio, in 1812, to Portuguese Manuel Gonçalves and black Ana Teixeira de Jesus. His family was very poor, what made him quit his studies and become a carpenter. He exercised the profession in Itaboraí, moving then to Rio de Janeiro and later returning to Cabo Frio. In there, he discovered that his four older brothers died, and was alone in the world, with very sparse goods that his father gave to him.

He then decides to return studying. His teacher was the surgeon and poet Inácio Cardoso da Silva, whose poetry was compiled and then published by Sousa.

After concluding his studies, he moved definitely to Rio de Janeiro, dying there in 1861.

== Works ==
- Cornélia (1840)
- Cânticos Líricos (1841–42)
- O Filho do Pescador (1843)
- Os Três Dias de um Noivado (1844)
- Tardes de um Pintor, ou As Intrigas de um Jesuíta (1847)
- A Independência do Brasil (1847–55)
- Gonzaga, ou A Conjuração de Tiradentes (1848–51)
- A Providência (1854)
- O Cavaleiro Teutônico, ou A Freira de Marienburg (1855)
- As Fatalidades de Dous Jovens (1856)
- Maria, ou A Menina Roubada (1859)
