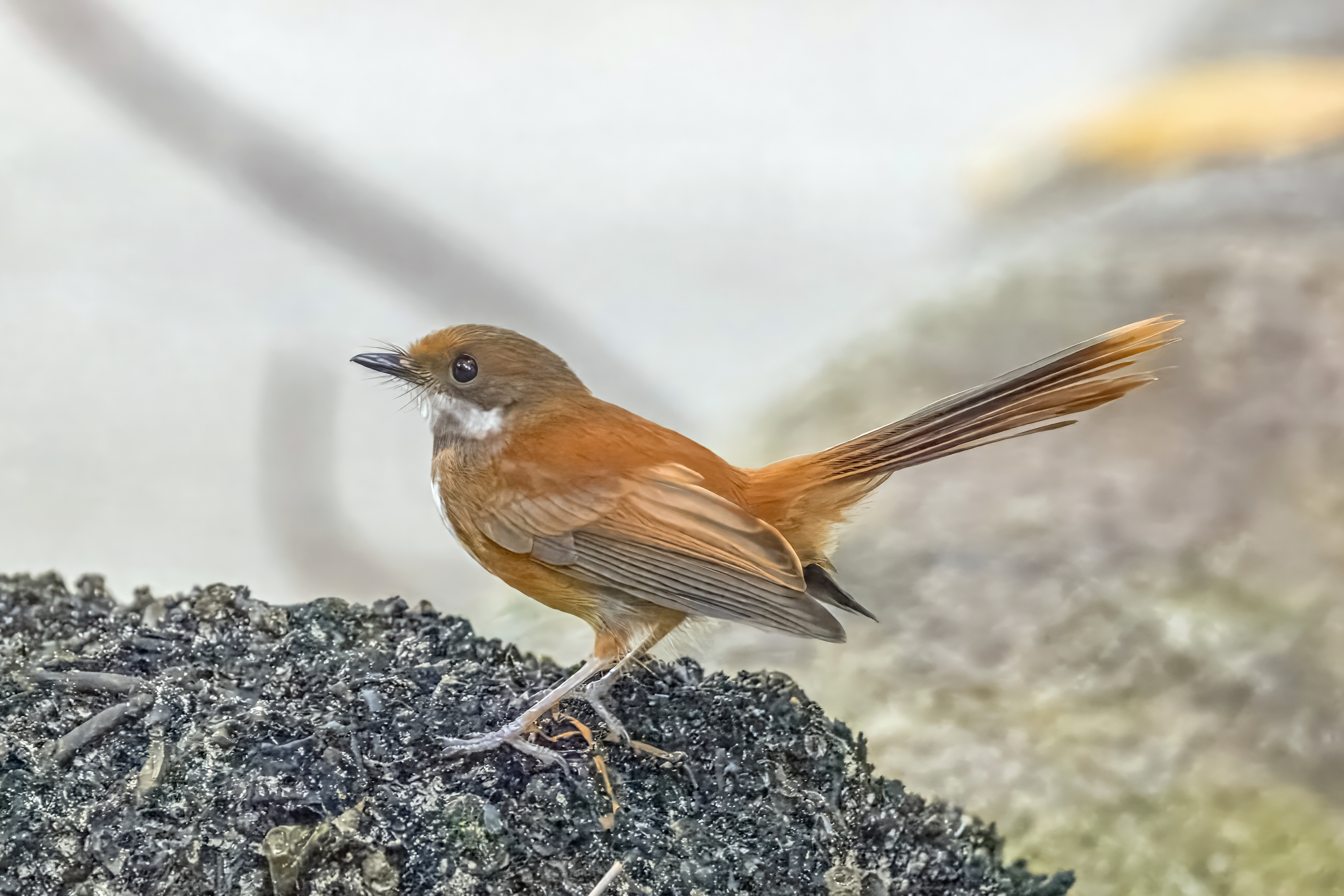

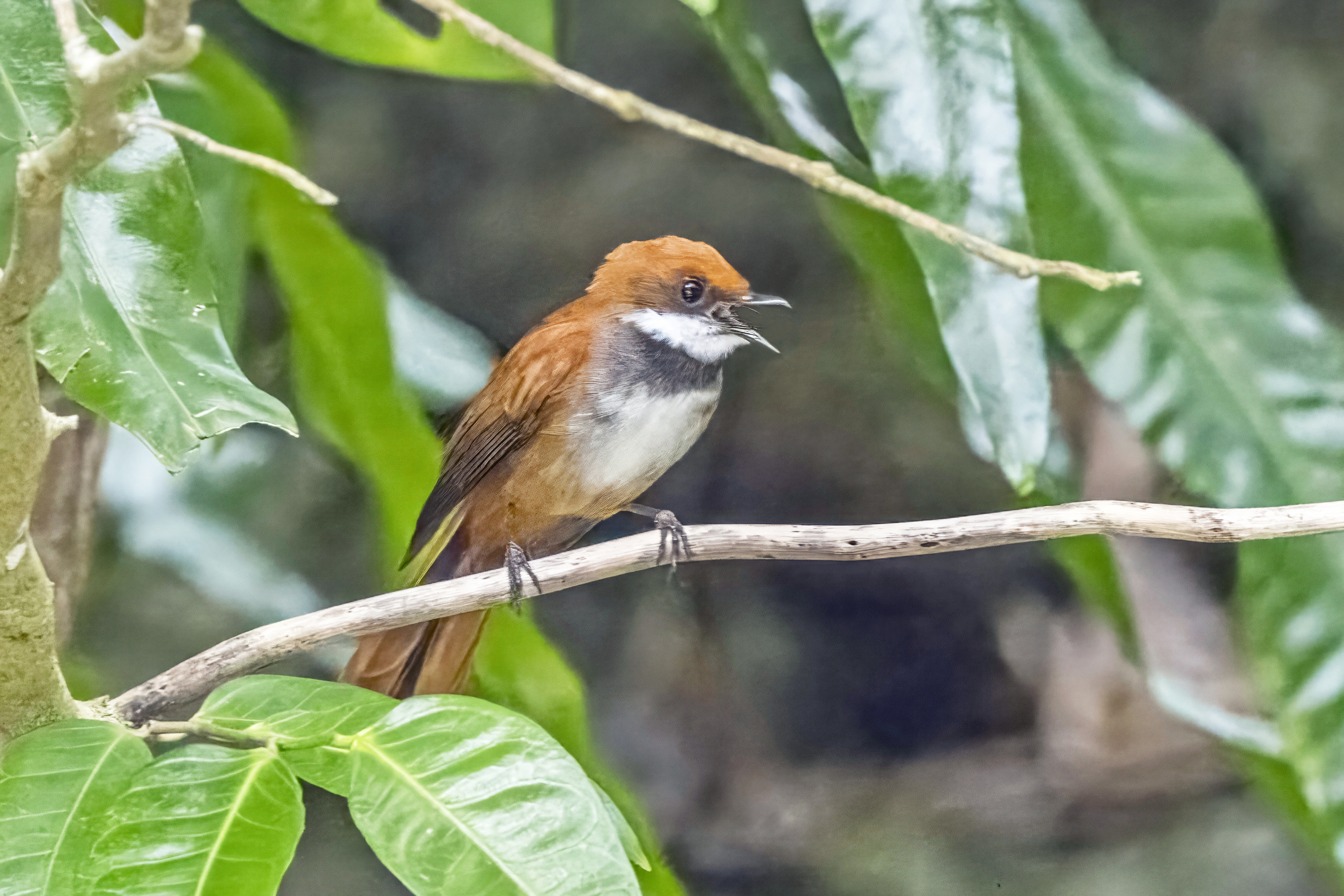
- Both in the Rock Islands

Conservation status
- Least Concern (IUCN 3.1)

Scientific classification
- Kingdom: Animalia
- Phylum: Chordata
- Class: Aves
- Order: Passeriformes
- Family: Rhipiduridae
- Genus: Rhipidura
- Species: R. lepida

Binomial name
- Rhipidura lepida Hartlaub & Finsch, 1868

= Palau fantail =

Species of bird

The Palau fantail (Rhipidura lepida) is a species of bird in the fantail family Rhipiduridae. It is endemic to Palau.

== Taxonomy and systematics ==
The species is closely related to and forms a superspecies with the long-tailed fantail of the Tanimbar Islands, the Sulawesi fantail of Sulawesi, the tawny-backed fantail of Buru and the streak-breasted fantail of Seram, all in Indonesia. The specific name, lepida, was given to the species when it was described by Hartlaub and Finsch in 1868, and is Latin, lepidus for 'charming'.

== Description ==
The Palau fantail is a typical fantail, short-bodied and long-tailed, measuring 18 cm (7.1 in). The crown, nape, back and upper tail are cinnamon. The throat and malar are white and the breast is black, the wings are black edged with cinnamon, and the belly is white. The tail is black tipped with rufous. The sexes are the same in plumage but the females are slightly smaller. Juveniles have brown upperparts, and dingy white throats.

== Habitat and distribution ==
The Palau fantail is endemic to Palau in the Pacific Ocean, where it can be found on Babeldaob (the largest island), Koror, Urukthapel, Eil Malk and Peleliu. The species is found in forests, including mature primary forests, secondary growth and forest patches in ravines in savannah. It will occasionally enter scrub and is found, albeit infrequently, in mangrove forests. The species is non-migratory.

== Behaviour ==
The Palau fantail is an active feeder, hopping and flying while searching for prey, which can be caught in the air from or gleaned from vegetation. It moves through the subcanopy and undergrowth of the forest, occasionally, taking prey from tree trunks and rocks.

Very little is known about its breeding behaviour. Its nest is a tightly woven cup with a trailing tail set in a fork in a branch.

== Status and conservation ==
The Palau fantail is not considered to be threatened with extinction. It is a restricted range species, being only found in Palau, but can be common within its range, and is thought to have increased in numbers since the 1930-1940s. It is one of the more common forest birds in Palau, and is listed as least concern by the IUCN.
