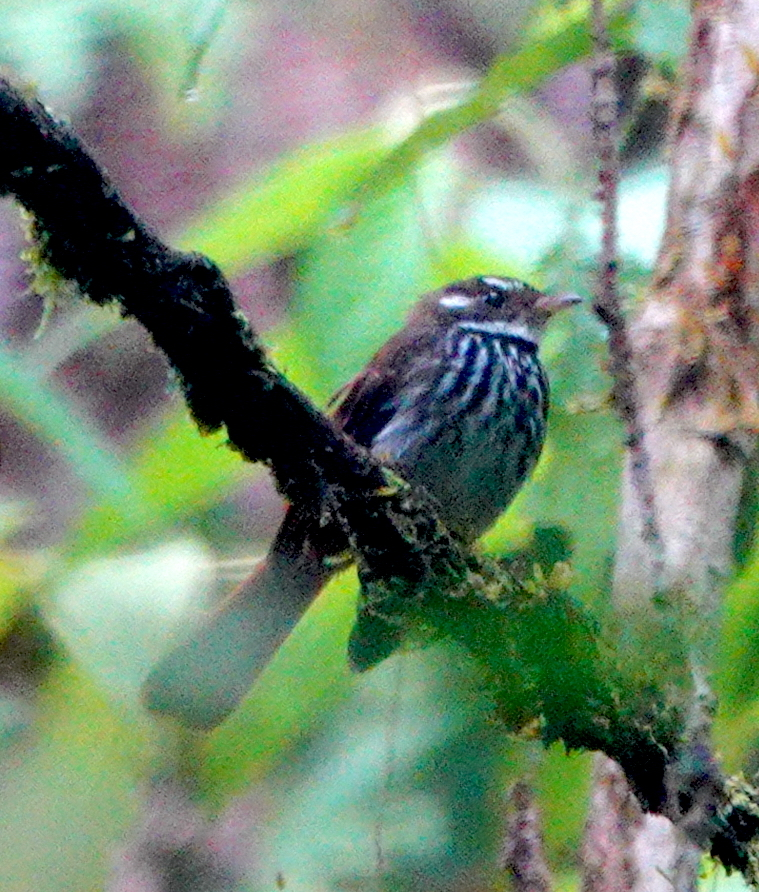

Conservation status
- Least Concern (IUCN 3.1)

Scientific classification
- Kingdom: Animalia
- Phylum: Chordata
- Class: Aves
- Order: Passeriformes
- Family: Rhipiduridae
- Genus: Rhipidura
- Species: R. dedemi

Binomial name
- Rhipidura dedemi van Oort, 1911
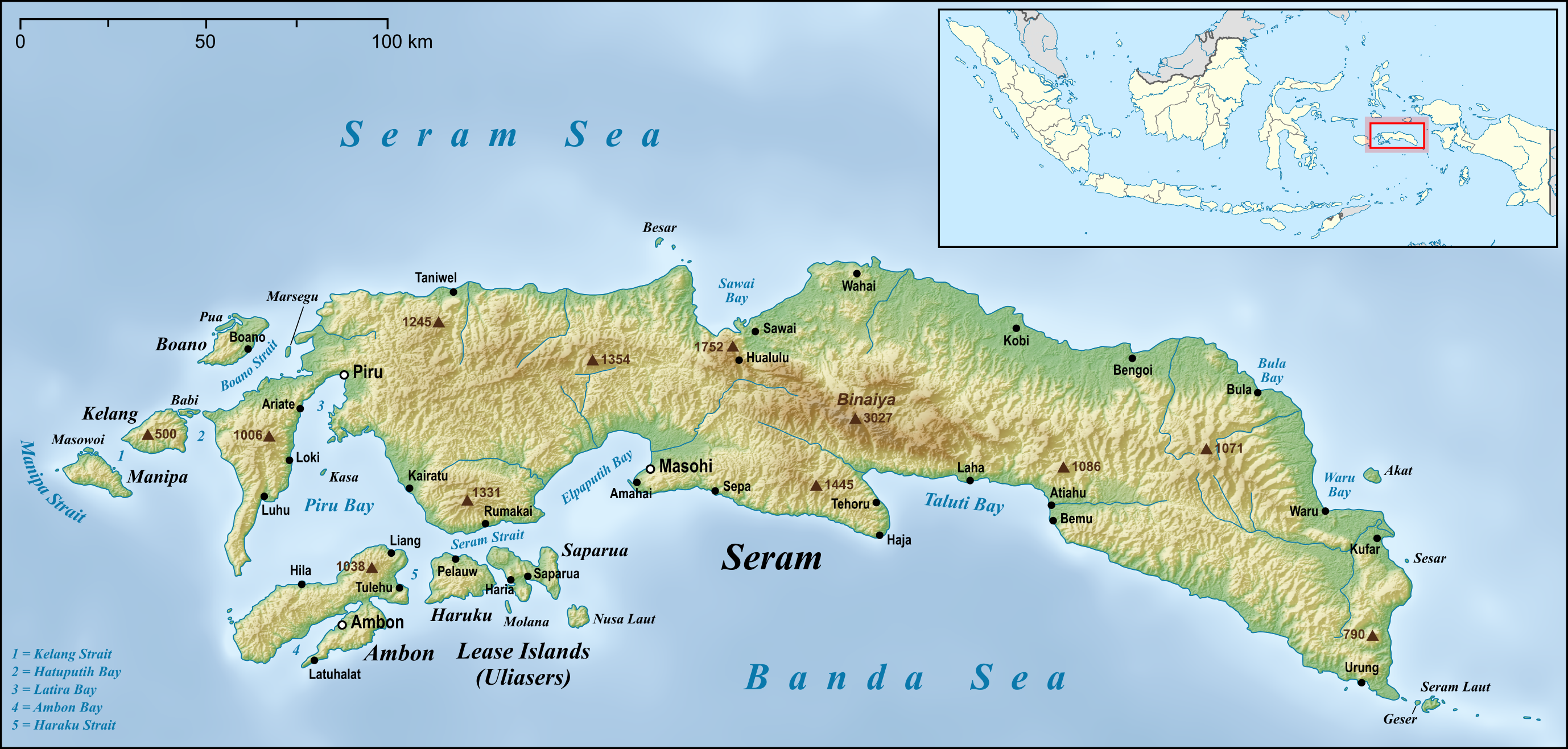

= Streak-breasted fantail =

Species of bird

The streak-breasted fantail (Rhipidura dedemi) is a species of bird in the family Rhipiduridae. It is endemic to Indonesia, where it occurs in Seram Island. Its natural habitats are subtropical or tropical moist lowland forests and subtropical or tropical moist montane forests.

== Systematics ==
The species is closely related to and forms a superspecies with the long-tailed fantail of the Tanimbar Islands, the Sulawesi fantail of Sulawesi, the tawny-backed fantail of Buru and the Palau fantail of Palau, all in Indonesia.
