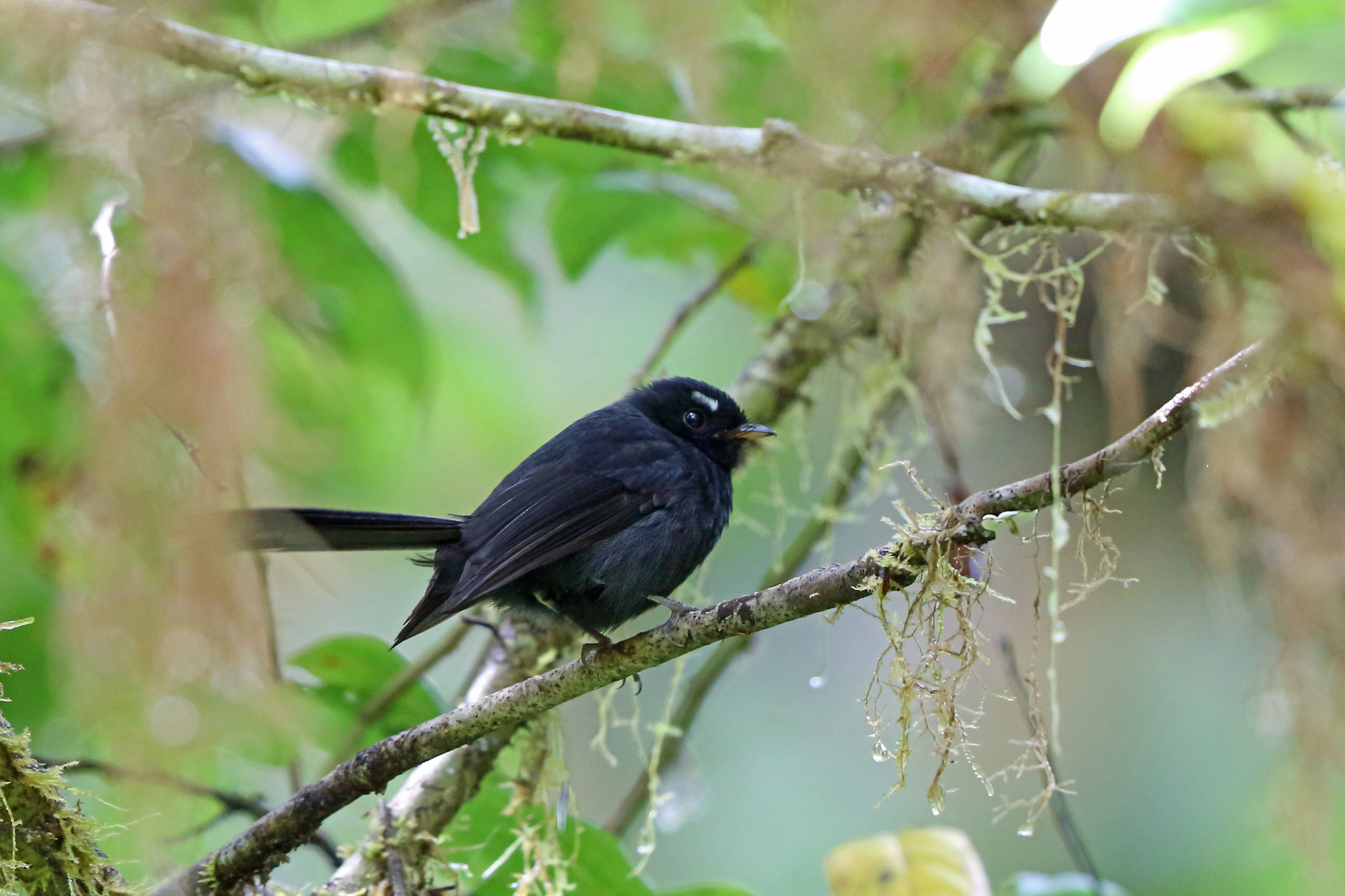
- Male
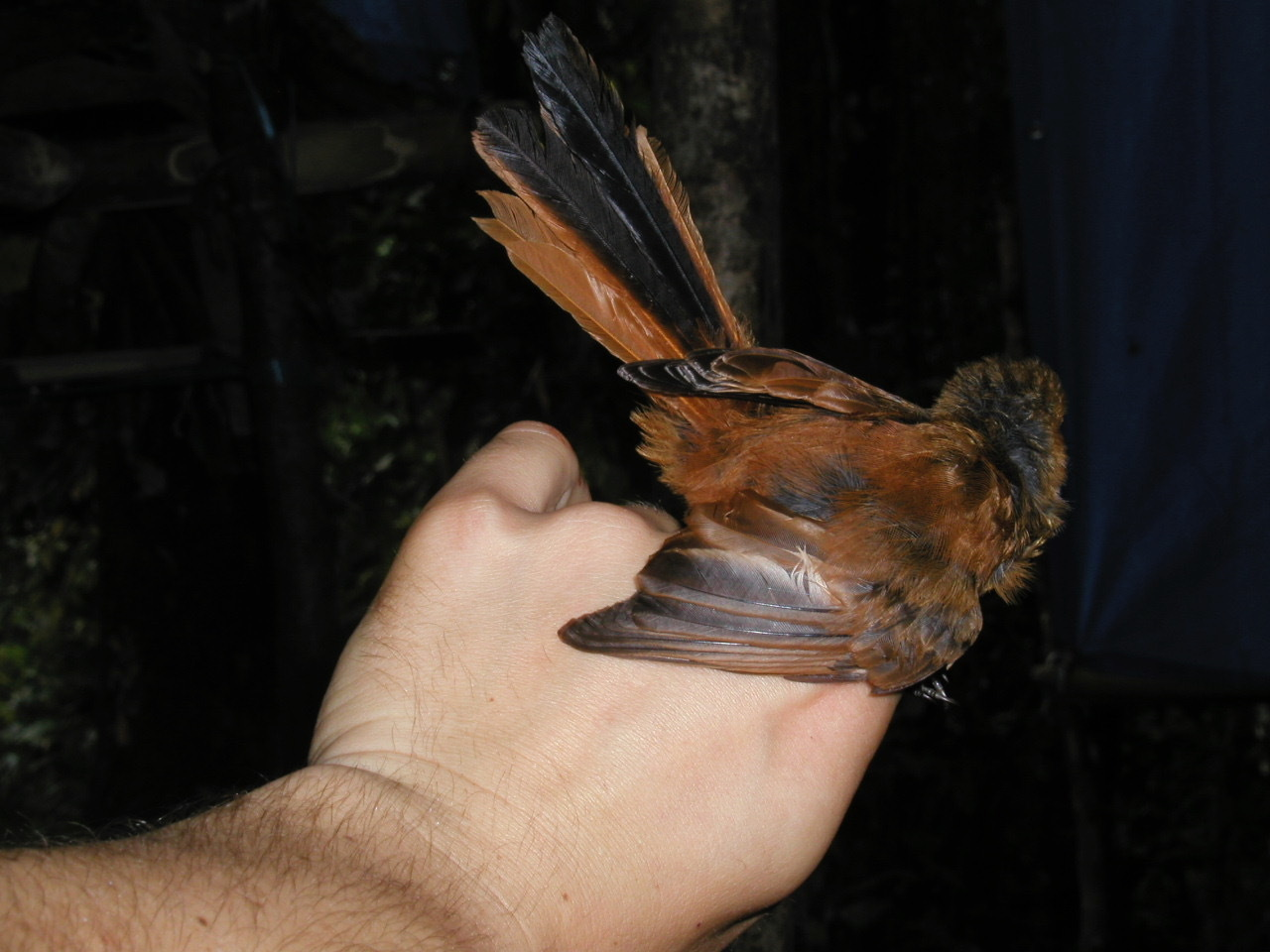
- Female

Conservation status
- Least Concern (IUCN 3.1)

Scientific classification
- Kingdom: Animalia
- Phylum: Chordata
- Class: Aves
- Order: Passeriformes
- Family: Rhipiduridae
- Genus: Rhipidura
- Species: R. atra

Binomial name
- Rhipidura atra Salvadori, 1876

= Black fantail =

Species of bird from New Guinea

The black fantail (Rhipidura atra) is a species of bird in the family Rhipiduridae. It is endemic to the highlands of New Guinea and the nearby island of Waigeo. The species was named by Italian naturalist Tommaso Salvadori in 1876, who gave it the specific name atra for the Latin word for dull black. Two subspecies have been described, the widespread nominate race R. a. atra, and R. a. vulpes of the Cyclops Mountains. R. a. vulpes was described in 1931 by Ernst Mayr, who named it from the rufous colour of foxes. Whithin the genus Rhipidura the closest relative of the black fantail is uncertain, a 2009 study of the genetics of the family found 6 well defined clades within the fantails but could not place this species with any of them.

The black fantail is named from the colour of the male, which has almost entirely black plumage, except for a small white supraorbital spot above each eye, and some white on the underwing coverts. The bill and legs are also black, and the iris is dark brown. The female is quite different, with rufous upperparts, rusty-orange underparts, and a rufous tail except for the two central tail feathers which are black. Immature birds resemble females. The males of subspecies R. a. vulpes are identical to the nominate race, but the females are brighter in colour.

The natural habitat of the black fantail is the dense understory of tropical moist montane forests from 700–3,200 m (2,300–10,500 ft), most commonly from 1,000–2,150 m (3,280–7,050 ft). At higher altitudes it is replaced by the dimorphic fantail although considerable overlap has been detected.

The black fantail feeds on insects, including beetles and caterpillars in the understory and undergrowth of the forest. Most prey is caught in the air but a quarter of prey taken is gleaned from the wing off vegetation. The species will also join mixed-species feeding flocks.

The breeding season of the black fantail is late-dry and early wet season, and late wet season. Nests are simple cups of plant fibres held together with spiderweb and placed on a fork in a twig. Early accounts stated the nests were placed close to the ground, but nests have also been recorded up to 12 m (39 ft) off the ground in the forest mid-storey. A single egg is laid, which is white with purple-grey and olive-brown speckles. Both parents incubate the egg and share the responsibility jointly. The pair will defend their nest from larger birds including black-eared catbirds and crinkle-collared manucodes.
