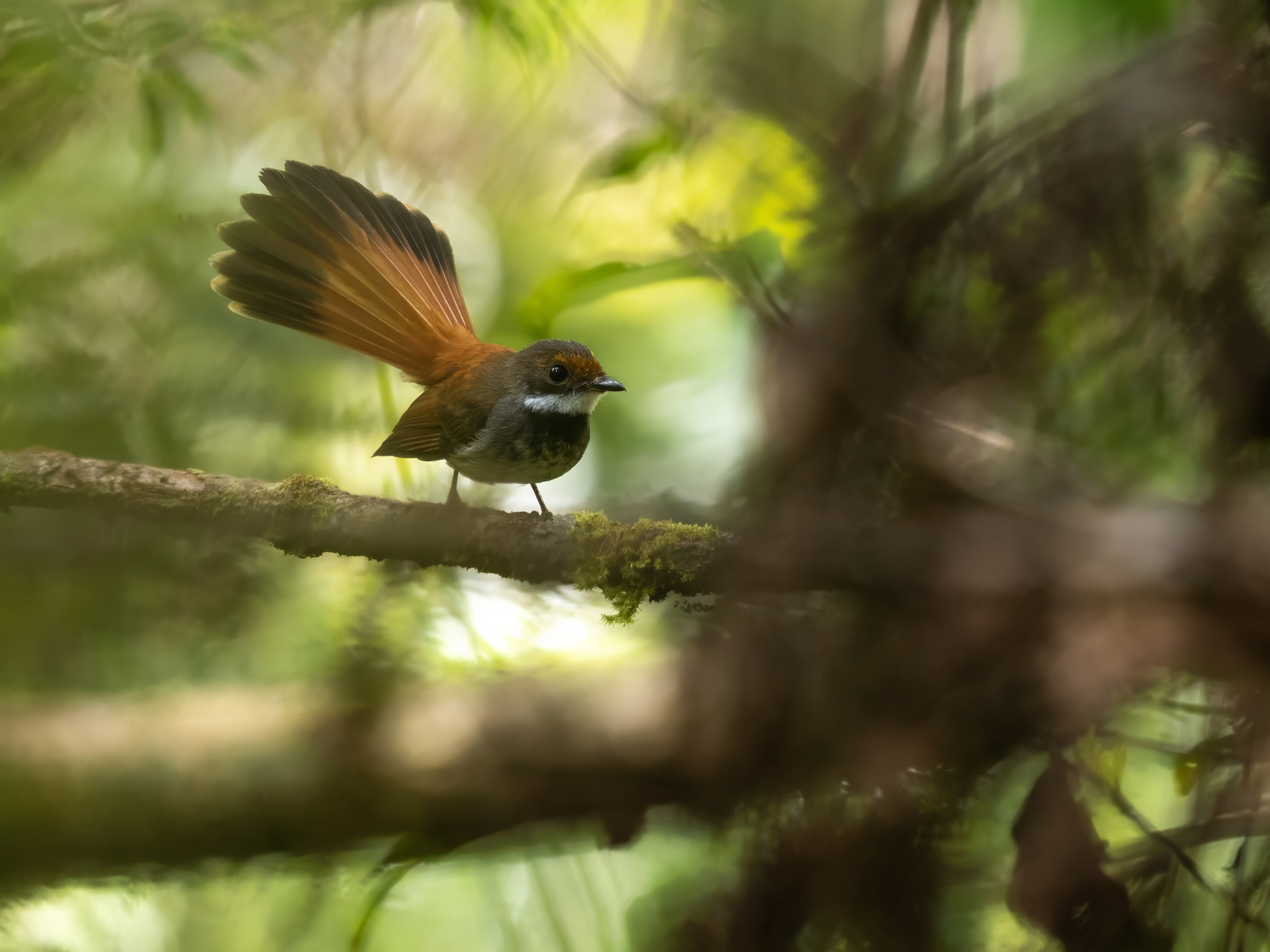

Scientific classification
- Kingdom: Animalia
- Phylum: Chordata
- Class: Aves
- Order: Passeriformes
- Family: Rhipiduridae
- Genus: Rhipidura
- Species: R. sulaensis

Binomial name
- Rhipidura sulaensis Neumann, 1939

= Taliabu fantail =

Species of bird

The Taliabu fantail (Rhipidura sulaensis) is a species of bird in the family Rhipiduridae. It is endemic to Taliabu in Indonesia. Its natural habitats are subtropical or tropical moist lowland forests and subtropical or tropical moist montane forests. It was considered conspecific with the rusty-bellied fantail.
