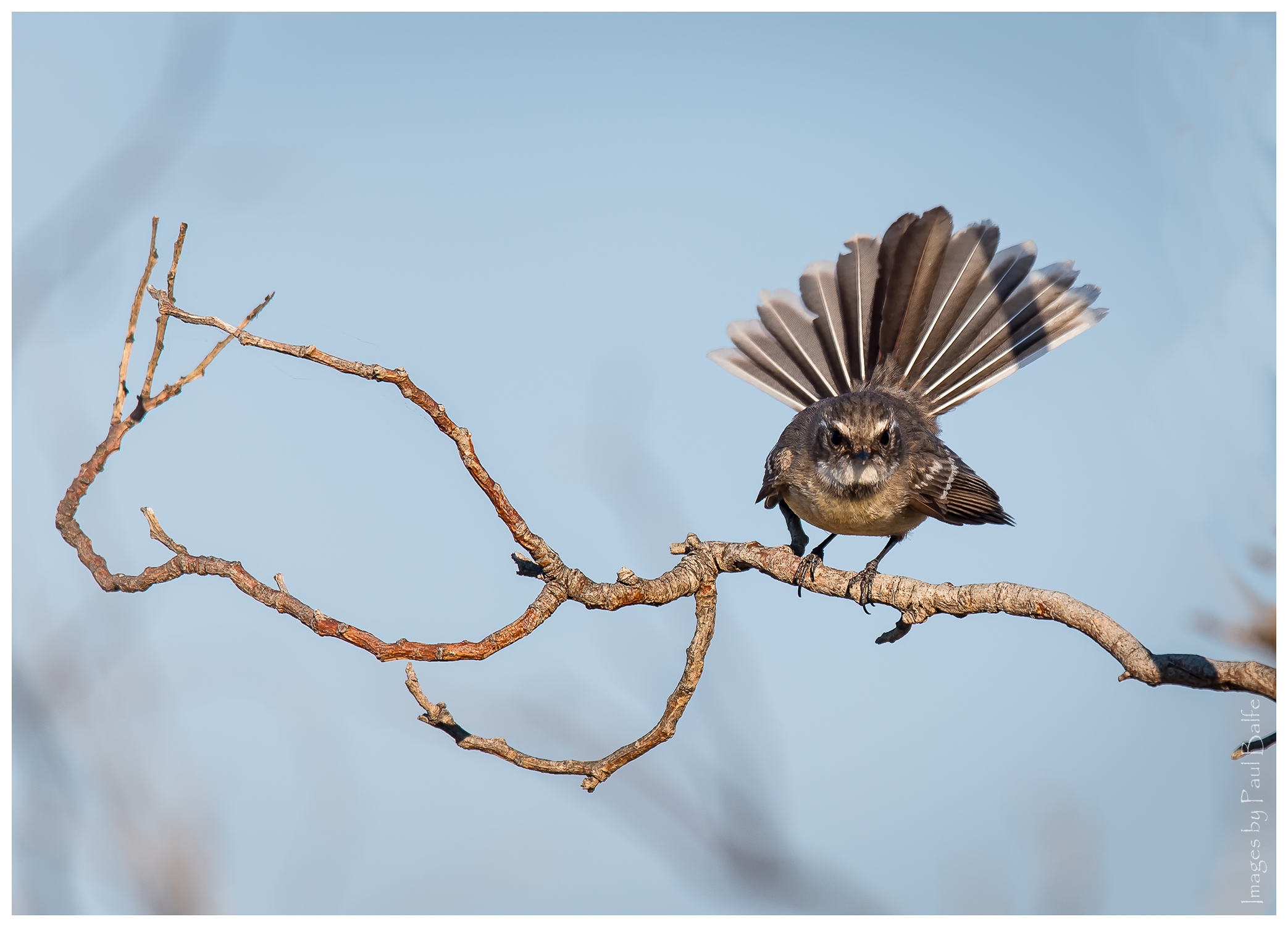

Conservation status
- Least Concern (IUCN 3.1)

Scientific classification
- Kingdom: Animalia
- Phylum: Chordata
- Class: Aves
- Order: Passeriformes
- Family: Rhipiduridae
- Genus: Rhipidura
- Species: R. phasiana

Binomial name
- Rhipidura phasiana De Vis, 1885

= Mangrove fantail =

Species of bird

The mangrove fantail (Rhipidura phasiana) is a species of bird in the family Rhipiduridae. It is found in the Aru Islands and along the coast of southeastern New Guinea, western and northern Australia.

Its natural habitat is subtropical or tropical mangrove forests.
