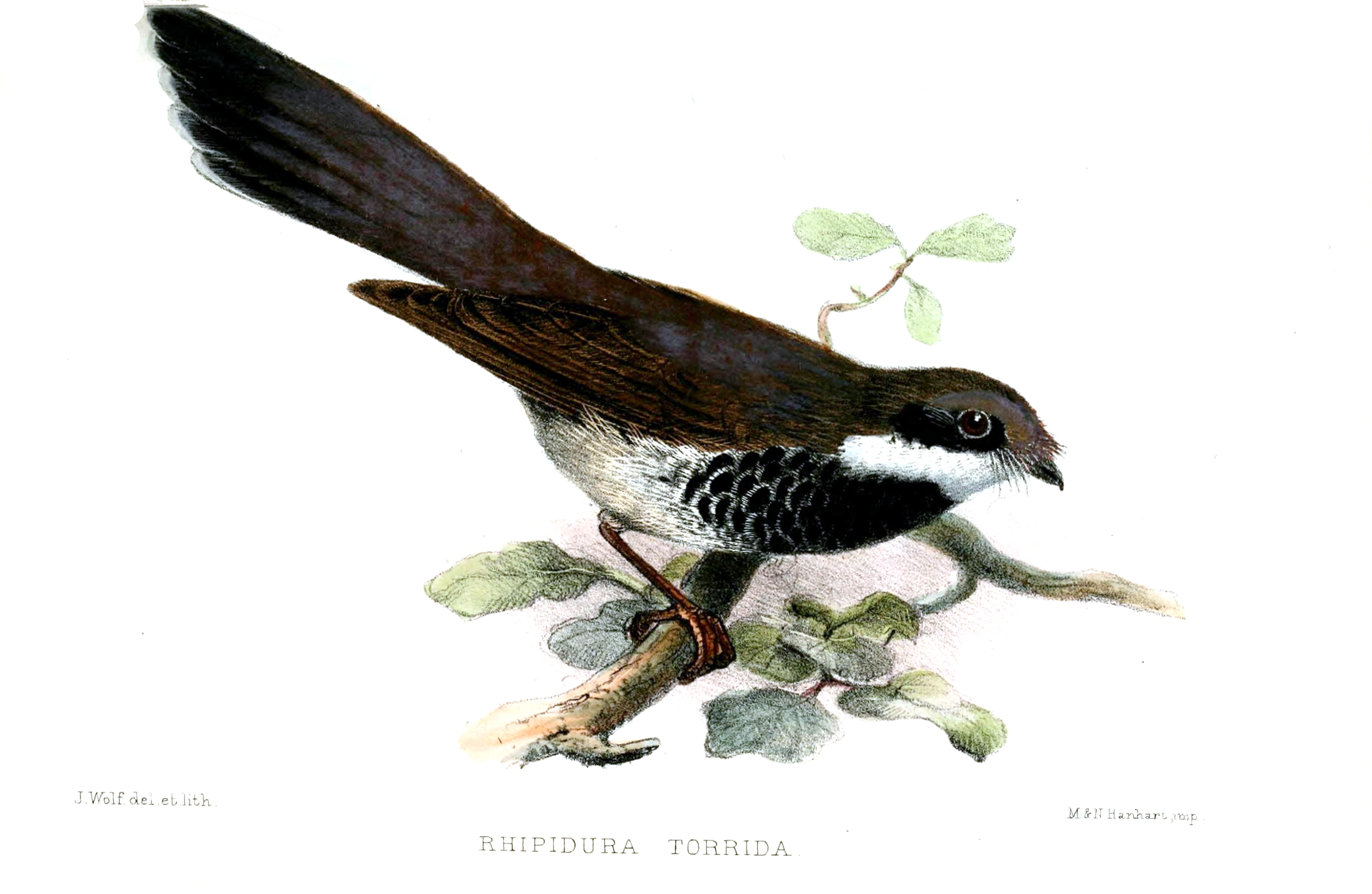
- Illustration by Joseph Wolf that accompanied Wallace's description

Scientific classification
- Kingdom: Animalia
- Phylum: Chordata
- Class: Aves
- Order: Passeriformes
- Family: Rhipiduridae
- Genus: Rhipidura
- Species: R. torrida

Binomial name
- Rhipidura torrida Wallace, 1865

= Gilolo fantail =

Species of bird

The Gilolo fantail (Rhipidura torrida) is a species of bird in the family Rhipiduridae that is endemic to the northern Maluku Islands from Halmahera south to the Obi. The English "Gilolo" is an earlier name for Halmahera. The Gilolo fantail was formerly considered to be a subspecies of the Australian rufous fantail (Rhipidura rufifrons).

== Taxonomy ==
The Gilolo fantail was formally described and illustrated in 1865 by the British naturalist Alfred Russel Wallace based on a specimen collected on the summit of the Gamalama volcano on Ternate in the Maluku Islands. He placed it with the other fantails in the genus Rhipidura and coined the binomial name Rhipidura torrida. The specific epithet is from Latin meaning "scorched", "torrid" or "burning". The Gilolo fantail was formerly considered as a subspecies of the rufous fantail (now the Australian rufous fantail) (Rhipidura rufifrons) but is now treated as a separate species based on differences in the plumage, voice and genetics. The species is monotypic: no subspecies are recognised.
