= Santa Cruz fantail =

Conservation status
- Least Concern (IUCN 3.1)

Scientific classification
- Kingdom: Animalia
- Phylum: Chordata
- Class: Aves
- Order: Passeriformes
- Family: Rhipiduridae
- Genus: Rhipidura
- Species: R. melanolaema

Binomial name
- Rhipidura melanolaema Sharpe, 1879

Species of bird

The Santa Cruz fantail (Rhipidura melanolaema) is a species of bird in the family Rhipiduridae that is endemic to the Santa Cruz Islands in the Pacific Ocean. It was formerly considered to be a subspecies of the Australian rufous fantail (Rhipidura rufifrons).

== Taxonomy ==
The Santa Cruz fantail was formally described in 1879 by the English ornithologist Richard Bowdler Sharpe based on a specimen collected on Vanikoro in the Santa Cruz Islands. Sharpe placed it with the fantails in the genus Rhipidura and coined the binomial name Rhipidura melanolaema. This was a replacement name for Muscylva pectoralis Pucheran, 1853, that was preoccupied by Leucocirca pectoralis Jerdon, 1843. The specific epithet melanolaema combines the Ancient Greek melas meaning "black" with laimos meaning "throat". The Santa Cruz fantail was formerly considered to be a subspecies of the rufous fantail (renamed the Australian rufous fantail) (Rhipidura rufifrons) but is now treated as a separate species mainly based on the genetic differences.

Three subspecies are recognised:

- R. m. agilis Mayr, 1931 – Nendö Island (west Santa Cruz Islands, southeast Solomon Islands)
- R. m. melanolaema Sharpe, 1879 – Vanikoro (south Santa Cruz Islands, southeast Solomon Islands)
- R. m. utupuae Mayr, 1931 – Utupua (central Santa Cruz Islands southeast Solomon Islands)
