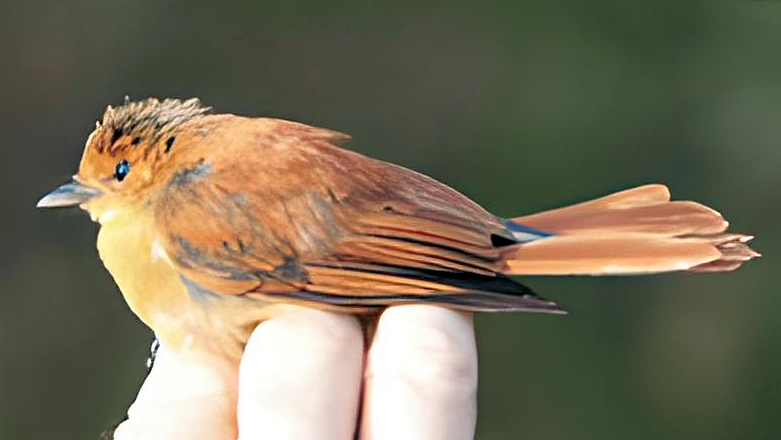

Conservation status
- Vulnerable (IUCN 3.1)

Scientific classification
- Kingdom: Animalia
- Phylum: Chordata
- Class: Aves
- Order: Passeriformes
- Family: Rhipiduridae
- Genus: Rhipidura
- Species: R. malaitae

Binomial name
- Rhipidura malaitae Mayr, 1931

= Malaita fantail =

Species of bird

The Malaita fantail (Rhipidura malaitae) is a fantail endemic to Malaita in the Solomon Islands.
