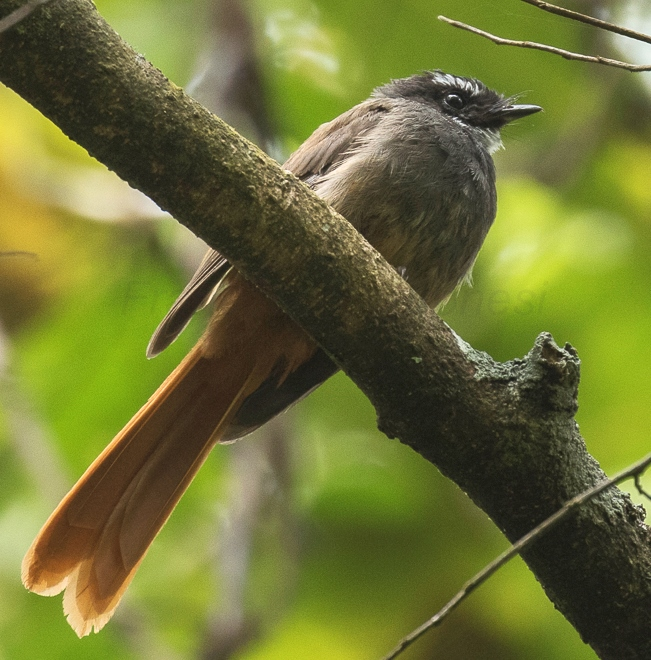

Conservation status
- Least Concern (IUCN 3.1)

Scientific classification
- Kingdom: Animalia
- Phylum: Chordata
- Class: Aves
- Order: Passeriformes
- Family: Rhipiduridae
- Genus: Rhipidura
- Species: R. phoenicura

Binomial name
- Rhipidura phoenicura Müller, 1843

= Rufous-tailed fantail =

Species of bird

The rufous-tailed fantail (Rhipidura phoenicura) is a species of bird in the family Rhipiduridae. It is endemic to Java in Indonesia. Its natural habitat is subtropical or tropical moist montane forests.
