= Bismarck fantail =

Conservation status
- Least Concern (IUCN 3.1)

Scientific classification
- Kingdom: Animalia
- Phylum: Chordata
- Class: Aves
- Order: Passeriformes
- Family: Rhipiduridae
- Genus: Rhipidura
- Species: R. dahli

Binomial name
- Rhipidura dahli Reichenow, 1897
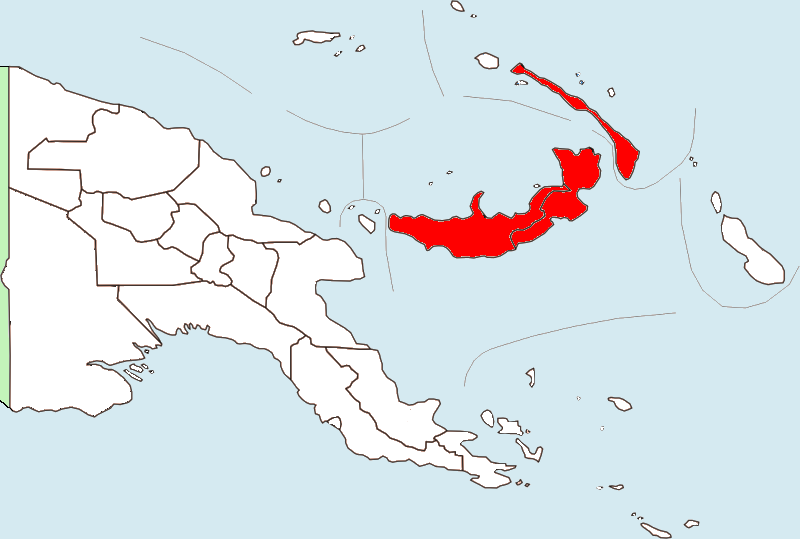

Species of bird

The Bismarck fantail (Rhipidura dahli) is a fantail native to the islands New Britain and New Ireland. The binomial commemorates the German naturalist Friedrich Dahl.

== Taxonomy ==
According to IOC there are 2 recognised subspecies. In alphabetical order, these are:

- R. d. antonii Hartert, E, 1926
- R. d. dahli Reichenow, 1897
