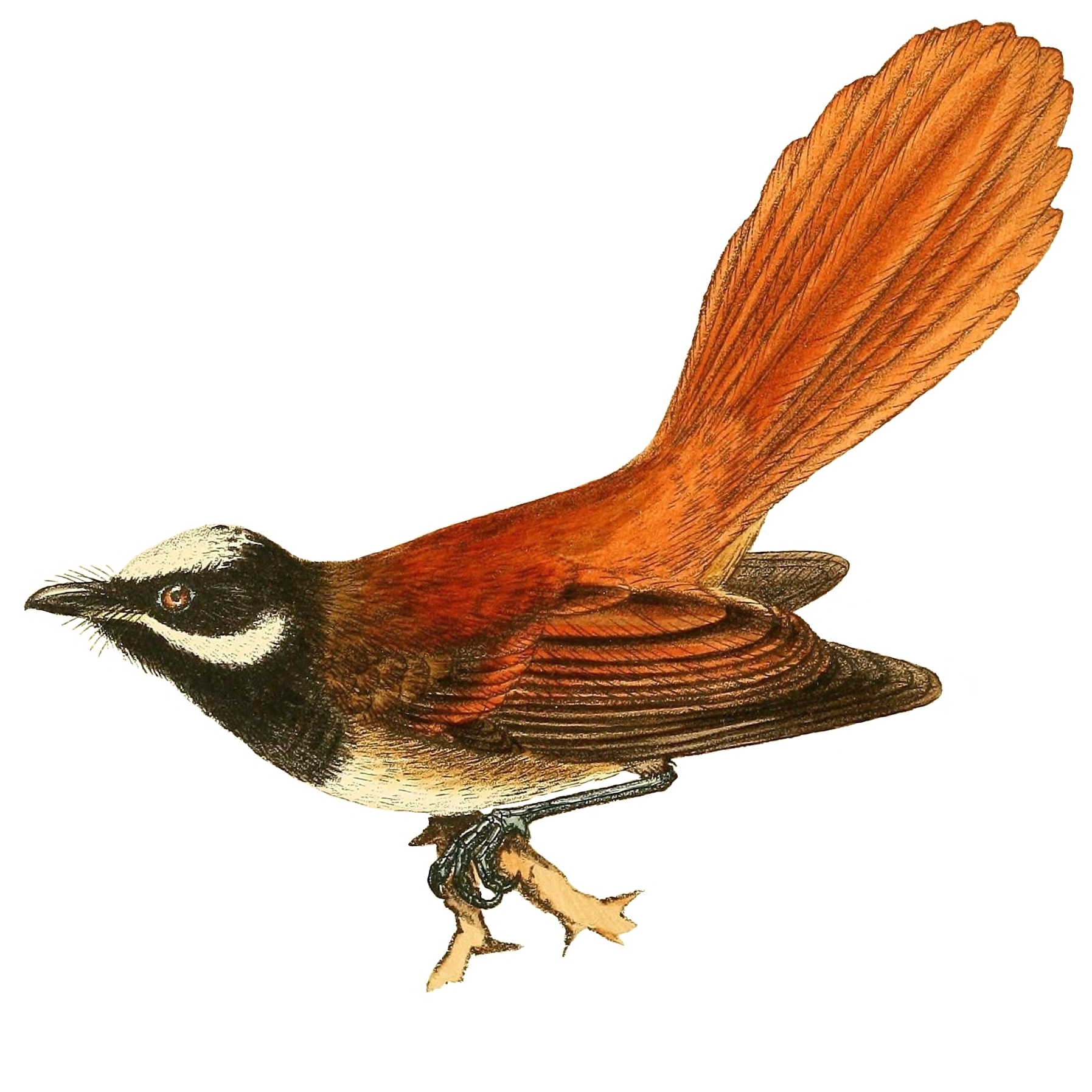

Conservation status
- Near Threatened (IUCN 3.1)

Scientific classification
- Kingdom: Animalia
- Phylum: Chordata
- Class: Aves
- Order: Passeriformes
- Family: Rhipiduridae
- Genus: Rhipidura
- Species: R. matthiae

Binomial name
- Rhipidura matthiae Heinroth, 1902

= Mussau fantail =

Species of bird

The Mussau fantail (Rhipidura matthiae) or Matthias fantail, is a fantail which is endemic to Mussau Island in the St. Matthias Islands of Papua New Guinea.
