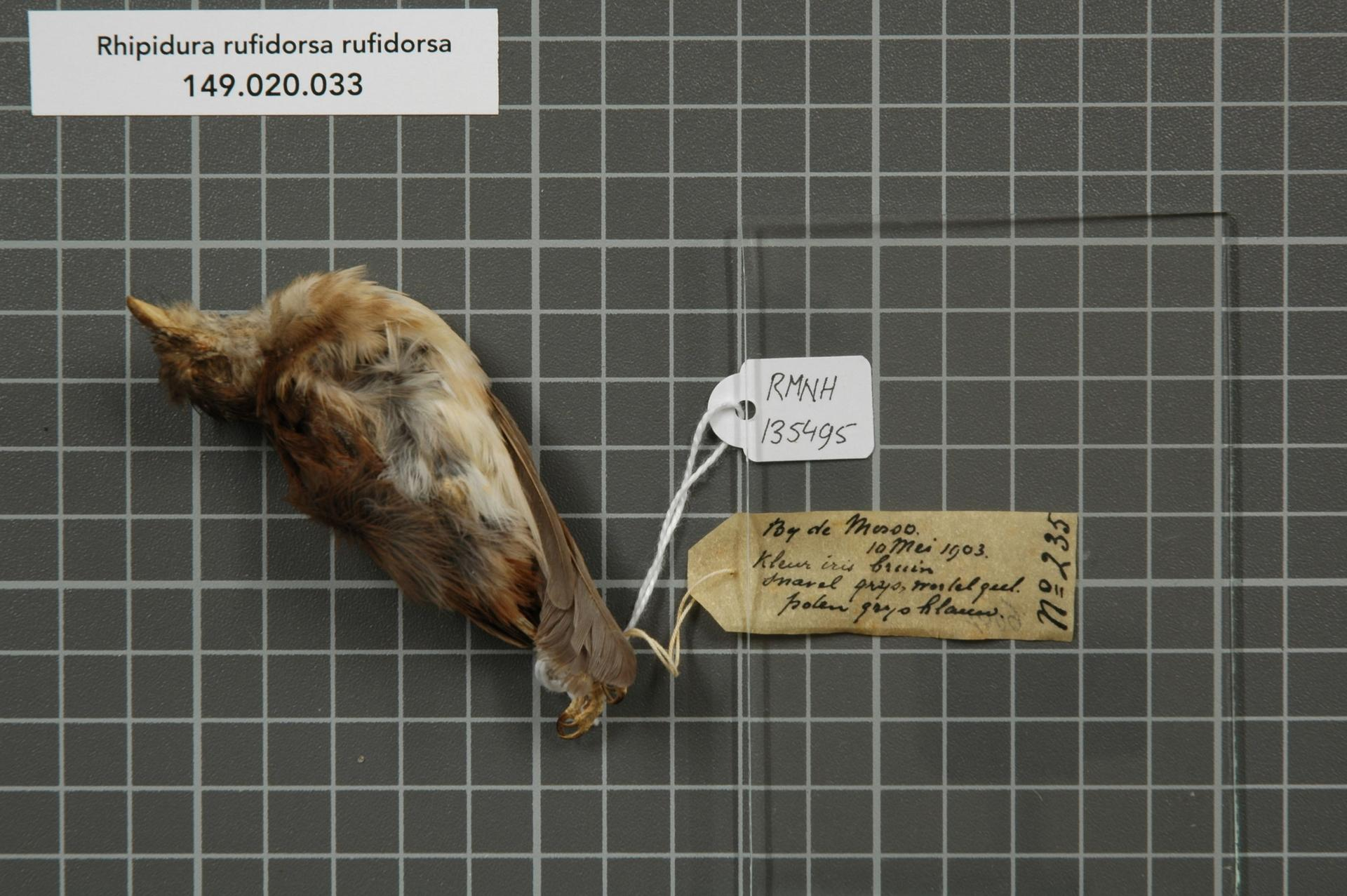

Conservation status
- Least Concern (IUCN 3.1)

Scientific classification
- Kingdom: Animalia
- Phylum: Chordata
- Class: Aves
- Order: Passeriformes
- Family: Rhipiduridae
- Genus: Rhipidura
- Species: R. rufidorsa

Binomial name
- Rhipidura rufidorsa Meyer, 1874

= Rufous-backed fantail =

Species of bird

The rufous-backed fantail (Rhipidura rufidorsa) is a species of bird in the family Rhipiduridae. It is found in New Guinea. Its natural habitat is subtropical or tropical moist lowland forests.
