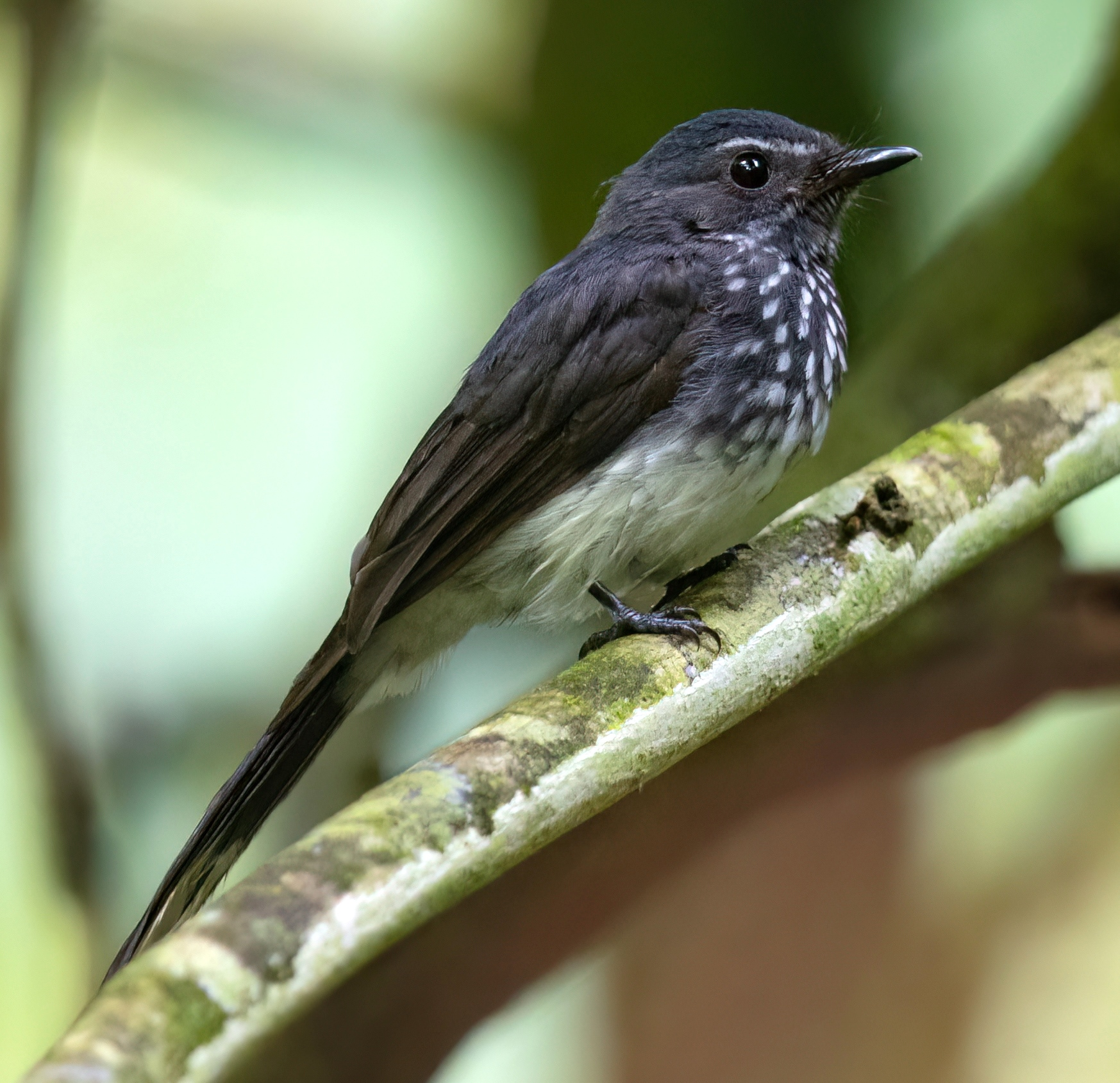

Conservation status
- Least Concern (IUCN 3.1)

Scientific classification
- Kingdom: Animalia
- Phylum: Chordata
- Class: Aves
- Order: Passeriformes
- Family: Rhipiduridae
- Genus: Rhipidura
- Species: R. perlata

Binomial name
- Rhipidura perlata Müller, 1843

= Spotted fantail =

Species of bird

The spotted fantail (Rhipidura perlata) is a species of bird in the family Rhipiduridae.

It is found throughout Sumatra, Borneo and the southern Malay Peninsula. Its natural habitat is subtropical or tropical moist lowland forests.
