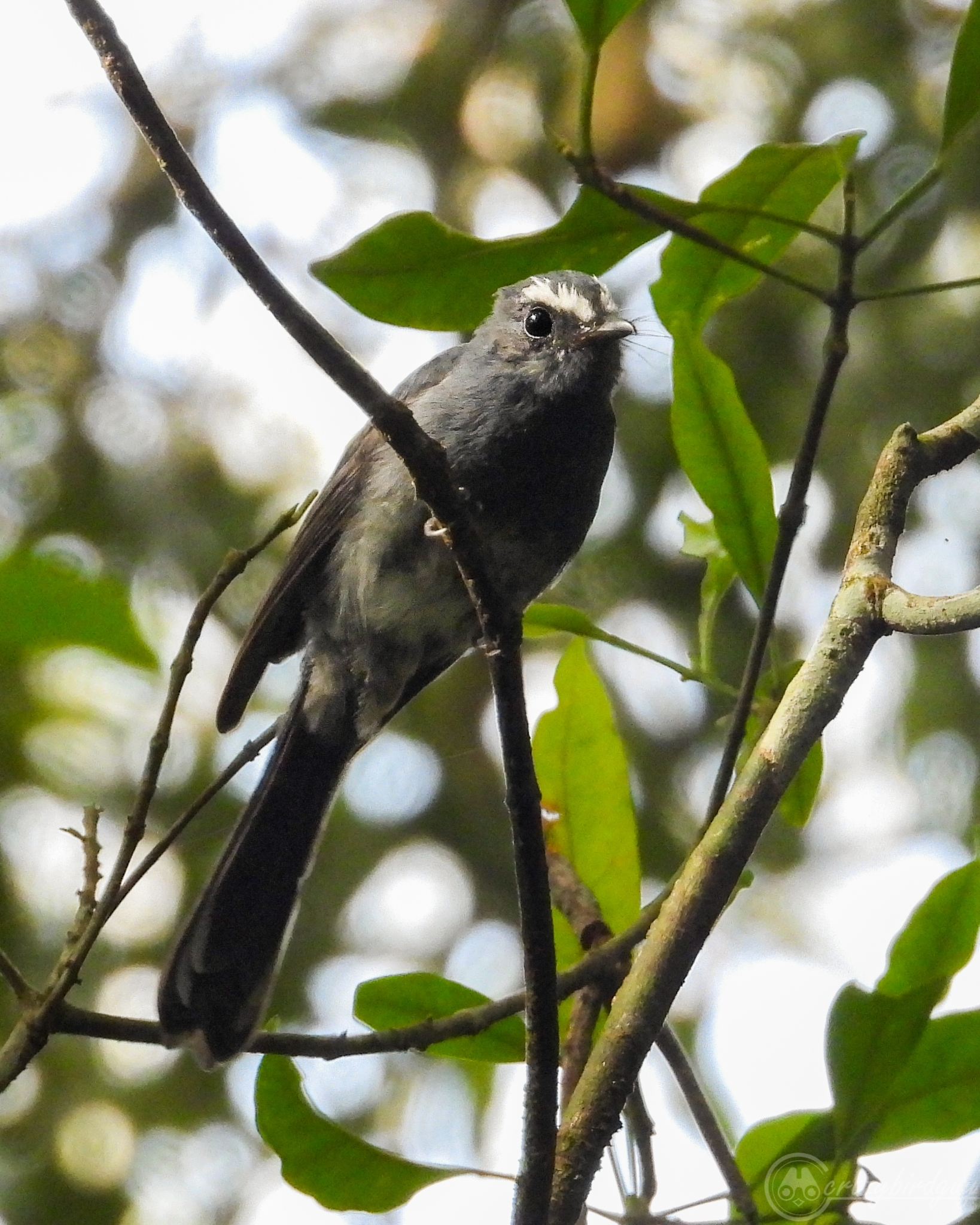

Conservation status
- Least Concern (IUCN 3.1)

Scientific classification
- Kingdom: Animalia
- Phylum: Chordata
- Class: Aves
- Order: Passeriformes
- Family: Rhipiduridae
- Genus: Rhipidura
- Species: R. euryura

Binomial name
- Rhipidura euryura Müller, 1843

= White-bellied fantail =

Species of bird

The white-bellied fantail (Rhipidura euryura) is a species of bird in the family Rhipiduridae.

It is endemic to Java. Its natural habitat is subtropical or tropical moist montane forests.
