= Manus fantail =

Conservation status
- Vulnerable (IUCN 3.1)

Scientific classification
- Kingdom: Animalia
- Phylum: Chordata
- Class: Aves
- Order: Passeriformes
- Family: Rhipiduridae
- Genus: Rhipidura
- Species: R. semirubra

Binomial name
- Rhipidura semirubra Sclater, PL, 1877

Species of bird

The Manus fantail (Rhipidura semirubra) is a bird species endemic to the Admiralty Islands of Papua New Guinea. It is a monotypic species, meaning it is the only one of its kind within its genus. Historically, the Manus fantail has been seen on Manus Island itself, but more recently it has been sighted on smaller surrounding islands like Tong, Rambutyo, and others in the San Miguel and Fedarb groups.

== Taxonomy and Systematics ==
The Manus Fantail was first formally described for Western science by the British zoologist Philip Lutley Sclater in 1877 (Sclater, 1877).

The genus name, Rhipidura, is derived from the Ancient Greek words rhipis, meaning "fan," and oura, meaning "tail." This name accurately describes the characteristic habit of birds in this genus to repeatedly fan their long tail feathers while foraging.

The Manus Fantail is classified as a monotypic species, meaning no subspecies are recognized. The species is sometimes referred to by other common names, including the Admiralty Fantail or the Black-and-rufous Fantail. The name "Manus Fantail" is standardized by major ornithological authorities.

== Description ==
The Manus Fantail is a small, agile bird, measuring approximately 14.5 centimeters in length and weighing about 8.0 grams. Both males and females are identical in plumage.

The upperparts, including the crown, nape, and back, are a bright, uniform cinnamon-red. The area between the eye and the bill is dark sooty-grey which makes their bright white cheeks stand out. The upper breast features a prominent black band, which transitions to a white lower breast and belly that is heavily marked with black spotting. It is dark brown with a rufous base and pale ashy-grey tips. The wings are a darker brown compared to the bright back.

== Habitat and Distribution ==
Earlier records show that Manus Fantail appeared on the main island of Manus. In recent decades, the species has predominantly been observed on smaller offshore islands. Key locations include the islands of Tong, Rambutyo, Pak, and Anobat in the San Miguel Islands, as well as Sivisa in the Fedarb Islands. It is often seen by observers chartering boats to these smaller islands. The species inhabits lowland primary forests but demonstrates a notable tolerance for disturbed habitats. It is frequently found in degraded secondary growth, dense scrub, and overgrown coconut plantations.

The Manus Fantail is currently listed as Least Concern. The population, estimated to number between 1,500 and 7,000 mature individuals, is believed to be stable. The bird's ability to thrive in degraded forests and secondary growth reduces its immediate vulnerability to habitat modification. However, its extremely small global range and the fragmentation of its populations across several small islands allow researchers to believe that they may be affected by severe storms, or the introduction of predators or diseases.

== Vocalization ==
The vocal repertoire of the Manus Fantail is not as complex as some of its relatives. Its song is generally described as a series of thin, high-pitched, and scratchy notes, lacking the melodious quality of some other fantail species. These calls are used for maintaining contact with mates, defending territories, and general communication within the dense forest environment where visual contact is often limited. More detailed acoustic analysis of its call structure is needed.
