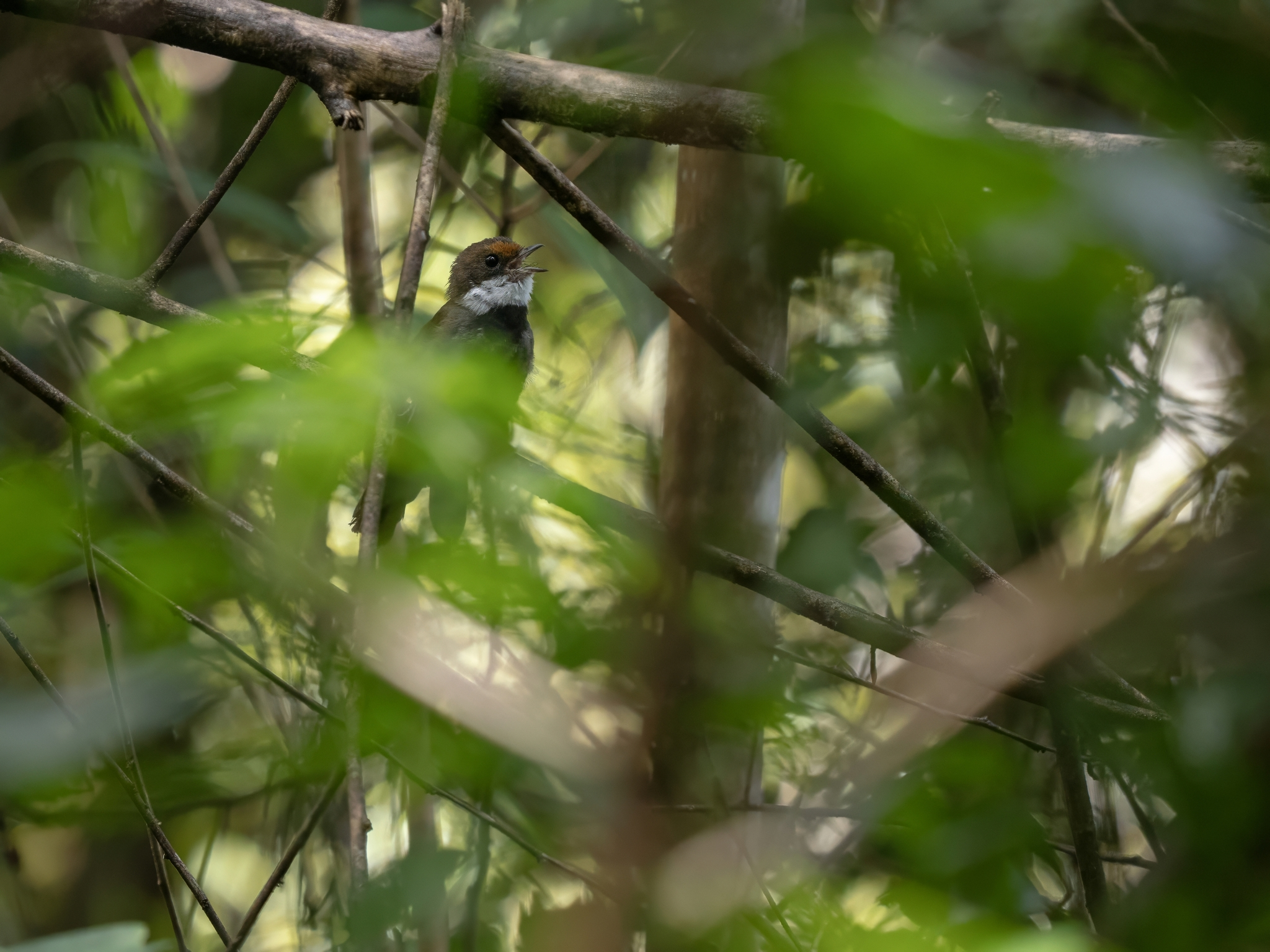

Scientific classification
- Kingdom: Animalia
- Phylum: Chordata
- Class: Aves
- Order: Passeriformes
- Family: Rhipiduridae
- Genus: Rhipidura
- Species: R. habibiei

Binomial name
- Rhipidura habibiei Rheindt et al., 2020

= Peleng fantail =

Species of bird

The Peleng fantail (Rhipidura habibiei) is a fantail endemic to the mountainous areas of Peleng island in Indonesia. It can be distinguished from other species of fantail by the black scaling below its black breast patch, bright white throat, and distinct courtship vocalization. It was described in 2020 alongside 9 other new species and subspecies of birds endemic to islands in Wallacea. All of them were discovered in surveys during 2009 and 2013, the largest discovery of its kind in over a century. It may be potentially threatened by deforestation and climate change-fueled wildfires.

== See also ==
- List of bird species described in the 2020s
