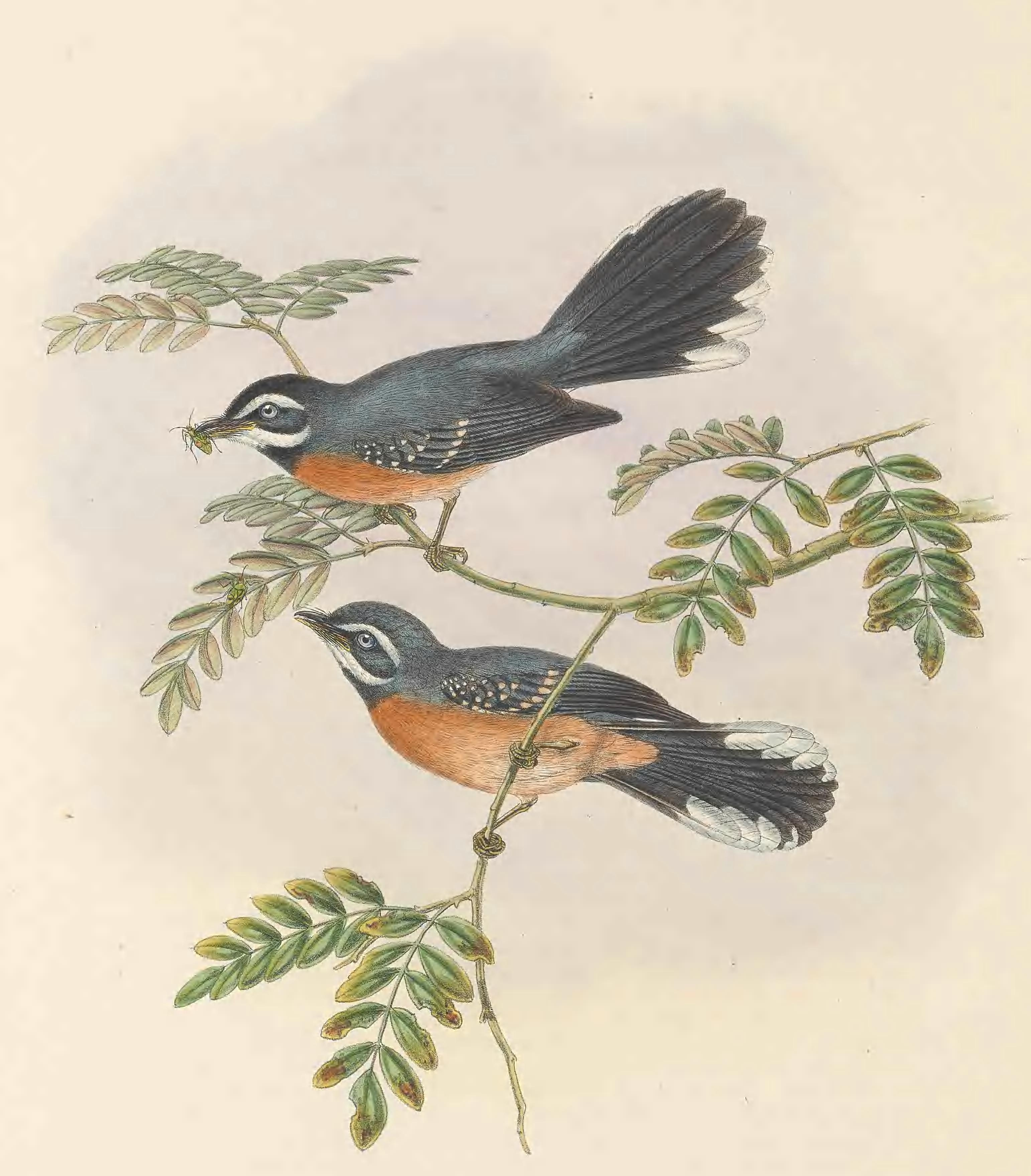

Conservation status
- Least Concern (IUCN 3.1)

Scientific classification
- Kingdom: Animalia
- Phylum: Chordata
- Class: Aves
- Order: Passeriformes
- Family: Rhipiduridae
- Genus: Rhipidura
- Species: R. hyperythra

Binomial name
- Rhipidura hyperythra GR Gray, 1858

= Chestnut-bellied fantail =

Species of bird

The chestnut-bellied fantail (Rhipidura hyperythra) is a species of bird in the family Rhipiduridae. It is found in the Aru Islands and New Guinea. Its natural habitats are subtropical or tropical moist lowland forests and subtropical or tropical moist montane forests

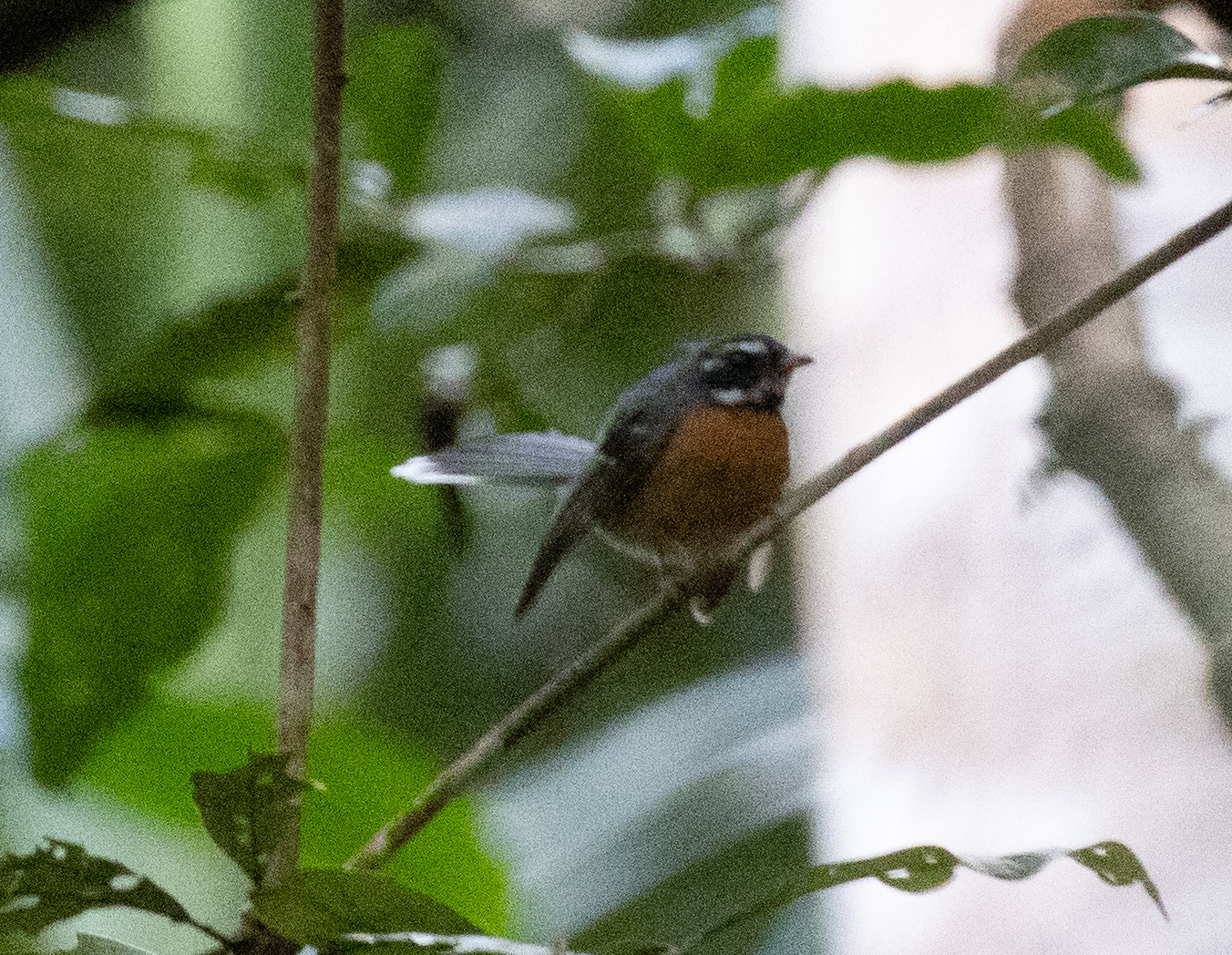
In Varirata National Park, outskirts of Port Moresby

.
