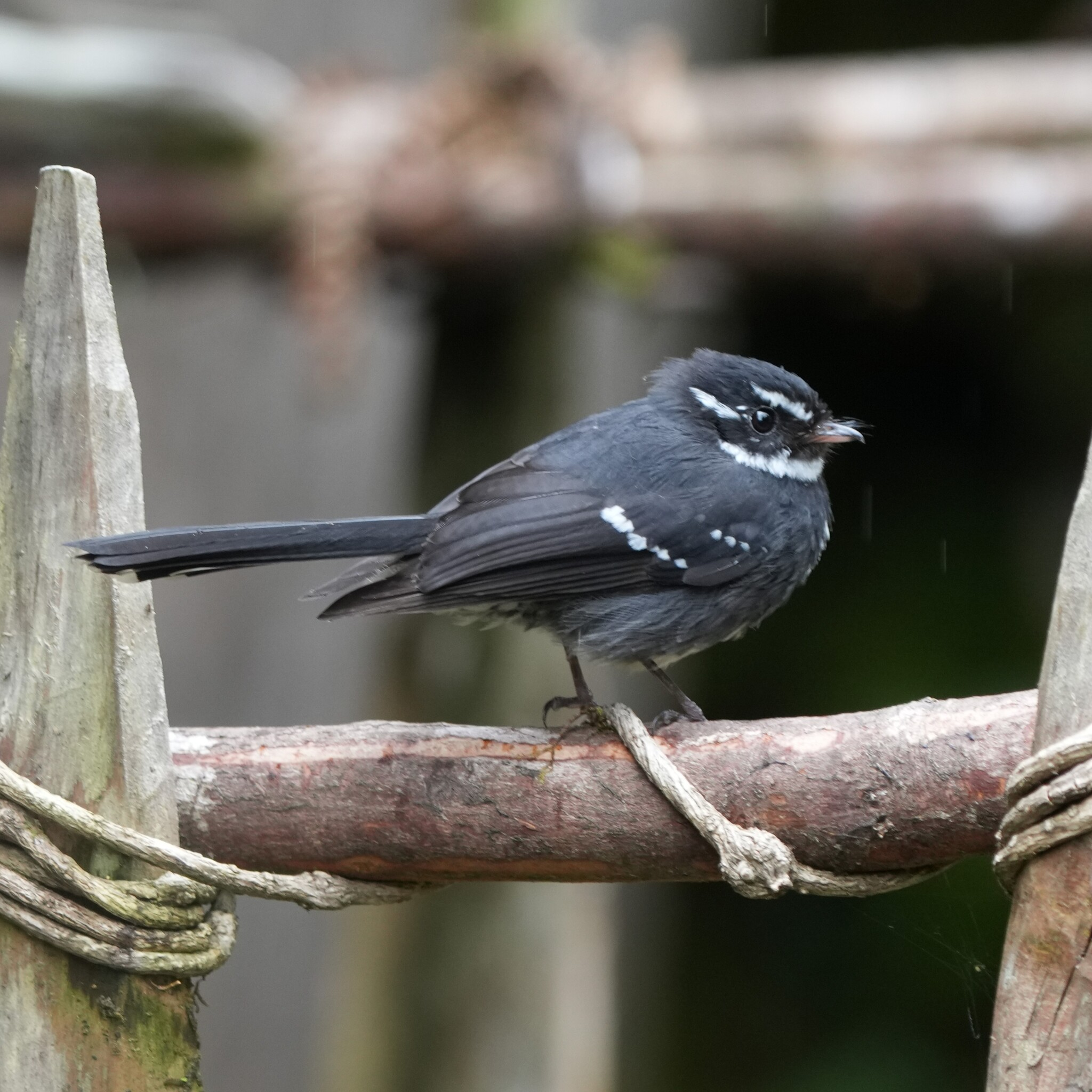

Conservation status
- Least Concern (IUCN 3.1)

Scientific classification
- Kingdom: Animalia
- Phylum: Chordata
- Class: Aves
- Order: Passeriformes
- Family: Rhipiduridae
- Genus: Rhipidura
- Species: R. albolimbata

Binomial name
- Rhipidura albolimbata Salvadori, 1874

= Friendly fantail =

Species of bird

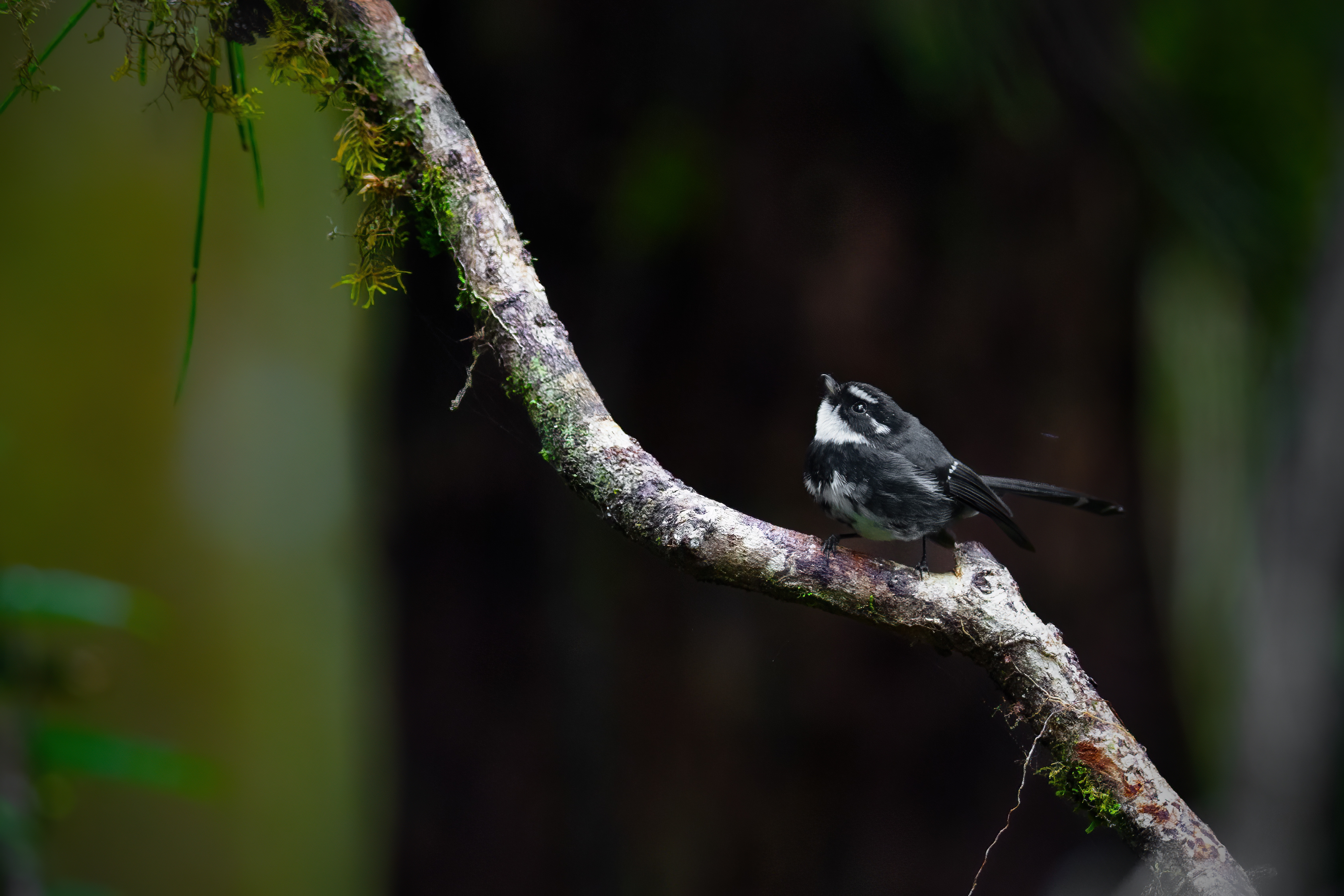
Friendly Fantail

The friendly fantail (Rhipidura albolimbata) is a species of bird in the family Rhipiduridae. It is found in the highlands of New Guinea. Its natural habitat is subtropical or tropical moist montane forests.
