= Louisiade fantail =

Scientific classification
- Kingdom: Animalia
- Phylum: Chordata
- Class: Aves
- Order: Passeriformes
- Family: Rhipiduridae
- Genus: Rhipidura
- Species: R. louisiadensis

Binomial name
- Rhipidura louisiadensis Hartert, 1899

Species of bird

The Louisiade fantail (Rhipidura louisiadensis) is a species of bird in the family Rhipiduridae that is endemic to the D'Entrecasteaux Islands and the Louisiade Archipelago to the east of New Guinea. This species was formerly considered to be a subspecies of the Australian rufous fantail (Rhipidura rufifrons).

== Taxonomy ==
The Louisiade fantail was formally described in 1899 by the German ornithologist Ernst Hartert based on specimens collected by Albert Stewart Meek on Rossel Island within the Louisiade Archipelago to the southeast of New Guinea. Hartert placed it with the fantails in the genus Rhipidura and coined the binomial name Rhipidura louisiadensis. The Louisiade fantail was formerly considered to be a subspecies of the rufous fantail (renamed the Australian rufous fantail) (Rhipidura rufifrons) but is now treated as a separate species mainly based on the genetic differences. The species is monotypic: no subspecies are recognised.
