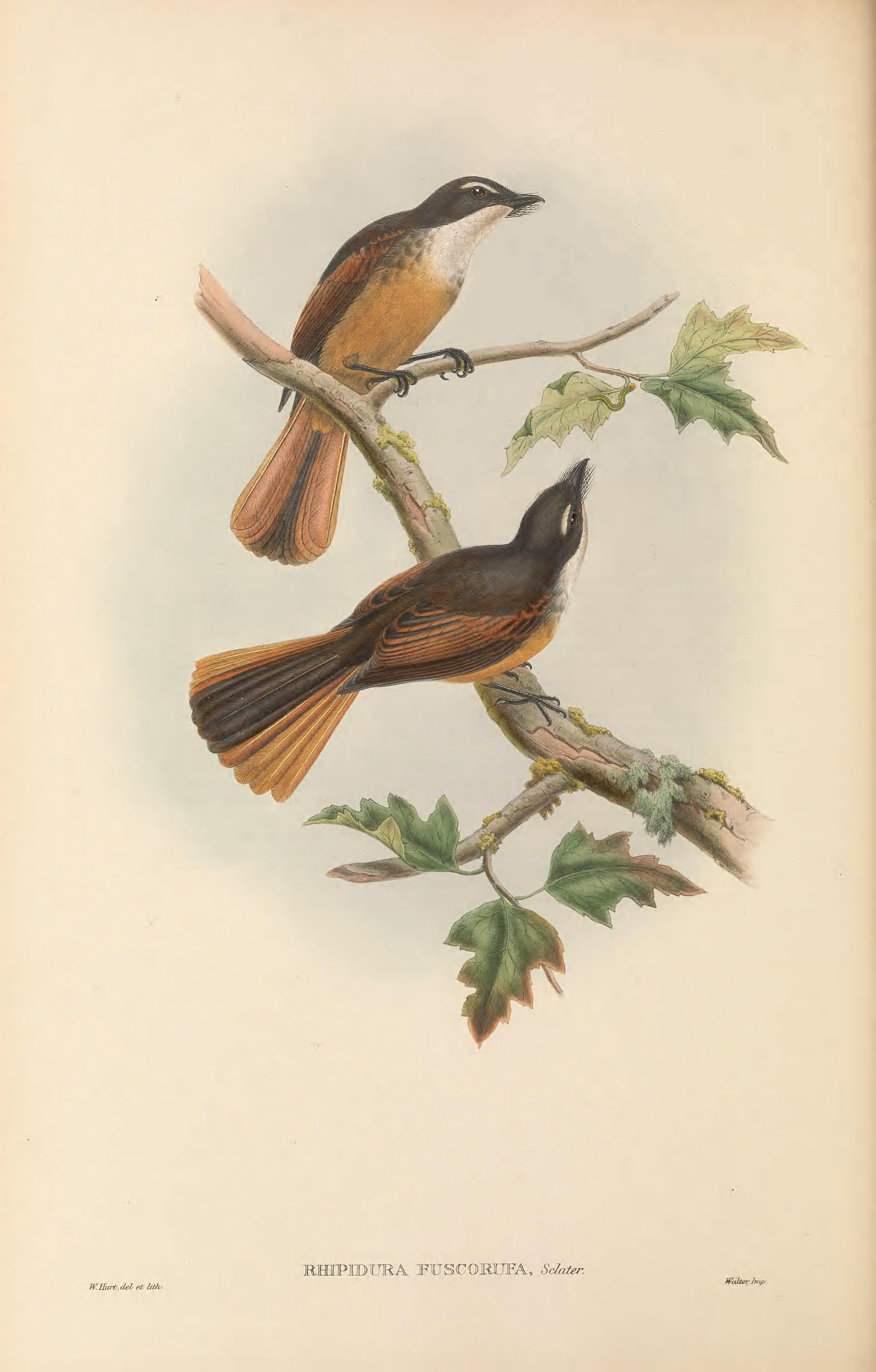

Conservation status
- Near Threatened (IUCN 3.1)

Scientific classification
- Kingdom: Animalia
- Phylum: Chordata
- Class: Aves
- Order: Passeriformes
- Family: Rhipiduridae
- Genus: Rhipidura
- Species: R. fuscorufa

Binomial name
- Rhipidura fuscorufa Sclater, PL, 1883

= Tremolo fantail =

Species of bird

The tremolo fantail or cinnamon-tailed fantail (Rhipidura fuscorufa) is a fantail restricted to the Banda Sea Islands of Indonesia.
