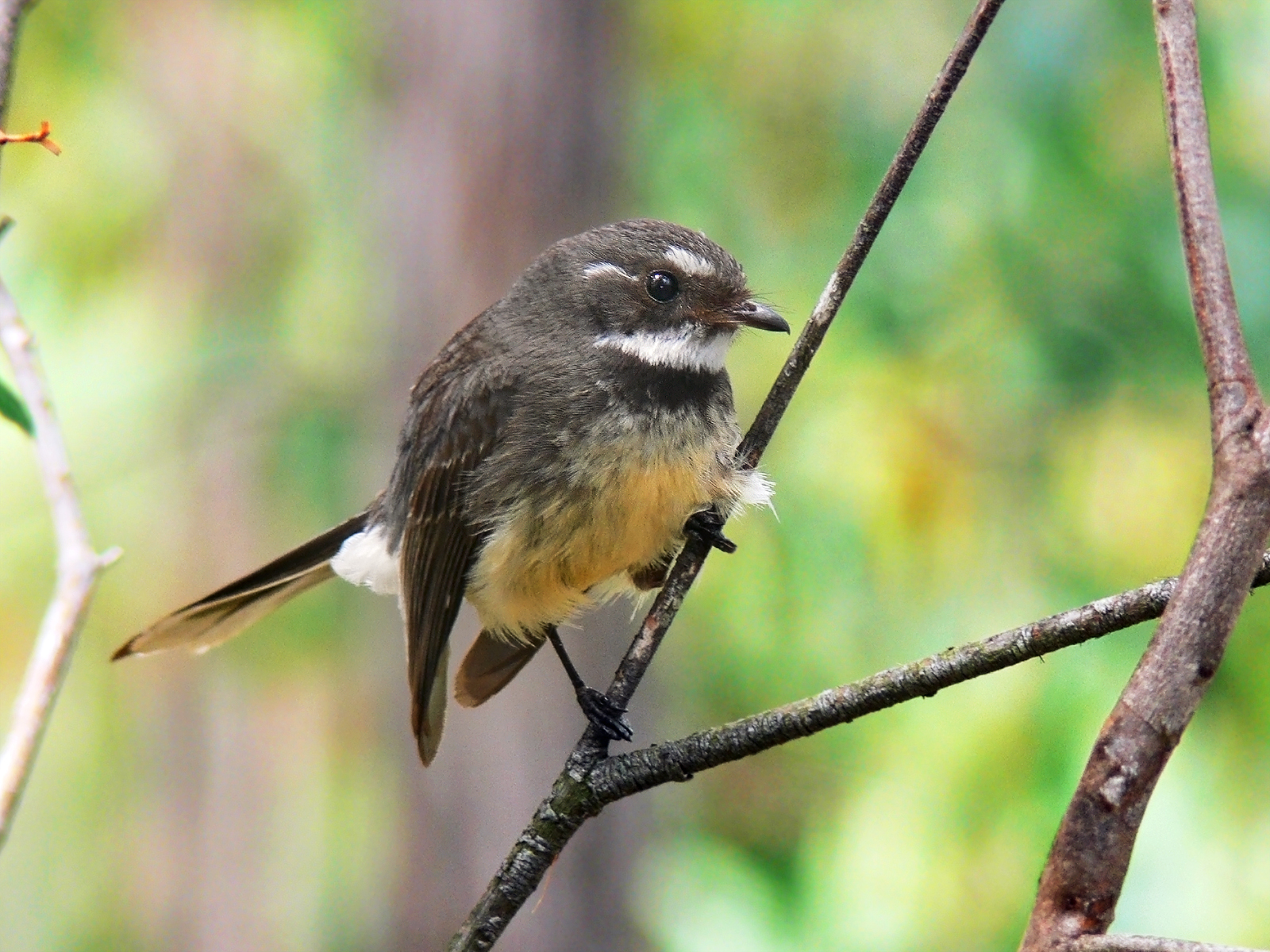
- Grey fantail (Rhipidura albiscapa)

Scientific classification
- Kingdom: Animalia
- Phylum: Chordata
- Class: Aves
- Order: Passeriformes
- Family: Rhipiduridae
- Subfamily: Rhipidurinae
- Genus: Rhipidura; Vigors & Horsfield, 1827

Type species
- Muscicapa flabellifera Gmelin, JF, 1788

Species
- Over 50, see text

= Fantail =

Fantails

Genus of birds

Fantails are small insectivorous songbirds of the genus Rhipidura in the family Rhipiduridae, native to Australasia, Southeast Asia and the Indian subcontinent. Most of the species are about 15 to 18 cm (5.9 to 7.1 in) long, specialist aerial feeders, and named as "fantails", but the Australian willie wagtail is a little larger, and, though still an expert hunter of insects on the wing, concentrates equally on terrestrial prey.

The true wagtails are part of the genus Motacilla in the family Motacillidae and are not close relatives of the fantails.

== Taxonomy ==
The genus Rhipidura was introduced in 1827 by the naturalists Nicholas Vigors and Thomas Horsfield. The type species was subsequently designated as Muscicapa flabellifera Gmelin, JF, 1788 by the English zoologist George Gray in 1840. This is a junior synonym of Muscicapa fuliginosa Sparrman, 1787, the New Zealand fantail. The genus name combines the Ancient Greek rhipis, rhipidos meaning "fan" with "oura" meaning "tail".

== Description ==
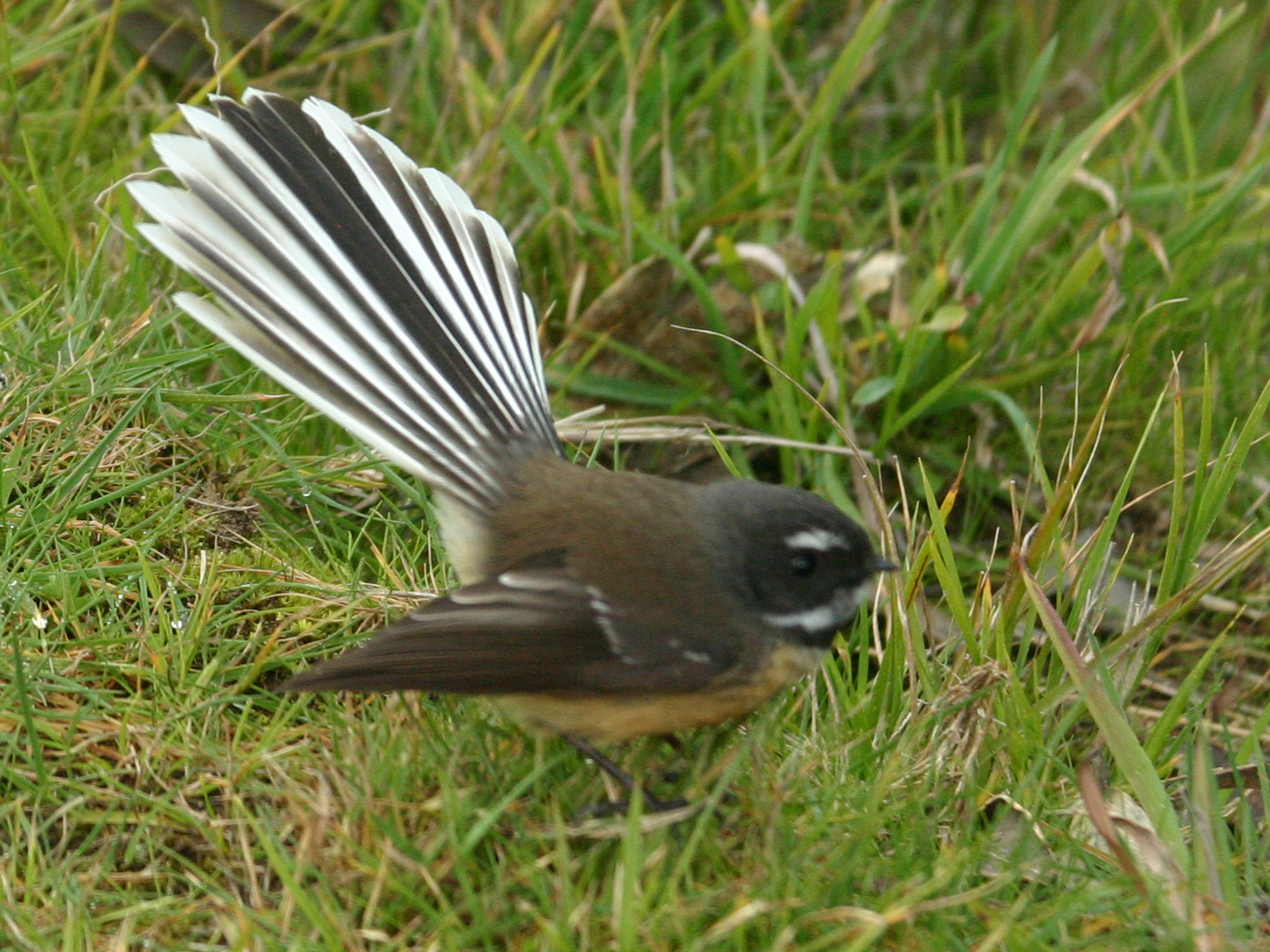
A display of the tail that gives the family its name

The fantails are small bodied (11.5–21 cm long) birds with long tails; in some species the tail is longer than the body and in most the tail is longer than the wing. When the tail is folded it is rounded at the end, but when spread in display or aerial foraging it has a characteristic fan shape that gives the family its name.

Fantails adopt a hunched horizontal posture most of the time, with the wings drooped and held away from the body and the tail half cocked. There are some exceptions to this, particularly the northern fantail of New Guinea and the Cockerell's fantail of the Solomon Islands, which have a more upright posture reminiscent of the monarch flycatchers.

The wings of fantails are tapered and have sacrificed speed for agility, making fantails highly efficient at catching insect prey. Overall the fantails are strong fliers, and some species can undertake long migrations, but the thicket fantails (sooty thicket fantail, white-bellied thicket fantail and black thicket fantail) are very weak fliers, and need to alight regularly.

The bills of fantails are typical for aerial insect eating birds, being flat and triangular. The gape is surrounded by two rows of rictal bristles which are long, often as long as the bill. The bills of most species are fairly weak, limiting fantails to softer insects, although the more terrestrial willie wagtail has a stronger bill.

The plumage of most fantails shows some variation, most species are relatively uniform with some markings. A few species, such as the Rennell fantail, have uniform plumage, while others have striking if sombre patterns. The colours of most species are greys, blacks, whites and browns, although a few species have yellow or even striking blue feathers. In most species there is no sexual dimorphism in plumage; the notable exception being the black fantail of New Guinea where the male has all-over black plumage and the female is almost entirely rufous. In a few species, such as the New Zealand fantail, there exist two colour morphs, the common pied morph and the rarer black morph (which is most common in the South Island).

== Distribution and habitat ==
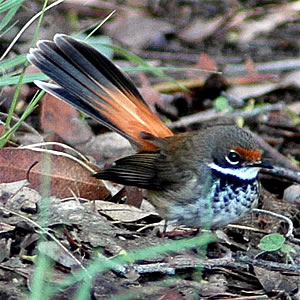
The population of rufous fantails from southeastern Australia undertakes an annual migration to northern Queensland and New Guinea

Fantails are an Australasian family that has spread from as far as Samoa to northern India. In the south the New Zealand fantail ranges as far as The Snares off New Zealand, in the eastern extent of the family has several endemic forms in western Polynesia. There are numerous species in Indonesia, the Philippines and in South East Asia, and the family ranges into southern China, India and the Himalayas. Some species have a widespread distribution, particularly the willie wagtail, grey fantail, white-throated fantail and northern fantail; others have a highly restricted range and in the case of some insular species may be restricted to a single island. The Mussau fantail is restricted to a single island in the Bismarck Archipelago, and the Kadavu fantail has a similarly restricted distribution in the Kadavu Group of Fiji.

Most fantails, particularly the tropical or insular forms, are sedentary and undertake no migration. Some northern and southern species undertake a variety of movements; the yellow-bellied fantail of the Himalayas is an altitudinal migrant, breeding between 1500 and 4000 metres, but moving to lower altitudes (as low as 180 m) in the winter. Some Australian fantails undertake seasonal migrations, although these show considerable variation even within individual species. Most populations of the rufous fantail exhibit little migratory behaviour, but the south-eastern population moves en masse to northern Queensland and New Guinea.

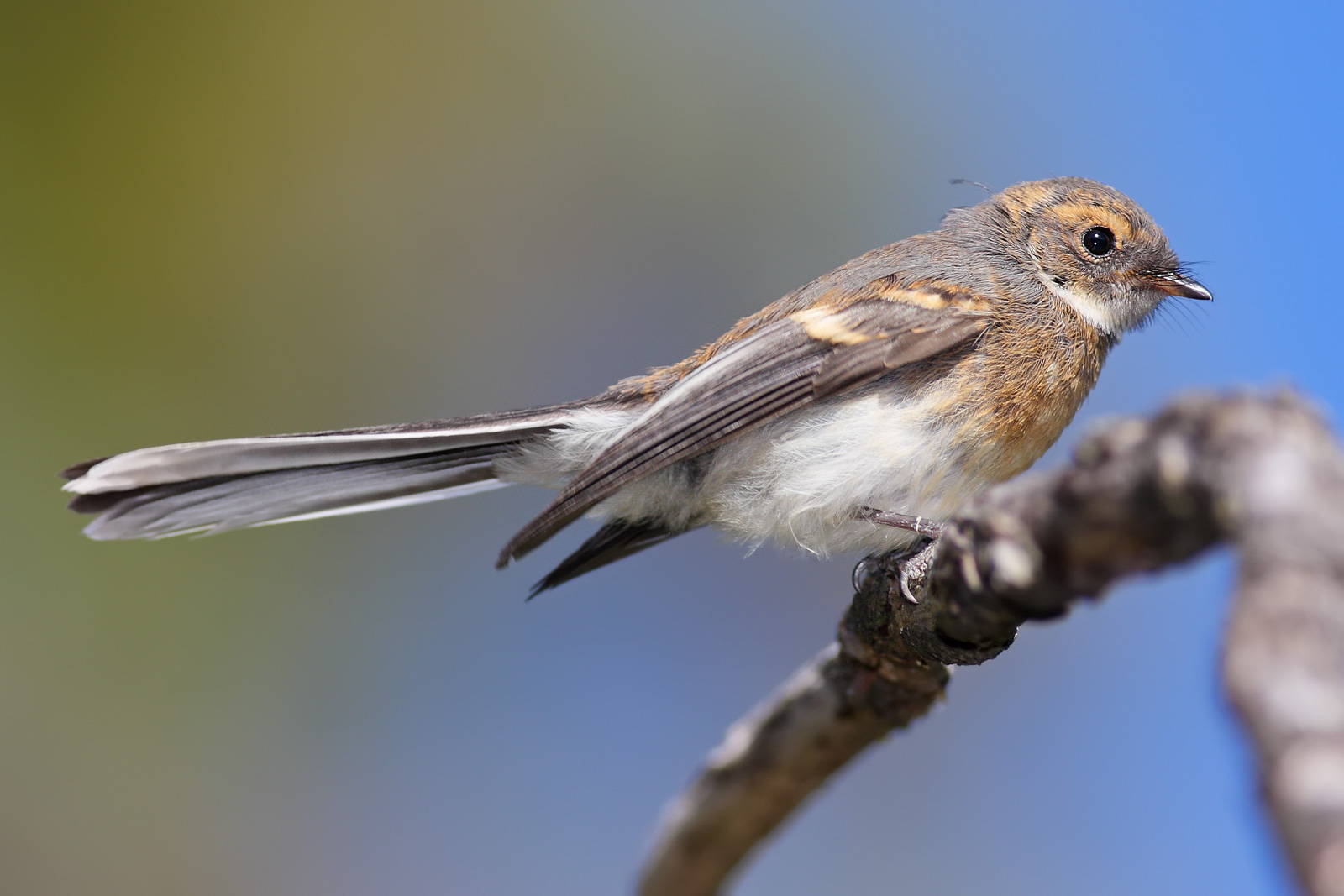
Juvenile grey fantail

Fantails exhibit wide tastes in habitat; while the majority of species are found in rainforests fantails exist in most available habitats from deserts and mangrove forests to highly modified agricultural and urban environments. Most species are able to survive in a variety of habitats. Of all the species the mangrove fantail has the most restricted habitat requirements, being entirely restricted to mangrove forests over some of its range, although it can exist 3 km away in the absence of other fantails. Some of the more primitive species are generally more restricted to primary rainforest, but most other species can survive in more disturbed forest. The most adaptable species is the willie wagtail, which is abundant in every habitat type in Australia except for dense rainforest.

== Behaviour and ecology ==
The behaviour of many species of fantail has not been studied, but overall the family is highly uniform in its habits. Anecdotal observations of less studied species suggest a high degree of similarity with the better studied species. Fantails are highly active birds, with several of the smaller species continuously on the move; even when perched they continue to rock back and forth, spin 180° on the spot, wag their tail from side to side or fan it. In flight they are highly agile and undertake highly aerobatic and intricate looping flights while using their fanned tail to catch insects in flight.

=== Diet and foraging ===
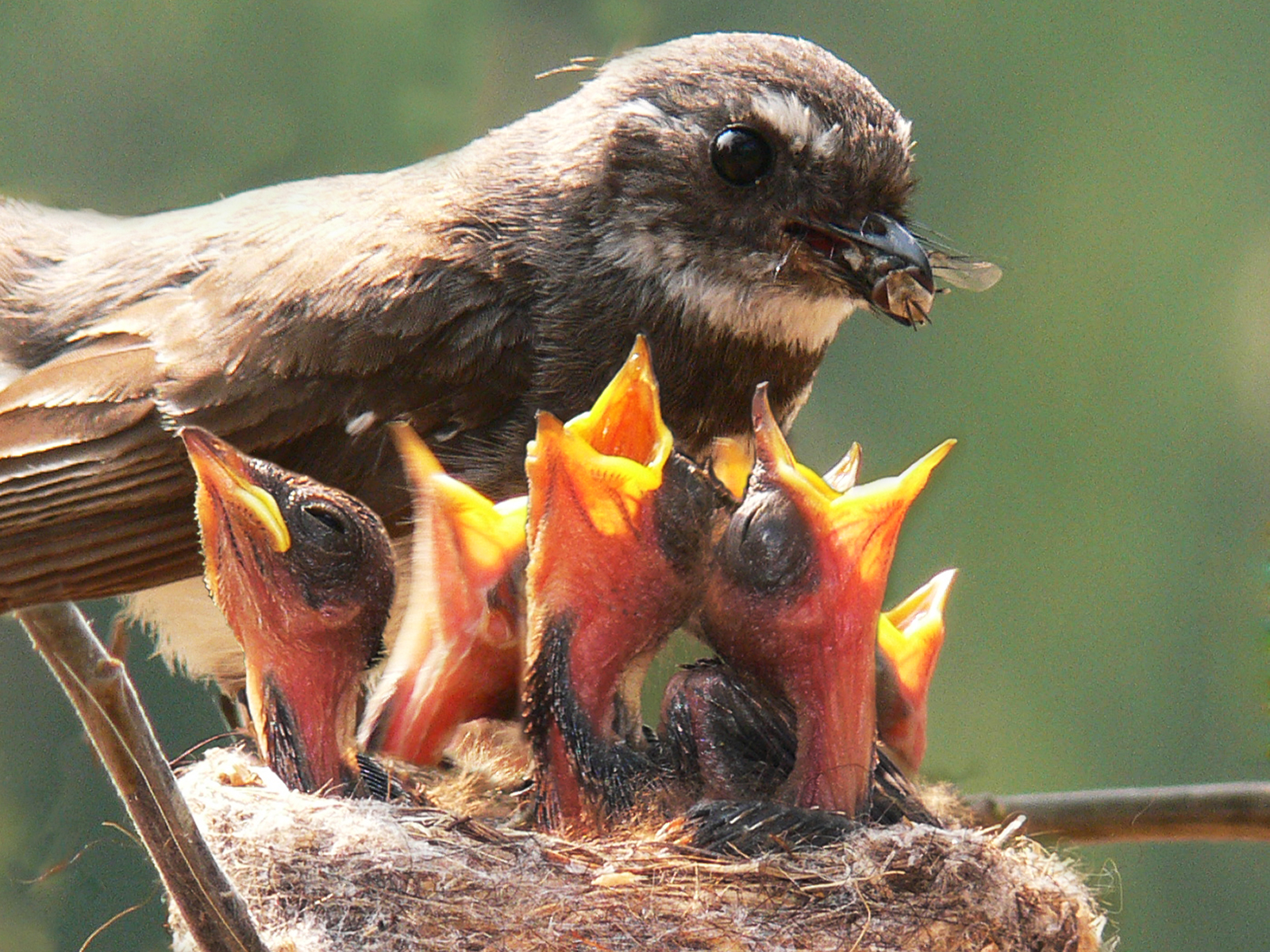
A grey fantail in Australia feeding its brood insect prey.

The majority of the diet of fantails composes of small insects and invertebrates. The larger willie wagtail is capable of tackling small skinks, but this is exceptional. Insect prey is generally small and easily handled, but larger items sometimes need to be subdued by being banged on branches, an action that also removes the wings of larger prey items like moths.

There are two general techniques used by the family in order to obtain prey. The first is known as "static searching", where the fantail will remain at a perch and watch for aerial prey which it will then sally towards and snatch from the air before returning to the perch in order to consume and resume searching. The second method used is known as "progressive searching", where the fantail moves through vegetation searching for insect prey which it gleans; the movement of the searching fantail also flushes out hidden prey which is also pursued and consumed. The willie wagtail performs a terrestrial version of this technique, pumping its tail from side to side and undertaking quick darting movements across open ground in order to flush out prey.

Fantails frequently form associations with other species in order obtain prey. Some species perch on the backs of cattle, which they use both as a vantage point and because the cattle flush up insects. This behaviour has given the willie wagtail the nickname "shepherd's companion". Fantails are often very bold around people and will approach them closely in order to capture insects flushed by them. Different species are also frequently found in mixed-species feeding flocks, travelling with other small insectivorous birds on the periphery of the flocks taking advantage of flushed prey.

=== Breeding ===
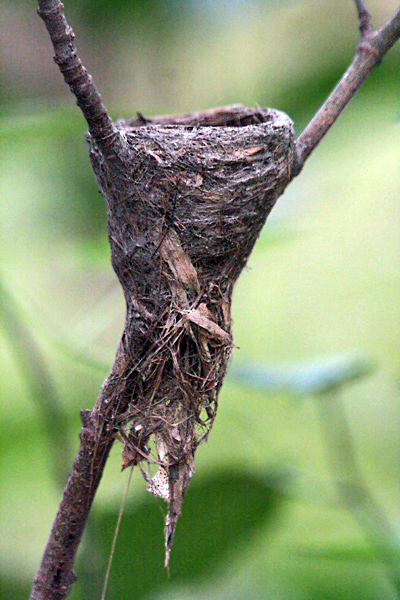
The nest of a white-throated fantail, showing the tapered tail that many nests of the family have.

Fantails are territorial and aggressively defend their territories from conspecifics (other members of the same species) as well as other fantail species and other flycatchers. Within the territory the female selects the nesting site, these sites are often close to the previous year's nest. Breeding responsibilities, nest building, incubation and chick feeding, are shared between both sexes.

The nest, a small cup of grass stems neatly bound together in spider silk, takes around 10 days to construct. Many species incorporate a trailing tail into the base of the nest; this possibly breaks up the shape of the nest, although little other effort is made to conceal the nest. To compensate for the high visibility of the nest fantails will aggressively defend their chicks from potential predators.

Female fantails will also distract a potential predator by appearing to be injured and luring the predator away from the nest. While the female is pretending to be injured the male may continue to attack the predator. In spite of this fantails have a generally low nesting success.

== Species ==
The genus contains 61 species:

Image	Common name	Scientific name
	Mindanao blue fantail	Rhipidura superciliaris
	Visayan blue fantail	Rhipidura samarensis
	Blue-headed fantail	Rhipidura cyaniceps
	Tablas fantail	Rhipidura sauli
	Visayan fantail	Rhipidura albiventris
	White-throated fantail	Rhipidura albicollis
	White-spotted fantail	Rhipidura albogularis – split from Rhipidura albicollis
	White-bellied fantail	Rhipidura euryura
	White-browed fantail	Rhipidura aureola
	Sunda pied fantail	Rhipidura javanica
	Philippine pied fantail	Rhipidura nigritorquis
	Spotted fantail	Rhipidura perlata
	Willie wagtail	Rhipidura leucophrys
	Brown-capped fantail	Rhipidura diluta
	Tremolo fantail or Cinnamon-tailed fantail	Rhipidura fuscorufa
	Cheerful fantail	Rhipidura laguceria
	Northern fantail	Rhipidura rufiventris
	White-winged fantail	Rhipidura cockerelli
	White-gorgeted fantail	Rhipidura coultasi – split from Rhipidura cockerelli
	Sooty thicket fantail	Rhipidura threnothorax
	Black thicket fantail	Rhipidura maculipectus
	White-bellied thicket fantail	Rhipidura leucothorax
	Black fantail	Rhipidura atra
	Chestnut-bellied fantail	Rhipidura hyperythra
	Friendly fantail	Rhipidura albolimbata
	Grey fantail	Rhipidura albiscapa
	New Zealand fantail	Rhipidura fuliginosa
	Mangrove fantail	Rhipidura phasiana
	Bougainville fantail	Rhipidura drownei
	Guadalcanal fantail	Rhipidura ocularis – split from Rhipidura drownei
	Makira fantail	Rhipidura tenebrosa
	Rennell fantail	Rhipidura rennelliana
	New Caledonian streaked fantail	Rhipidura verreauxi
	Vanuatu streaked fantail	Rhipidura spilodera – split from Rhipidura verreauxi
	Fiji streaked fantail	Rhipidura layardi – split from Rhipidura verreauxi
	Kadavu fantail	Rhipidura personata
	Samoan fantail	Rhipidura nebulosa
	Rufous-tailed fantail	Rhipidura phoenicura
	Black-and-cinnamon fantail	Rhipidura nigrocinnamomea
	Dimorphic fantail	Rhipidura brachyrhyncha
	Palau fantail	Rhipidura lepida
	Streak-breasted fantail	Rhipidura dedemi
	Tawny-backed fantail	Rhipidura superflua
	Sulawesi fantail	Rhipidura teysmanni
	Peleng fantail	Rhipidura habibiei
	Taliabu fantail	Rhipidura sulaensis
	Long-tailed fantail	Rhipidura opistherythra
	Rufous-backed fantail	Rhipidura rufidorsa
	Bismarck fantail	Rhipidura dahli
	Mussau fantail	Rhipidura matthiae
	Malaita fantail	Rhipidura malaitae
	Manus fantail	Rhipidura semirubra
	Arafura fantail	Rhipidura dryas
	Supertramp fantail	Rhipidura semicollaris – split from Rhipidura dryas
	Gilolo fantail	Rhipidura torrida – split from Rhipidura rufifrons
	Australian rufous fantail	Rhipidura rufifrons
	Pohnpei fantail	Rhipidura kubaryi
	Louisiade fantail	Rhipidura louisiadensis – split from Rhipidura rufifrons
	Santa Cruz fantail	Rhipidura melanolaema – split from Rhipidura rufifrons
	Micronesian rufous fantail	Rhipidura versicolor – split from Rhipidura rufifrons
	Solomons rufous fantail	Rhipidura rufofronta – split from Rhipidura rufifrons

=== Former species ===
Formerly, some authorities also considered the following species (or subspecies) as species within the genus Rhipidura:

- Slaty monarch (as Rhipidura Lessoni)
- Yellow-bellied fantail (as Rhipidura hypoxantha) – recognized in 2009 as a fairy-flycatcher of family Stenostiridae and has been moved to its old genus Chelidorhynx.
- Black monarch (as Rhipidura fallax)
