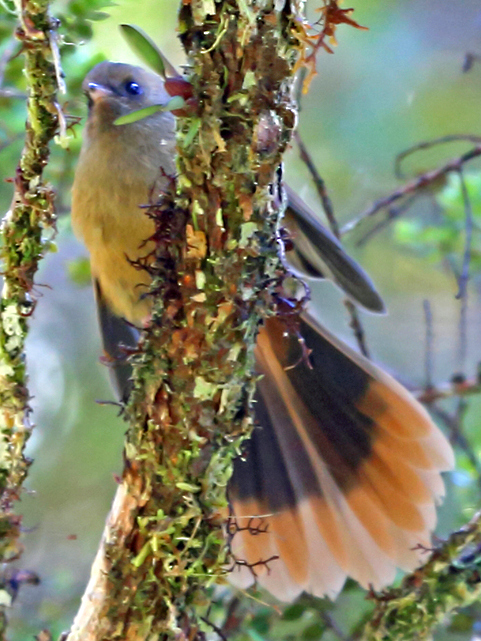

Conservation status
- Least Concern (IUCN 3.1)

Scientific classification
- Kingdom: Animalia
- Phylum: Chordata
- Class: Aves
- Order: Passeriformes
- Family: Rhipiduridae
- Genus: Rhipidura
- Species: R. brachyrhyncha

Binomial name
- Rhipidura brachyrhyncha Schlegel, 1871

= Dimorphic fantail =

Species of bird

The dimorphic fantail (Rhipidura brachyrhyncha) is a species of bird in the family Rhipiduridae. It is found in the New Guinea Highlands. Its natural habitat is subtropical or tropical moist montane forests.
