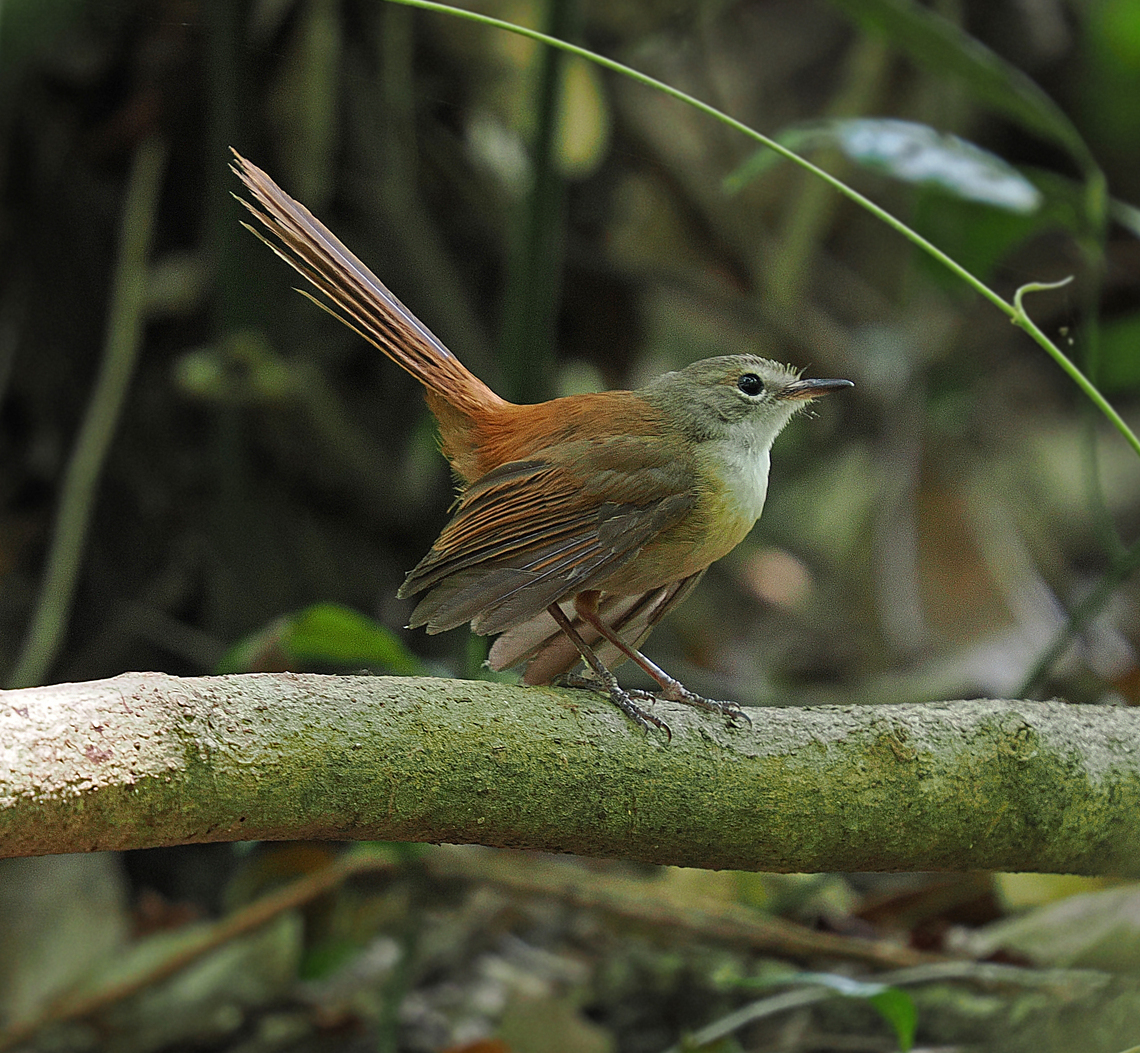

Conservation status
- Near Threatened (IUCN 3.1)

Scientific classification
- Kingdom: Animalia
- Phylum: Chordata
- Class: Aves
- Order: Passeriformes
- Family: Rhipiduridae
- Genus: Rhipidura
- Species: R. opistherythra

Binomial name
- Rhipidura opistherythra Sclater, PL, 1883

= Long-tailed fantail =

Species of bird

The long-tailed fantail (Rhipidura opistherythra) is a species of bird in the family Rhipiduridae. It is endemic to the Tanimbar Islands, where its natural habitat is subtropical or tropical moist lowland forests. It is threatened by habitat loss.
