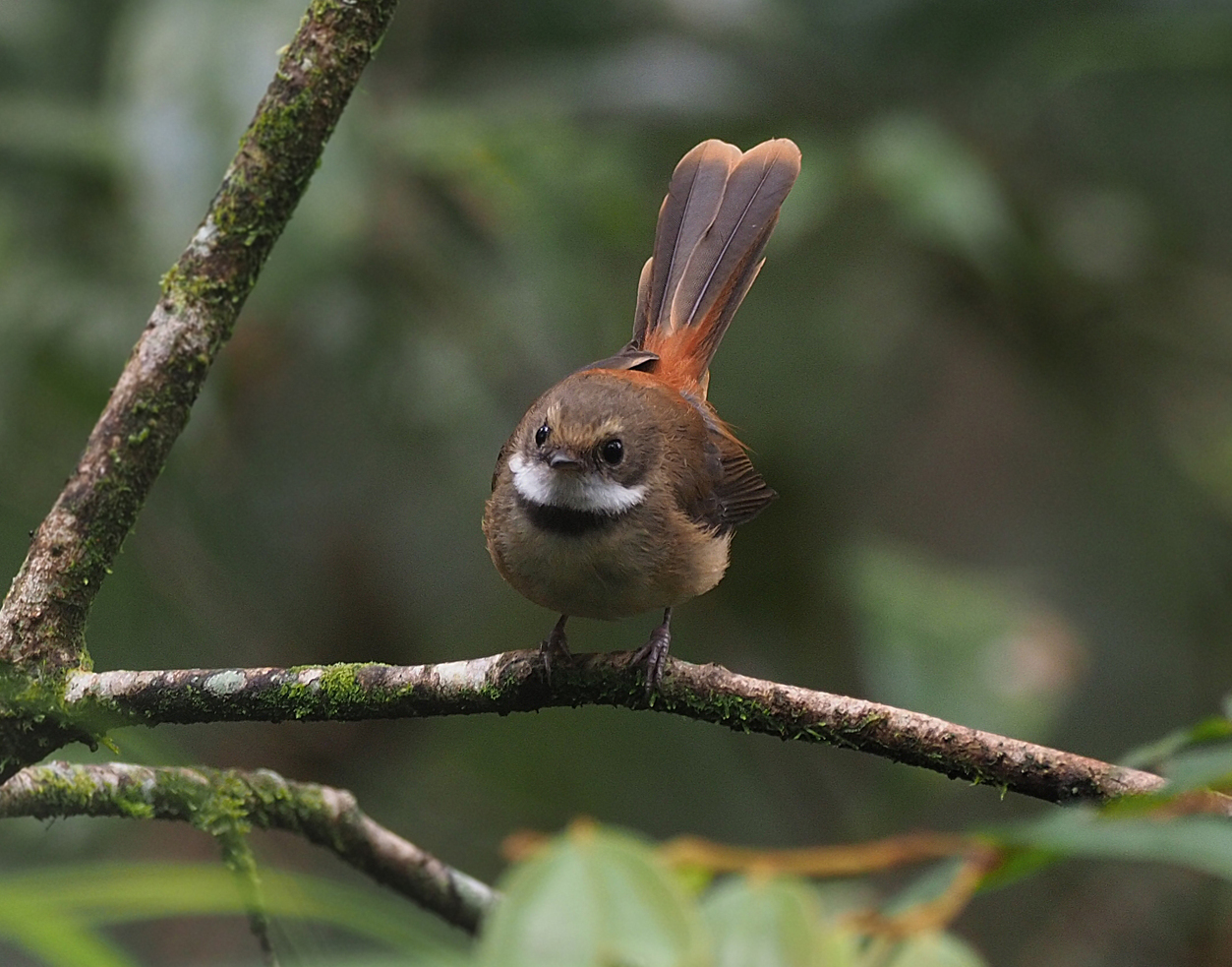

Conservation status
- Least Concern (IUCN 3.1)

Scientific classification
- Kingdom: Animalia
- Phylum: Chordata
- Class: Aves
- Order: Passeriformes
- Family: Rhipiduridae
- Genus: Rhipidura
- Species: R. superflua

Binomial name
- Rhipidura superflua Hartert, 1899

= Tawny-backed fantail =

Species of bird

The tawny-backed fantail (Rhipidura superflua), also known as the cinnamon-backed fantail, is a species of bird in the family Rhipiduridae. It is endemic to Buru island in Indonesia. Its natural habitats are subtropical or tropical moist lowland forests and subtropical or tropical moist montane forests. The species occupies an area of larger than 20,000 km^{2} and has a stable population of above 10,000, and thus is not considered as threatened.
