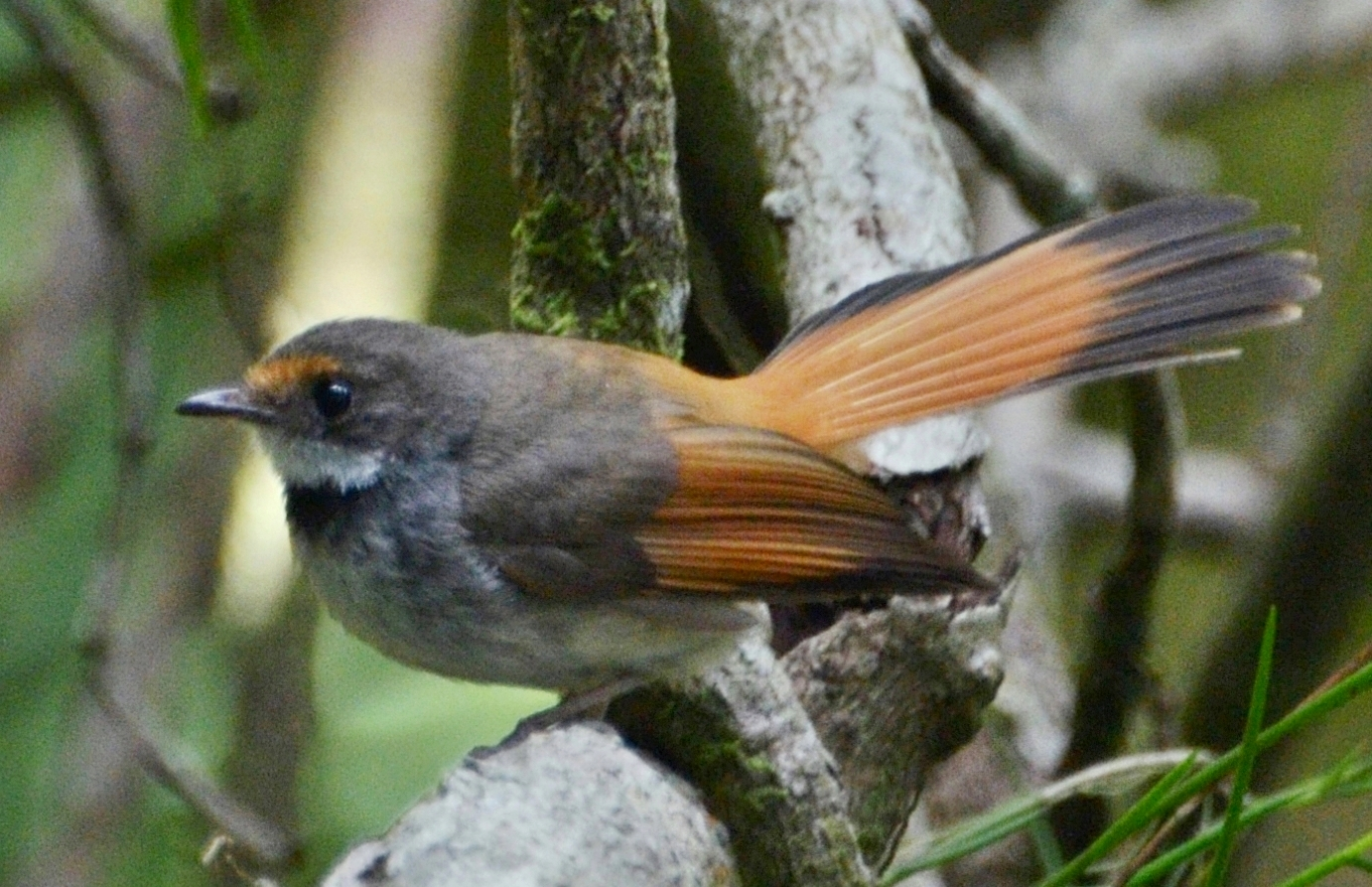

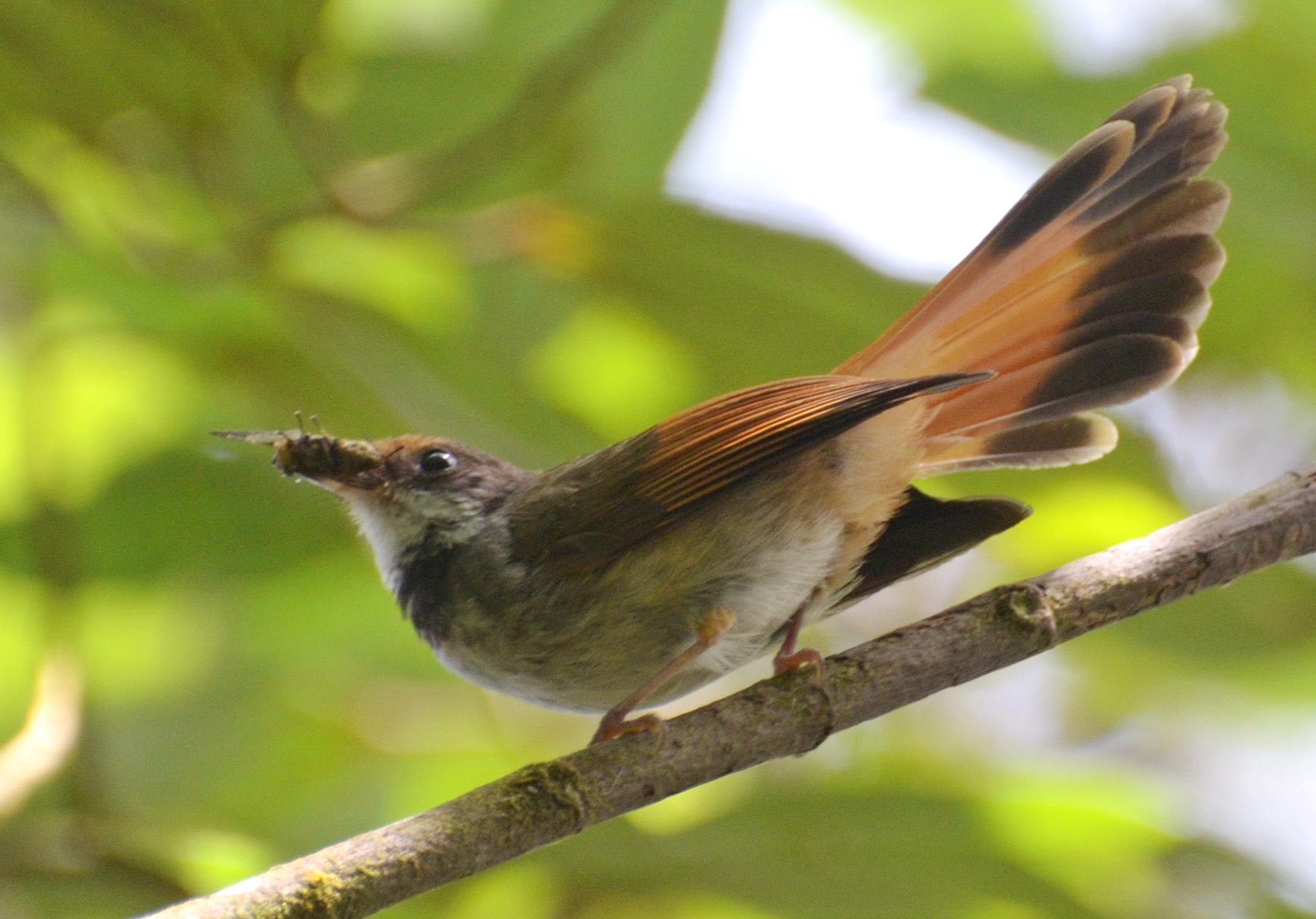
- Rhipidura teysmanni coomansi at Mt Soputan

Conservation status
- Least Concern (IUCN 3.1)

Scientific classification
- Kingdom: Animalia
- Phylum: Chordata
- Class: Aves
- Order: Passeriformes
- Family: Rhipiduridae
- Genus: Rhipidura
- Species: R. teysmanni

Binomial name
- Rhipidura teysmanni Büttikofer, 1892
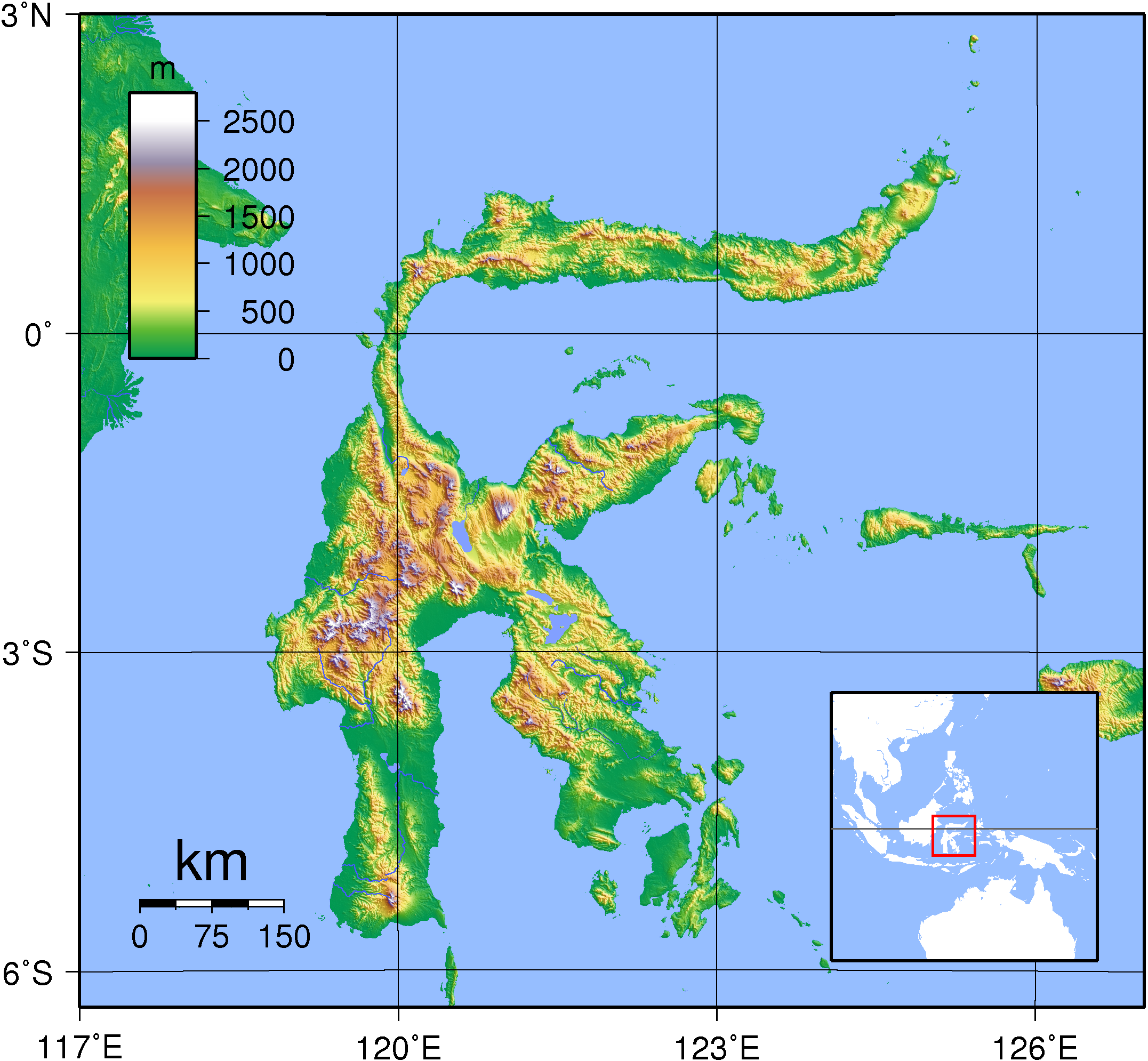

= Sulawesi fantail =

Species of bird

The Sulawesi fantail (Rhipidura teysmanni) is a species of bird in the family Rhipiduridae. It is endemic to Sulawesi in Indonesia. Its natural habitats are subtropical or tropical moist lowland forests and subtropical or tropical moist montane forests.

There are three subspecies recognized:

- R. t. teysmanni Büttikofer, 1892 - montane southwestern Sulawesi
- R. t. toradja Stresseman, 1931 - montane central and southeastern Sulawesi
- R. t. coomansi van Marle, 1940 - montane northern Sulawesi

The subspecies coomansi was recognized by the International Ornithological Congress in 2022.
