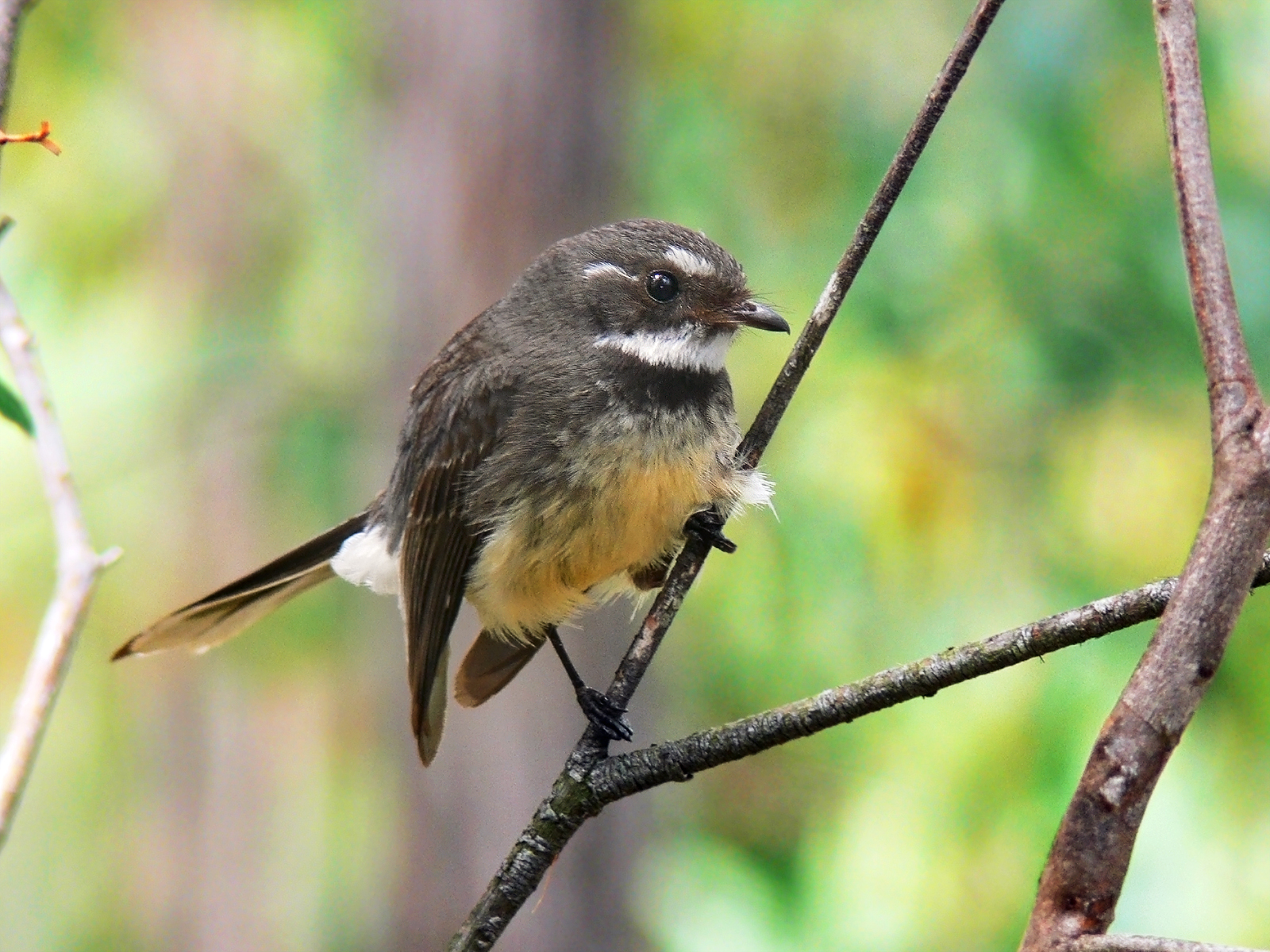
- Grey fantail (Rhipidura albiscapa)

Scientific classification
- Kingdom: Animalia
- Phylum: Chordata
- Class: Aves
- Order: Passeriformes
- Superfamily: Corvoidea
- Family: Rhipiduridae; Sundevall, 1872

Genera
- see text

= Rhipiduridae =

Family of birds

The family Rhipiduridae are small insectivorous birds of Australasia, Southeast Asia and the Indian subcontinent that includes the fantails and silktails.

== Taxonomy and systematics ==
The family contains 64 species which are divided into four genera:

- Subfamily Rhipidurinae:
  - Rhipidura – typical fantails (60 species)
- Subfamily Lamproliinae:
  - Chaetorhynchus – drongo fantail
  - Eutrichomyias – cerulean flycatcher
  - Lamprolia – silktails (2 species)
