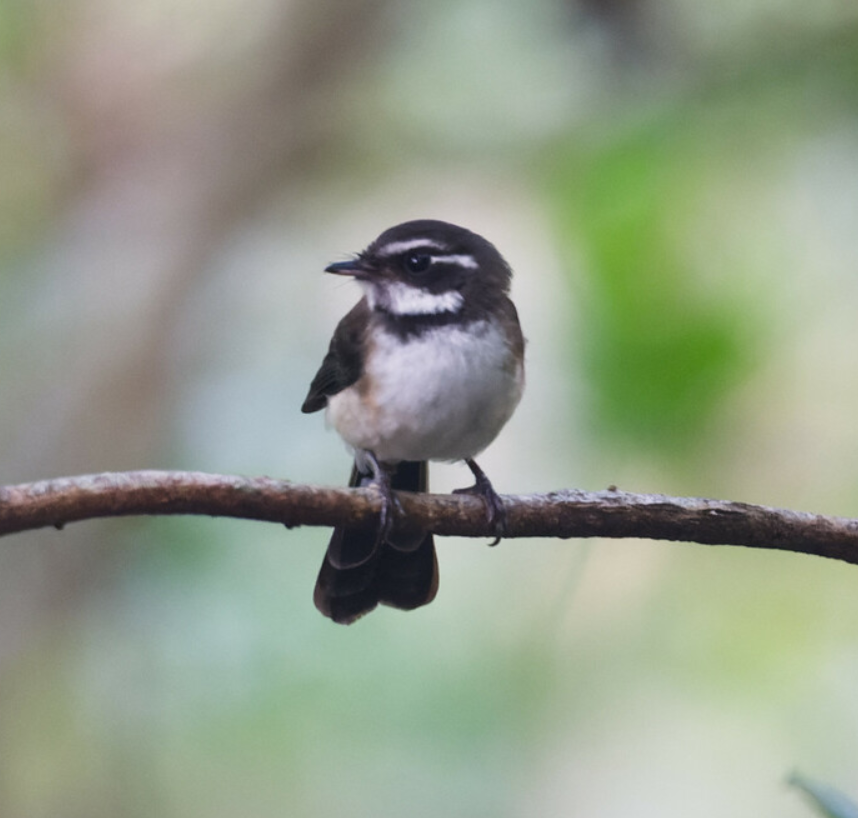

Conservation status
- Near Threatened (IUCN 3.1)

Scientific classification
- Kingdom: Animalia
- Phylum: Chordata
- Class: Aves
- Order: Passeriformes
- Family: Rhipiduridae
- Genus: Rhipidura
- Species: R. personata

Binomial name
- Rhipidura personata E.P. Ramsay, 1875
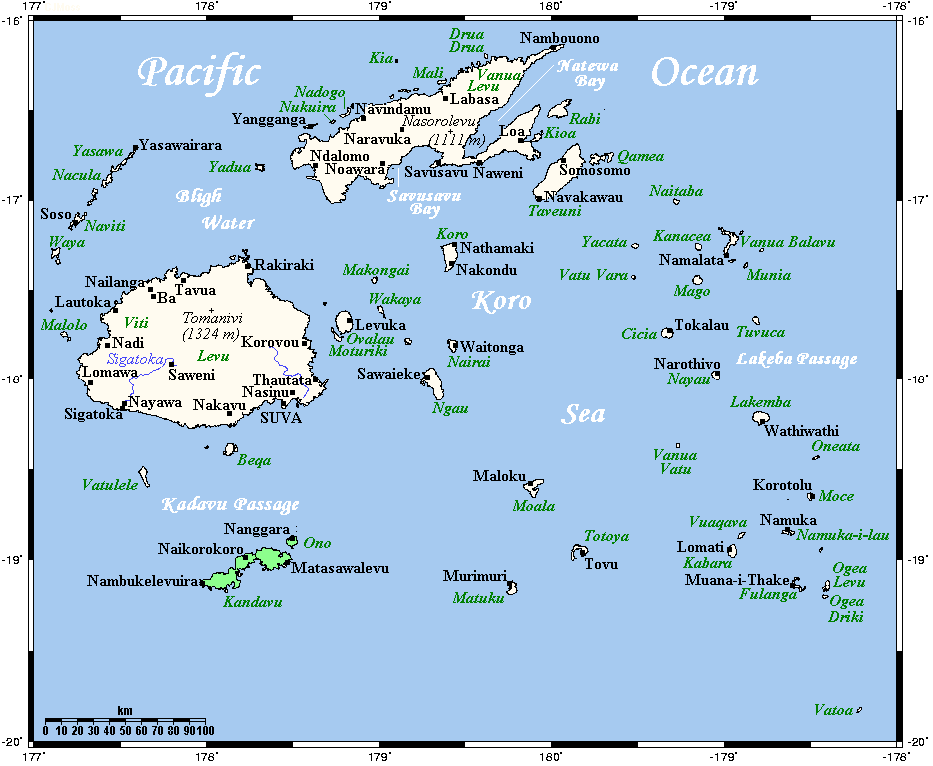
- Approximate species' distribution = Extant (resident)

= Kadavu fantail =

Species of bird

The Kadavu fantail (Rhipidura personata) is a species of bird in the fantail family Rhipiduridae. It is endemic to Kadavu and Ono in the Kadavu archipelago, in southern Fiji. It is closely related to the streaked fantail of the rest of Fiji, and forms a superspecies with the numerous island species of fantail ranging from the Solomon Islands (the brown fantail) to Samoa (the Samoan fantail).

The Kadavu fantail is restricted to tropical moist lowland forests, where it feeds by flycatching for insects. It sometimes joins mixed-species feeding flocks with Polynesian trillers, Fiji bush warblers and silvereyes. The breeding season is October and November. It is threatened by habitat loss.

== Taxonomy ==
Kadavu fantail (R. personata) forms a superspecies with:

- Brown fantail (R. drownei)
- Makira fantail (R. tenebrosa)
- Rennell fantail (R. rennelliana)
- Streaked fantail (R. verreauxi)
- Samoan fantail (R. nebulosa)
