= Makira fantail =

Conservation status
- Near Threatened (IUCN 3.1)

Scientific classification
- Kingdom: Animalia
- Phylum: Chordata
- Class: Aves
- Order: Passeriformes
- Family: Rhipiduridae
- Genus: Rhipidura
- Species: R. tenebrosa

Binomial name
- Rhipidura tenebrosa Ramsay, 1882

Species of bird

The Makira fantail or dusky fantail (Rhipidura tenebrosa) is a species of bird in the family Rhipiduridae. It is endemic to the Solomon Islands.

Its natural habitat is subtropical or tropical moist lowland forests. It is threatened by habitat loss.

== Taxonomy ==
Makira fantail (R. tenebrosa) forms a superspecies with:

- Brown fantail (R. drownei)
- Rennell fantail (R. rennelliana)
- Streaked fantail (R. verreauxi)
- Kadavu fantail (R. personata)
- Samoan fantail (R. nebulosa)
