= Nabukelevu =

Volcano in the Fiji Islands

Coordinates: 19.12°S 177.98°E

- Mount Washington
- Location within Fiji

Highest point
- Elevation: 805 m (2,641 ft)

Geography
- Country: Fiji
- Division: Western Division
- Island: Kadavu

Nabukelevu also known as Mt. Washington is a potentially active lava dome complex volcano located on the southwest portion of Kadavu Island in Fiji. It is 805 metres (2,641 ft) tall, and last erupted around 1660. It has formed lava domes

Nabukelevu is the only area in west Kadavu Island that retains extensive old-growth forest. A 2,900 hectares (7,200 acres) area centred on Nabukelevu is the Nabukelevu Important Bird Area. It supports populations of vulnerable Collared Petrel and Crimson shining parrot, and near threatened Whistling fruit dove and Kadavu fantail. The Collared Petrel breeding site and unique landscape of the mountain contribute to its national significance as outlined in Fiji's Biodiversity Strategy and Action Plan.

== Geology ==
Nabukelevu is the youngest volcano in a Plio–Pleistocene chain of volcanic islands associated with a now inactive subduction zone. There were four Holocene eruptive episodes: dating 246 ±70 BCE, 318 ±40 CE, 1224 ±50 CE, and 1630 ±50 CE. These eruptions were characterized by pyroclastic flows and tephra. There is also evidence of debris avalanches which measured between 10–100 million m3 of material.
