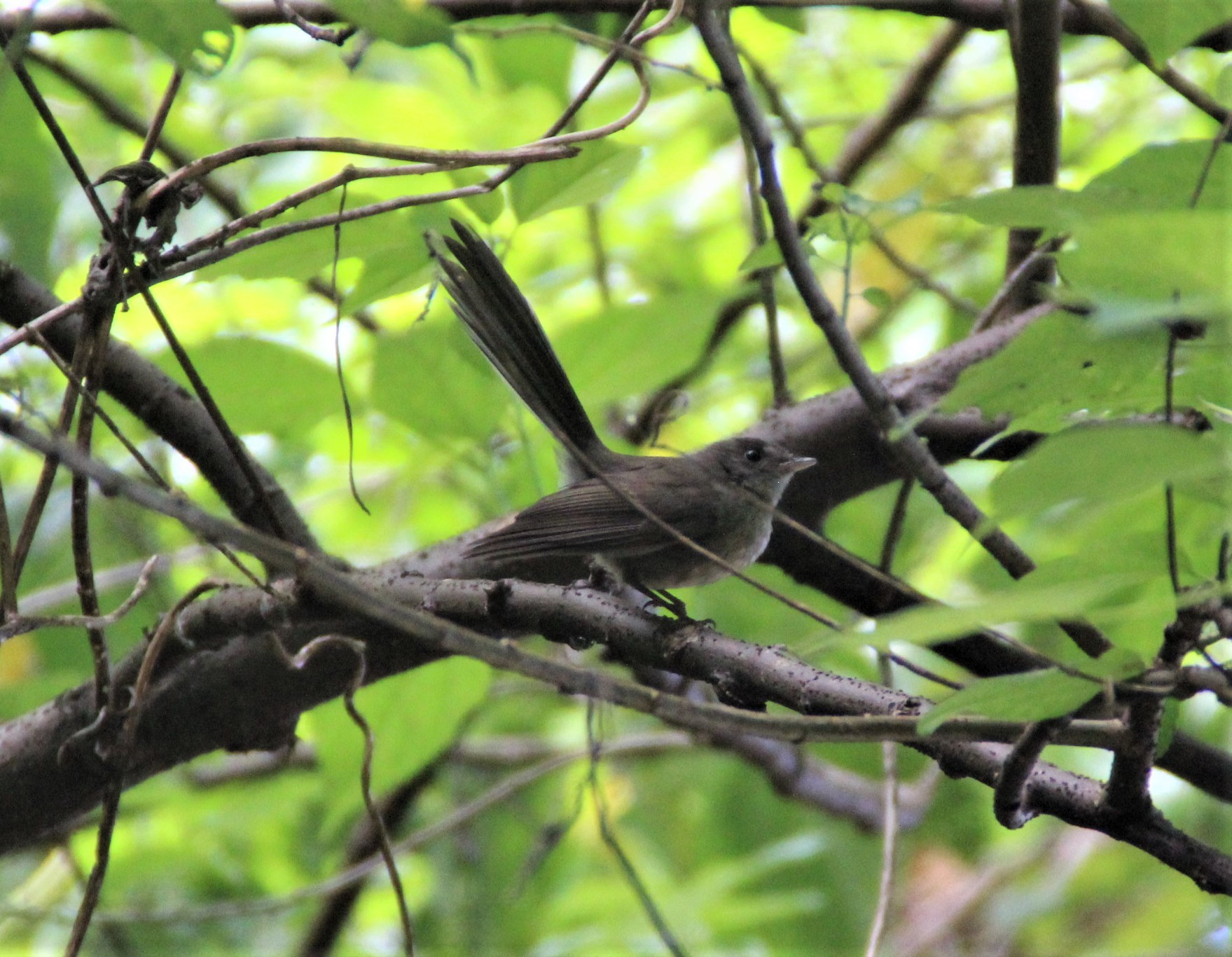

Conservation status
- Least Concern (IUCN 3.1)

Scientific classification
- Kingdom: Animalia
- Phylum: Chordata
- Class: Aves
- Order: Passeriformes
- Family: Rhipiduridae
- Genus: Rhipidura
- Species: R. rennelliana

Binomial name
- Rhipidura rennelliana Mayr, 1931
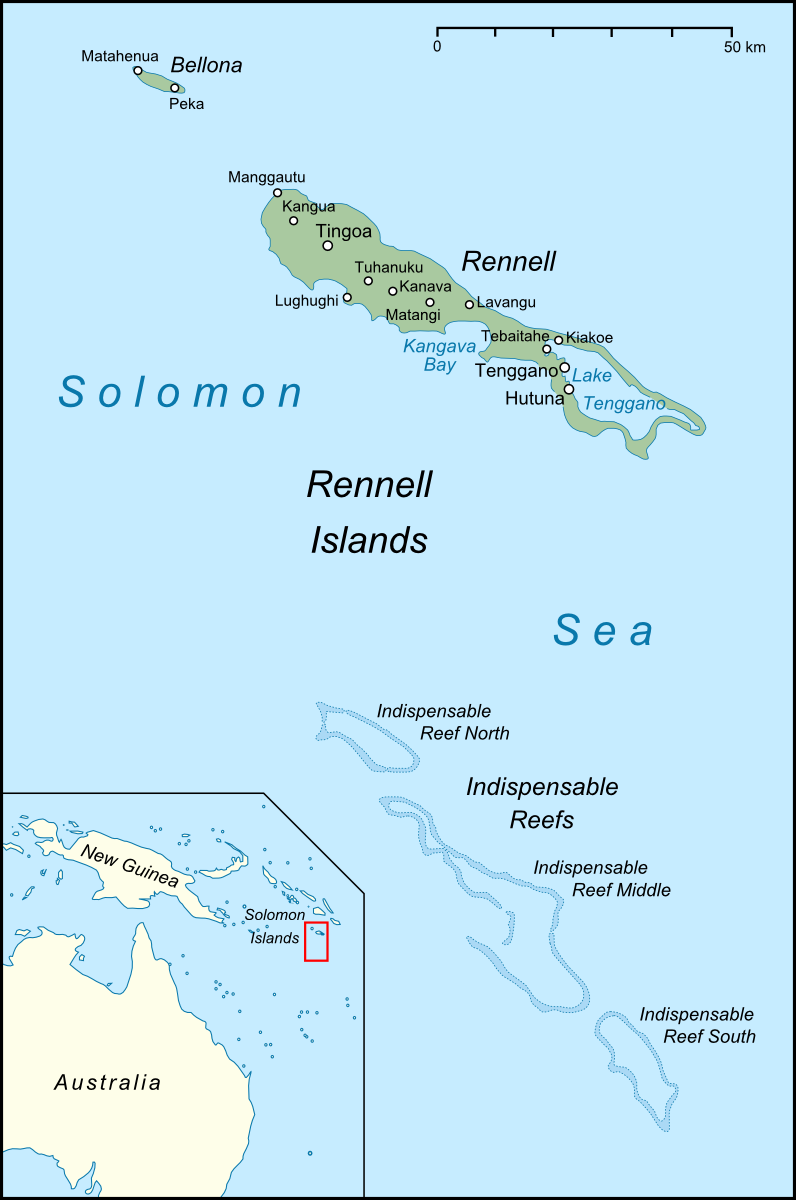

= Rennell fantail =

Species of bird

The Rennell fantail (Rhipidura rennelliana) is a species of bird in the family Rhipiduridae. It is endemic to Rennell Island (Solomon Islands).

Its natural habitat is subtropical or tropical moist lowland forests.

== Description ==
The plumage is mostly mouse-brown, while the color of throat is somewhat paler. There is a reddish stripe on the wing. The long tail, which the bird often spreads, is with a pale fringe. Avoids open spaces, preferring forest (mostly virgin ones). This is the only fantail on Rennell Island. The usual sound is piercing and squeaky.

== Taxonomy ==
Rennell fantail (R. rennelliana) forms a superspecies with:

- Brown fantail (R. drownei)
- Makira fantail (R. tenebrosa)
- Streaked fantail (R. verreauxi)
- Kadavu fantail (R. personata)
- Samoan fantail (R. nebulosa)
