= Kadavu Island =

Island of Fiji

Kadavu
- Island
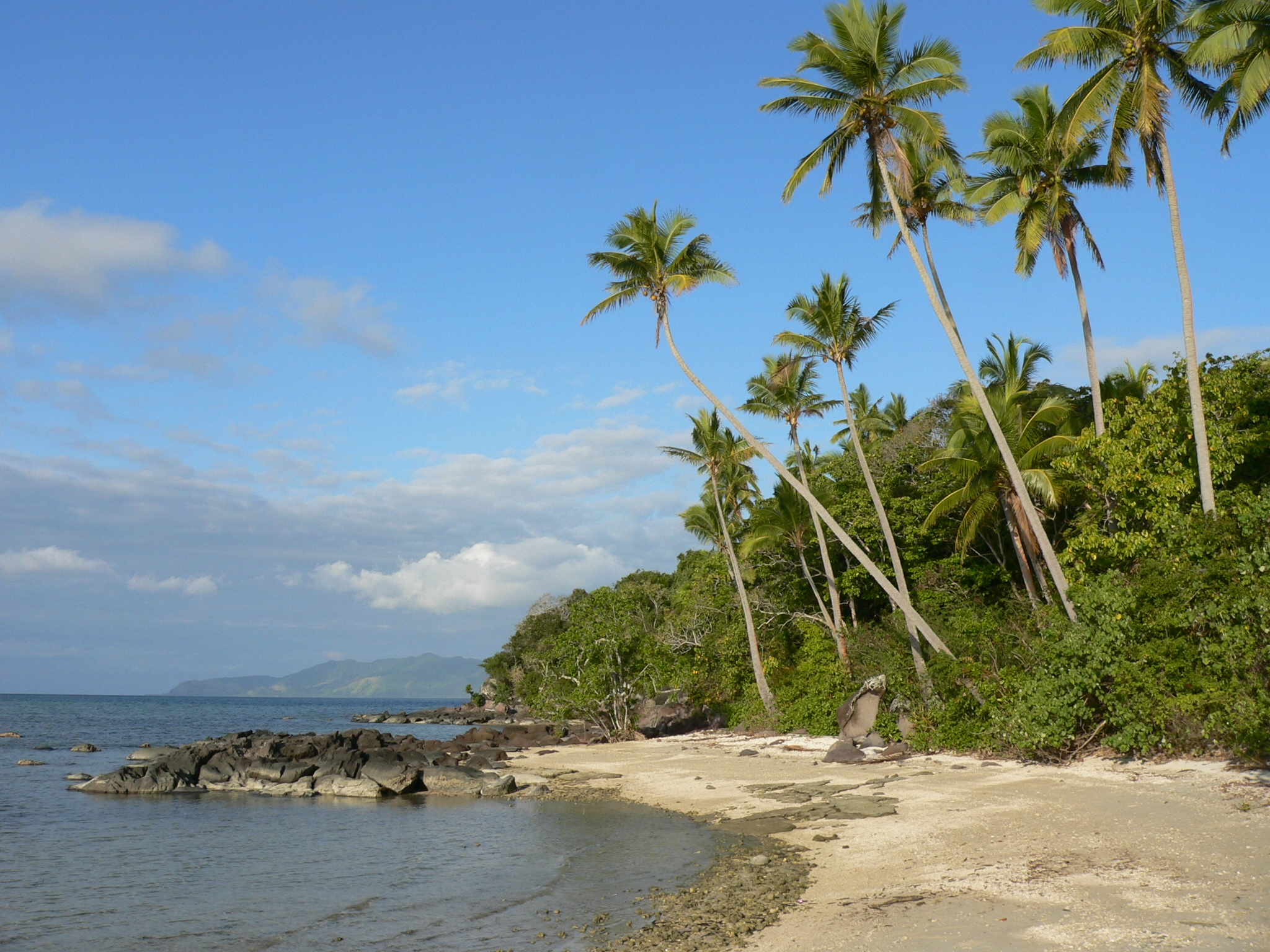
- Kadavu coastline

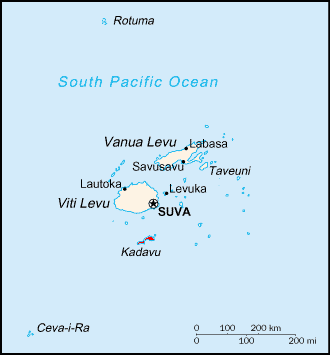
- Map of Fiji, showing Kadavu (in red) to the south of Viti Levu

- Location in Fiji
- Country: Fiji
- Island group: Kadavu Group
- Division: Eastern Division
- Province: Kadavu

Area
  - Total: 411 km^{2} (159 sq mi)
- Elevation: 805 m (2,641 ft)

Population (2007)
  - Total: 10,167
  - Density: 24.7/km^{2} (64.1/sq mi)

Kadavu (pronounced [kanˈdaβu]), with an area of 411 square kilometres (159 sq mi), is the fourth largest island in Fiji, and the largest island in the Kadavu Group, a volcanic archipelago consisting of Kadavu, Ono, Galoa and a number of smaller islands in the Great Astrolabe Reef. Its main administrative centre is Vunisea, which has an airport, a high school, a hospital, and a government station, on the Namalata Isthmus where the island is almost cut in two. Suva, Fiji's capital, lies 88 kilometres (55 miles) to the north of Kadavu. The population of the island province was 10,167 at the most recent census in 2007.

Kadavu Island belongs to Kadavu Province.

== Geography ==
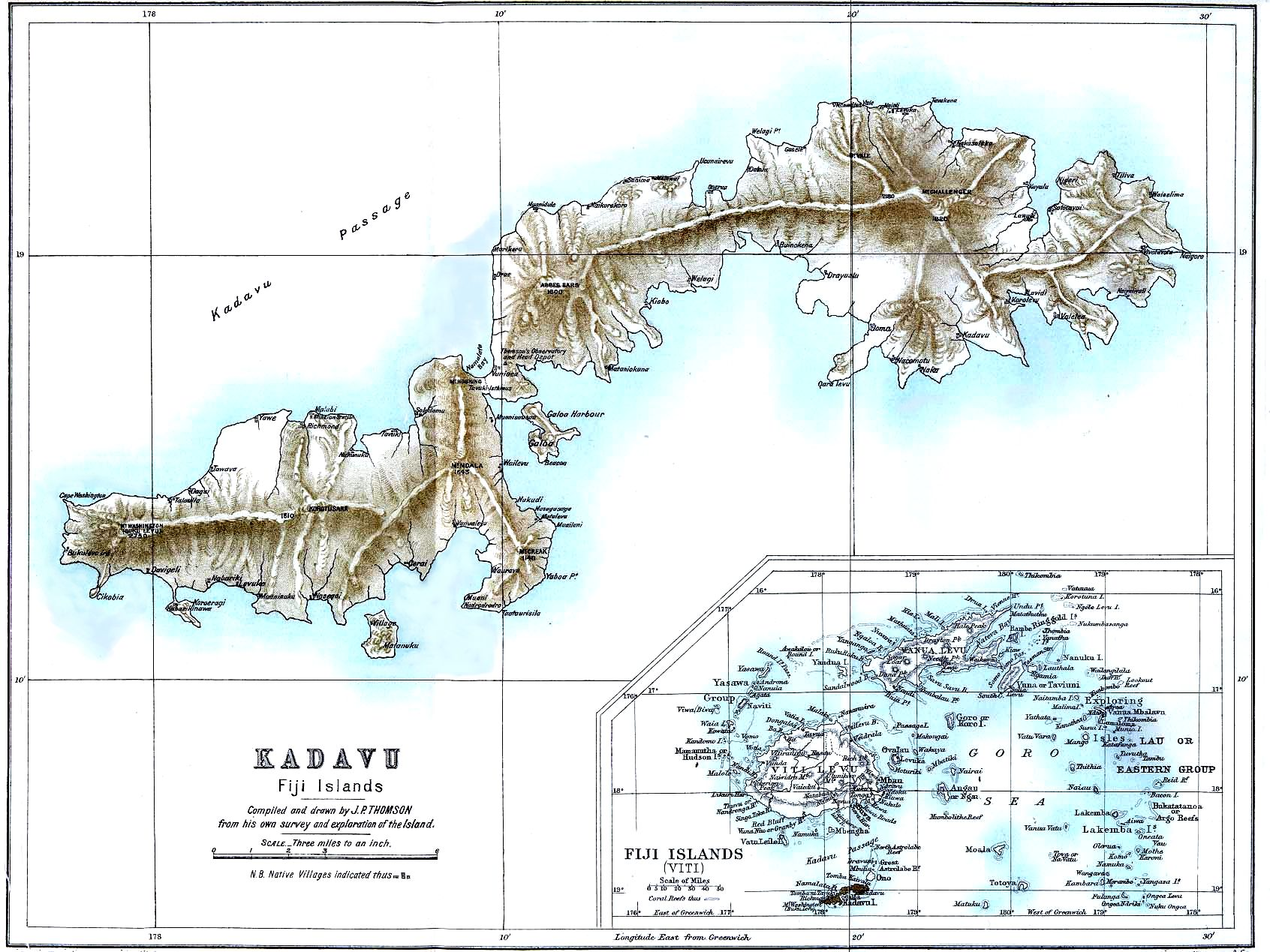
Kadavu on the map of J.P.Thomson, 1889

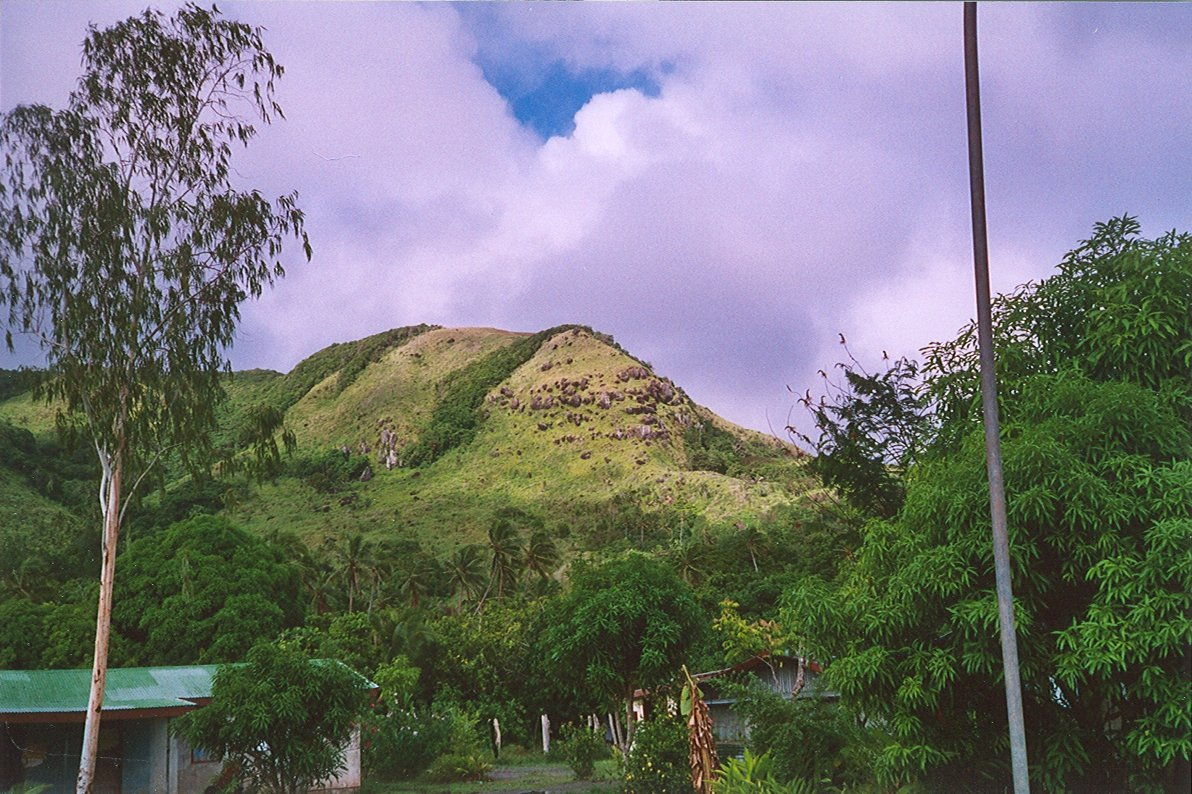
Vunisea

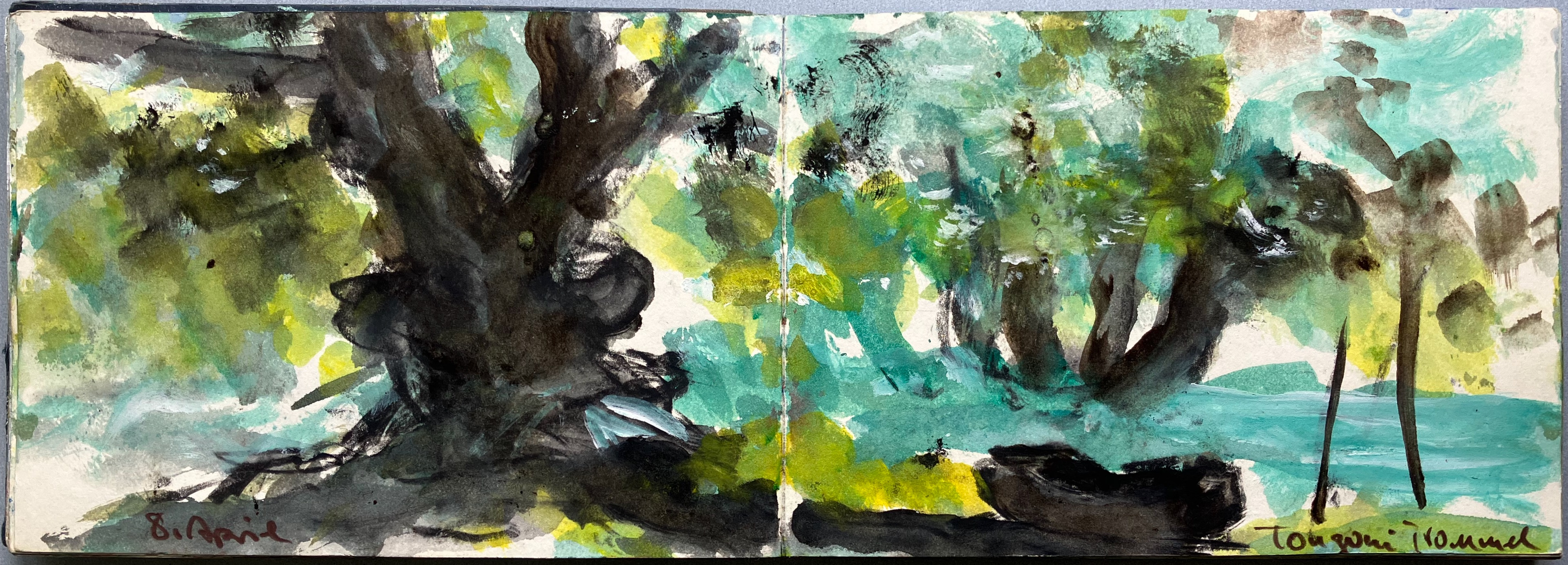
Ingo Kühl Tongoni drum, Double-page spread from the sketchbook South Seas III

The island is 60 kilometres (37 miles) long, with a width varying from 365 metres (1,198 ft) to 8 kilometres (5 miles). The island is almost sliced in two at the Vunisei Isthmus (Naceva) and the narrow Namalata Isthmus, which separates Namalata Bay on the northern coast from Galoa Harbour on the southern coast. Within Galoa Harbour lie Galoa Island and the tiny islet of Tawadromu. Kadavu is characterized by its rugged and mountainous terrain. The tallest mountain is Nabukelevu, also known as Mount Washington, which stands at 805 metres (2,641 feet) high, on the western end of the island.

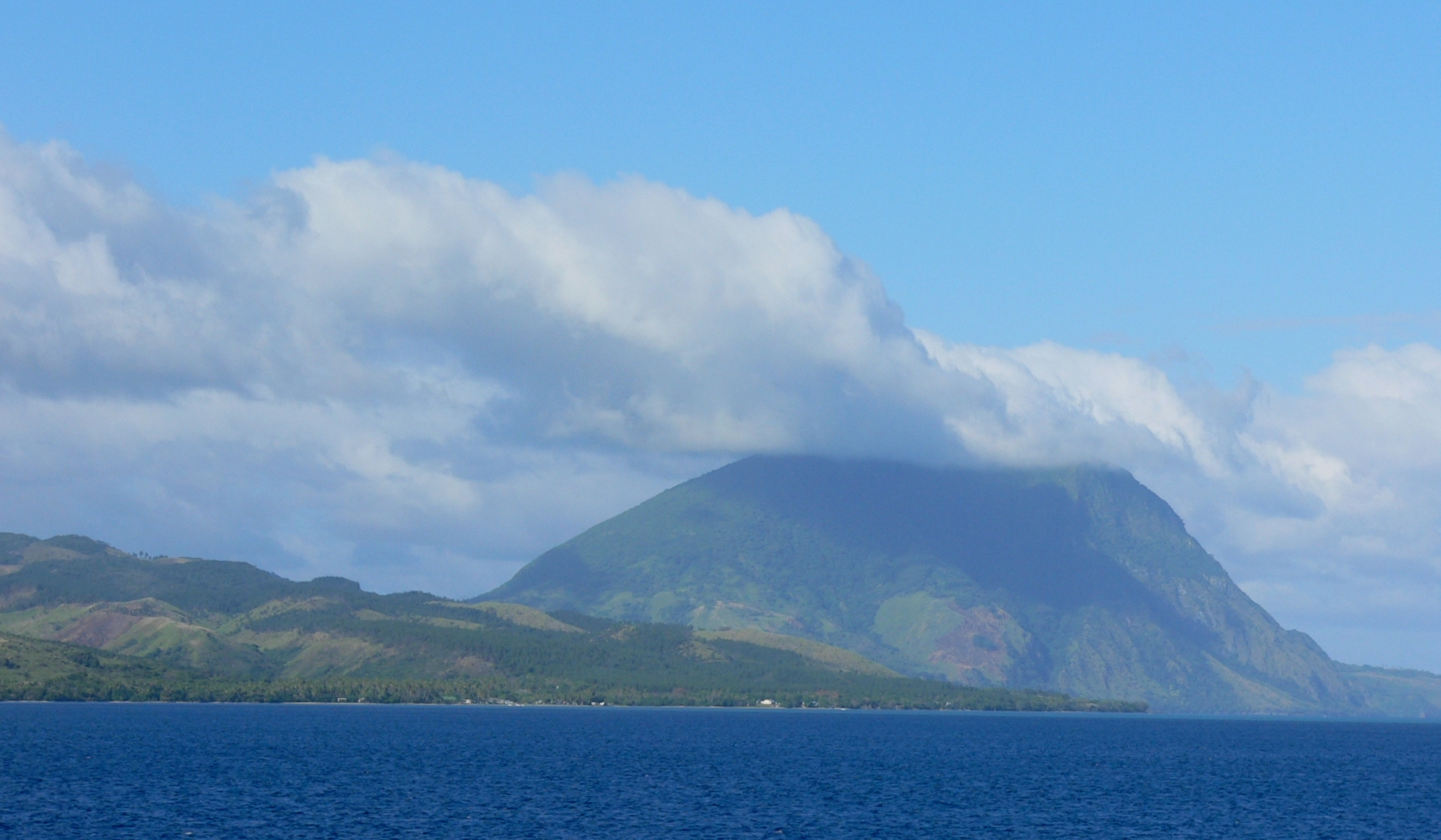
Nabukelevu (Mount Washington)

== Flora and fauna ==
Kadavu still has 75% of its original rainforest cover and a rich bird diversity, including four species endemic to the island, the velvet dove, the crimson shining-parrot, the Kadavu honeyeater and the Kadavu fantail, in addition to several endemic subspecies (such as a subspecies of the island thrush). Offshore, stringing around the south, east and then away to the north, is the Great Astrolabe Reef, a large barrier reef that is one of Fiji's premier scuba diving resorts.

A 7,800 hectares (19,000 acres) area covering the interior of the eastern part of the island is the East Kadavu Important Bird Area. It contains populations of the vulnerable Shy Ground-dove, Crimson Shining-parrot and Collared Petrel.

== Economy and culture ==
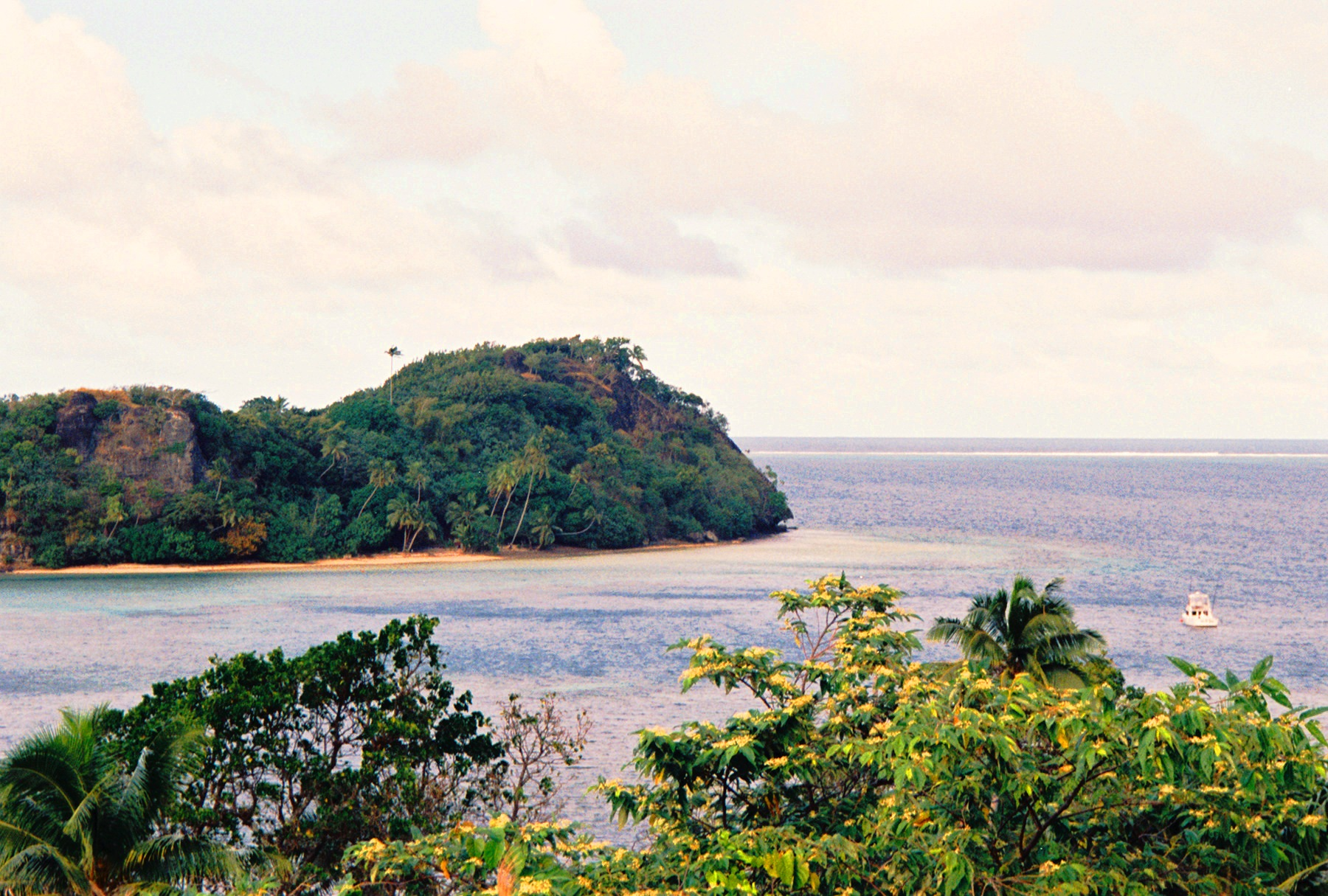
Over much of Kadavu the rainforest still reaches to the sea.

Kadavu is one of the least developed areas of Fiji. There are few roads, and the local economy is largely dependent on subsistence farming, supplemented by exports to Viti Levu. The main commercial crop is yaqona (known as Kava around the Pacific islands). There are no banks on Kadavu. Tourism is becoming popular, however, with snorkeling and diving among the major attractions. The chiefly system in Kadavu gives much greater authority to local chiefs than most other areas in Fiji, where local chiefs are more often subservient to a few "paramount chiefs."

On 17 December 2005, Ratu Josateki Nawalowalo, Chairman of the Kadavu Provincial Council, announced major development plans to build roads throughout the island and to upgrade jetties, improving Kadavu's links with the mainland. He revealed that much of the finance would be provided by the government of Taiwan.

== History ==
William Bligh was the first known European to sight Kadavu, which he discovered in 1792 on his second voyage to Fiji on HMS Providence. He was followed in 1799 by the United States vessel Ann & Hope, skippered by C. Bently en route from Australia. In 1827, French commander Dumont d'Urville nearly shipwrecked Astrolabe on the reef that now bears the vessel's name. The island later became home to beche-de-mer traders, as well as whalers from Sydney, Australia, and New England in the United States. Galoa Harbour became a regular port of call for vessels carrying mail between Sydney, San Francisco, and Auckland.

In 2002, during his one-year stay in the South Seas, the German painter Ingo Kühl visited Kadavu, lived with indigenous people in the remote settlement of Togoni, and created drawings and watercolors in sketchbooks that were exhibited at the Ethnological Museum of Berlin, Museen Dahlem, 2004/05. in 2004/2005. He describes this period in his „Tagebuch eines Malers“ (Diary of a Painter). ISBN 978-3-98741-065-9.

== Origin of the Kadavu People ==
Most Kadavuans are not sure where their ancestors may have originated from. Some say that they never travelled from other places but were always present on the island. While some have various theories. However, a well-known linguist feels that the people of Kadavu may have come from the East, given the similarity of words with the southernmost part of the Lauan group of islands and the core belief that Kadavu's ancestors settled from the East, as opposed to the rest of Fiji where the movement was Westwards. It can also be seen that Kadavuans generally possess Polynesian attributes, which may further add to the belief. Yet, the notion is debatable as Kadavu and Lau never had any affiliation in the past, be it tribal or provincial. It has only been in the last decade or so that the two provinces coined the term "Yanu" (meaning island or islanders), to forge a relationship. However the term "Yanu" is also called between Lau, Lomaiviti and Yasawa groups. Origin was that these islands never had a previous relationship and in Suva, these islands (Yanuyanu, later shortened to Yanu) were called between the smaller islands compared to Vitilevu and Vanualevu. The most famous theory is that the Kadavu people came from different parts of Fiji through Beqa and crossed through Deuba village.

== Pride of Kadavu ==
Kadavu Island is nicknamed "Bird land" and rightly so as it has a number of rare birds that are endemic to the island. These birds have survived on Kadavu due to the richness and abundance of natural resources as well as the climatic conditions of the island. The most famous bird is the Kadavu crimson shining-parrot, which stands out from other parrots in the country, with its blue-collar at the back of the neck. The Kadavu fantail, the whistling dove and the honeyeater are amongst other rare birds found only in Kadavu.

== Demographics ==
The Kadavu archipelago lies on Fiji's earthquake belt and cyclone path, making it prone to natural disasters. Its isolation from the mainland has historically posed challenges for its inhabitants. Despite these difficulties, Kadavuans have developed resilience and achieved prominence in various fields, holding top positions across the country. The "Kadavu House" in Suva stands as a symbol of their accomplishments. Kadavu is also notable for its significant charitable contributions. Wherever in the world they may find themselves, the people maintain a strong connection to their homeland and pride in their identity as "Kai Kadavu."

== Kadavuans ==
Well-known Kadavu residents include:

- Kaliopate Tavola, former Foreign Minister
- Konisi Yabaki of Tiliva village, former Forests and Fisheries Minister
- Lynda Tabuya also from Tiliva village, minister for women, children and poverty alleviation (since 24 December 2022)
- James Ah-Koy, former Minister for Finance, senator, and businessman
- Apaitia Seru, former Attorney General, Minister for Justice and Chief Magistrate
- Akuila Yabaki, former lawyer and Attorney-General the Kelemedi Bulewa of Ravitaki Village, Methodist minister and political activist
- Manu Korovulavula of Naikorokoro Village, former Senator, Minister for Transport, former CEO of Land Transport Authority, Chairman of the Fiji Sports Council, music composer and singer
- Epineri Vula of Tawava Village (Yawe), former lawyer, Supreme Court judge and senator,
- Josateki Nawalowalo, Chairman of the Kadavu Provincial Council and of the Fiji Kava Council.
- Jesoni Vitusagavulu, Fiji's former Ambassador to the United States.
- Sakiasi Waqanivavalagi, Former parliamentarian and PSC Chairman.
- Lavenia Yalovi, sportswoman and sports commentator

== Transport ==
Ferry service by Patterson Brothers Shipping Company connects Kadavu to Viti Levu. Also Goundar Shipping Limited (Lomaiviti Princess) and Liaona Shipping Limited. Fibre- glass boats and motor vehicles are also a source of transportation within the villages.

Kadavu Island is served by Vunisea Airport.
