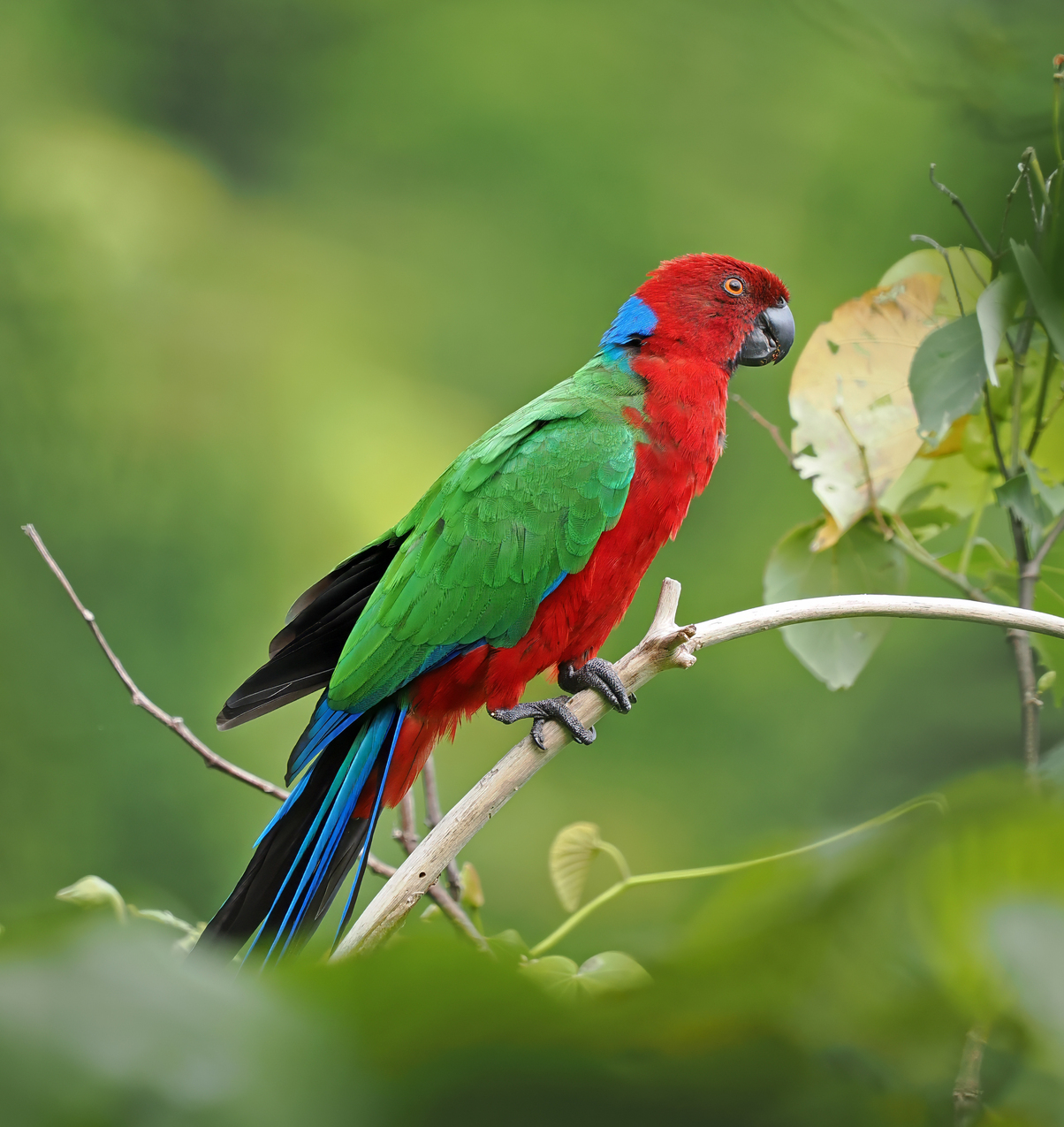

Conservation status
- Near Threatened (IUCN 3.1)

Scientific classification
- Kingdom: Animalia
- Phylum: Chordata
- Class: Aves
- Order: Psittaciformes
- Family: Psittaculidae
- Genus: Prosopeia
- Species: P. splendens

Binomial name
- Prosopeia splendens (Peale, 1849)

= Crimson shining parrot =

Species of bird

The crimson shining parrot (Prosopeia splendens) is a parrot from Fiji. The species is endemic to the islands of Kadavu and Ono in the Kadavu Group. The species was once considered conspecific with the red shining parrot of Vanua Levu and Taveuni, but is now considered its own species. The species is sometimes known as the Kadavu musk parrot.

The crimson shining parrot is a medium-sized parrot (45 cm) with a long tail and bright plumage. The head, breast and belly are covered in bright crimson-red, its back, wings and tail are green with hints of blue in the wing. It has a long winged appearance in flight, flying with undulating bouts of flaps and gliding. The species is very vocal; the shrieks and squawks of the crimson shining parrot are of a higher pitch than that of the red shining parrot. On Kadavu it is unlikely to be mistaken for the other species of parrot, the collared lory.

The crimson shining parrot is a common forest species that has recently taken to entering gardens and agricultural land. Pairs forage for seeds and fruits. The species has not been observed nesting but is assumed to be a hole nester like red shining parrot. The species is considered to be Near Threatened by the IUCN due to its restricted range, habitat loss and the illegal trade in parrots.
