= Penicillium dravuni =

Scientific classification
- Domain: Eukaryota
- Kingdom: Fungi
- Division: Ascomycota
- Class: Eurotiomycetes
- Order: Eurotiales
- Family: Aspergillaceae
- Genus: Penicillium
- Species: P. dravuni

Binomial name
- Penicillium dravuni J.E. Janso 2005

Type strain
- BPI 844248, F01V25

Species of fungus

Penicillium dravuni is a monoverticillate and sclerotium forming species of the genus of Penicillium which was isolated from the alga Dictyosphaeria versluyii in Dravuni on Fiji. Penicillium dravuni produces dictyosphaeric acids A, dictyosphaeric acids B and carviolin.

== See also ==
- List of Penicillium species
