= Naiqoro Passage =

Inlet in Fiji

Coordinates: 19°0′47″S 178°29′56″E

Naiqoro Passage is located near Kadavu Island in Fiji and is one of the main inlets to the Great Astrolabe Reef. It was officially recognized as a marine reserve by the Ministry of Fisheries in 2018. The passage is a dive site. The Society for the Conservation of Reef Fish Aggregations surveyed the area in 2011.
