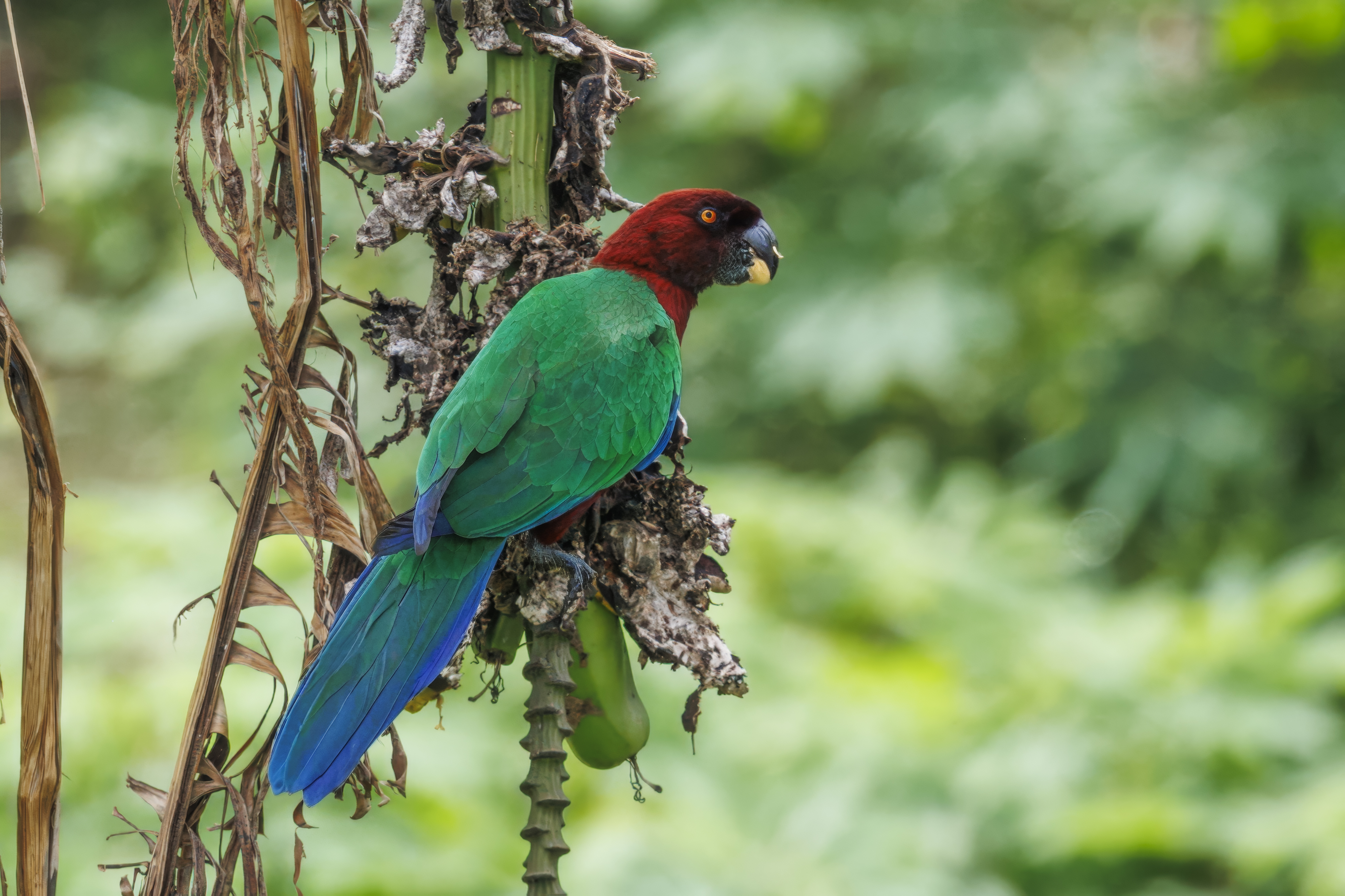
- On Taveuni

Conservation status
- Least Concern (IUCN 3.1)

Scientific classification
- Kingdom: Animalia
- Phylum: Chordata
- Class: Aves
- Order: Psittaciformes
- Family: Psittaculidae
- Genus: Prosopeia
- Species: P. tabuensis

Binomial name
- Prosopeia tabuensis (Gmelin, JF, 1788)

= Maroon shining parrot =

Species of bird

The maroon shining parrot or red shining-parrot (Prosopeia tabuensis), is a species of parrot in the family Psittaculidae. It is native to the islands of Vanua Levu and Taveuni in Fiji and was introduced to the islands of southern Tonga in prehistoric times. The species is sometimes considered conspecific with the crimson shining parrot of Kadavu. Its natural habitats are subtropical or tropical moist lowland forests and subtropical or tropical mangrove forests.

== Taxonomy ==
The maroon shining parrot was formally described in 1788 by the German naturalist Johann Friedrich Gmelin in his revised and expanded edition of Carl Linnaeus's Systema Naturae. He placed it with all the other parrots in the genus Psittacus and coined the binomial name Psittacus tabuensis. Gmelin based his description of the Tabuan parrot that the English ornithologist John Latham had described and illustrated in 1781 in his A General Synopsis of Birds. The maroon shining parrot is now placed with two other species in the genus Prosopeia that was introduced in 1854 by the French naturalist Charles Lucien Bonaparte. The genus name is from the Ancient Greek prosōpeion meaning "mask". The specific epithet tabuensis is from Tongatapu, the main island of Tonga.

Two subspecies are recognised:

- P. t. taviunensis (Layard, EL, 1876) – Taveuni, Qamea and Laucala (north-central Fiji, southwest Polynesia)
- P. t. tabuensis (Gmelin, JF, 1788) – Vanua Levu, Kioa, Koro and Gau (north-central Fiji, southwest Polynesia) and Eua (Tonga, south-central Polynesia)
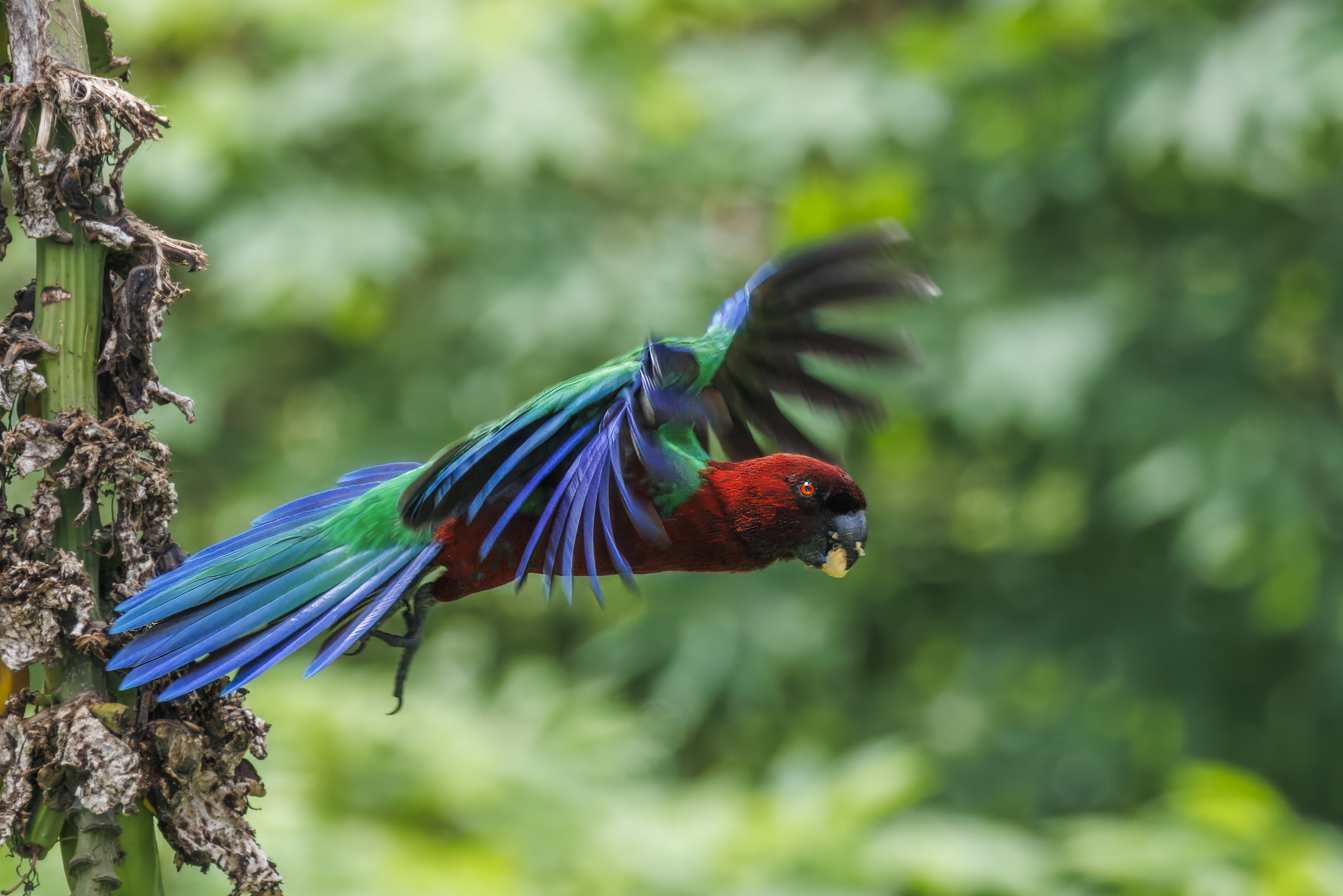

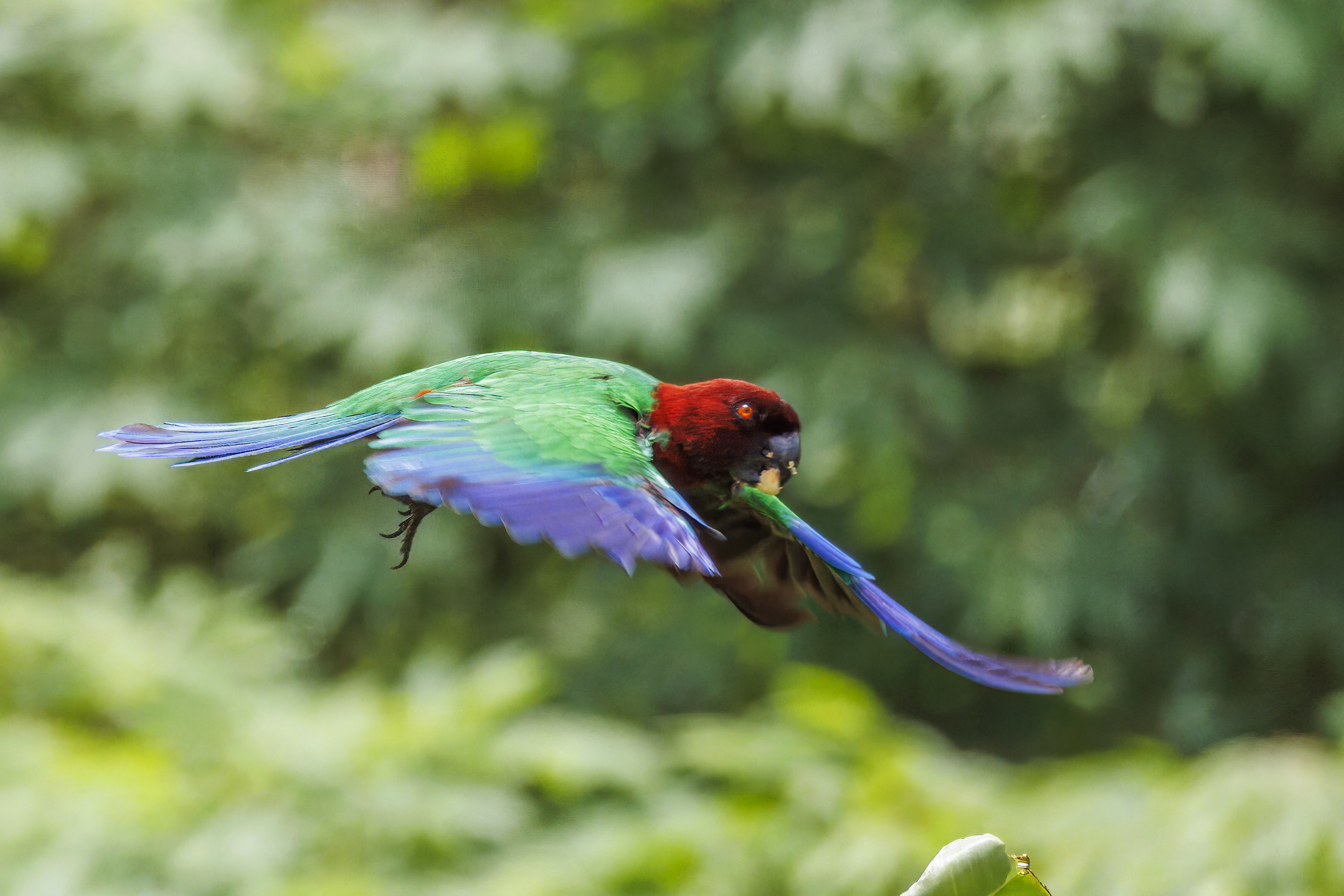

== Description ==
Adults have variable plumage; red/black face; rest of head brown/red, darker on hindcheeks; underparts dark maroon; dark blue collar across upper mantle, obvious in some birds but in others narrow and nearly absent; upperparts and tail green, feathers on rump in some individuals edged with maroon. Bill grey/black. Dark grey eye ring. Eye orange/yellow.

The subspecies P. t. taviunensis differs from the nominate in that it lacks the blue on the lower part of its neck and the part of the face between the eyes and the bill on the sides of its head the coloring is not as black. Additionally, there is not much red or maroon coloring on the feathering on the rear of the bird. It is also smaller in size.

The call of the maroon shining parrot is a mix of high-pitched nea-nea and arr sounds that are repeated in bursts, in addition to a variety of other squawks and hoots. The maroon shining parrot most commonly calls at night or when returning to its nest.

In Tonga the maroon shining parrot is known as the Koki for the sound it makes. The bird was first introduced to Tonga by trade in the eighteenth century, but is now found only on the island of ʻEua.

== Distribution and habitat ==
The maroon shining parrot is native to Fiji and Tonga. It is often found in mature forests as well as secondary growth forests, forested valleys (where they breed from June to January), coconut plantations, village gardens, farmlands, mangroves, and scrub. They are often found alone, in flocks up to 40 or in pairs.

== Behaviour and ecology ==
=== Food and feeding ===
The maroon shining parrot primarily feeds on seeds and fruits of various forest trees. Some of the specific species of trees which they eat from include the upper canopies of mango, guava, banana, and Papaya trees. In addition, the maroon shining parrot occasionally resorts to consuming insect larvae or corn and other crops from cornfields that it may occasionally raid. The strong bill of the maroon shining parrot allows it to grab onto branches and move in order to locate and attain food. Their bill also allows them to bite into wood in order to get to insects and/or their larvae when this is their food of choice. They hold their food in their feet so that they can use their bills to get more.

=== Breeding ===
Maroon shining parrots breed in their natural habitat during the cool and dry season. Breeding happens specifically in May to October. They make their nests lined with rotten wood in cavities of dead trees or the stumps of palm trees. The average clutch size of the maroon shining parrot is two or three eggs which are laid in tree cavities. The growth time lasts for about 25 to 34 days. Chicks are fed three times a day and the amount of food each receives depends on the age. When it comes time to leave the nest, the chicks are in the range of 7 to 9 weeks old.

== In captivity ==
Red-shining parrots are rarely raised in captivity. If they are wanted for breeding they can then be placed into breeding programs.

For the most part, the parrots are quiet during the day. Towards the evening is when they tend to be vocal. They can learn to talk. They prefer to fly around during the evening times. They also enjoy self-bathing.

These parrots should remain in stable climates; they are accustomed to warmth. The ideal living temperature for the maroon shining parrot is above 23 °C (73 °F). If the temperature drops below 15 °C (59 °F), there could be serious negative consequences for the bird, as it is not well-adapted to the cold.
