= Lavenia Yalovi =

Fijian sports commentator (born 1977 or 1978)

Lavenia Yalovi (born 1977 or 1978) is a Fijian sportswoman and one of the first Pacific Islander female sports commentators. She was member of the Fiji women's national football team.

== Early life ==
Lavenia was born in 1977 or 1978. She grew up on Kadavu Island and, as a child, was forbidden from playing sport as it was considered a male pursuit, given that she grew up in a traditional environment. Lavenia was allowed to play traditionally female sports such as softball and netball until she went to study in Suva, when she played football for the first time. She has also played hockey and rugby.

== Career ==
In Suva, she worked as a social sciences teacher and as a coach for girls’ school teams. She later joined the women's national football team, playing three international matches.

During the 2019 FIFA Women's World Cup in France, Lavenia made history by becoming part of the first all-female Pacific Islander commentary team alongside Vanutauans Adele Willie and Jennesa Hinge Moli. Lavenia commented in iTaukei. They were invited by FIFA in 2018 after completing a training programme in Fiji and made their debut in the Oceania Nations Cup, which caught FIFA's attention.

Lavenia coordinates the Get Into Rugby PLUS Fiji programme.
