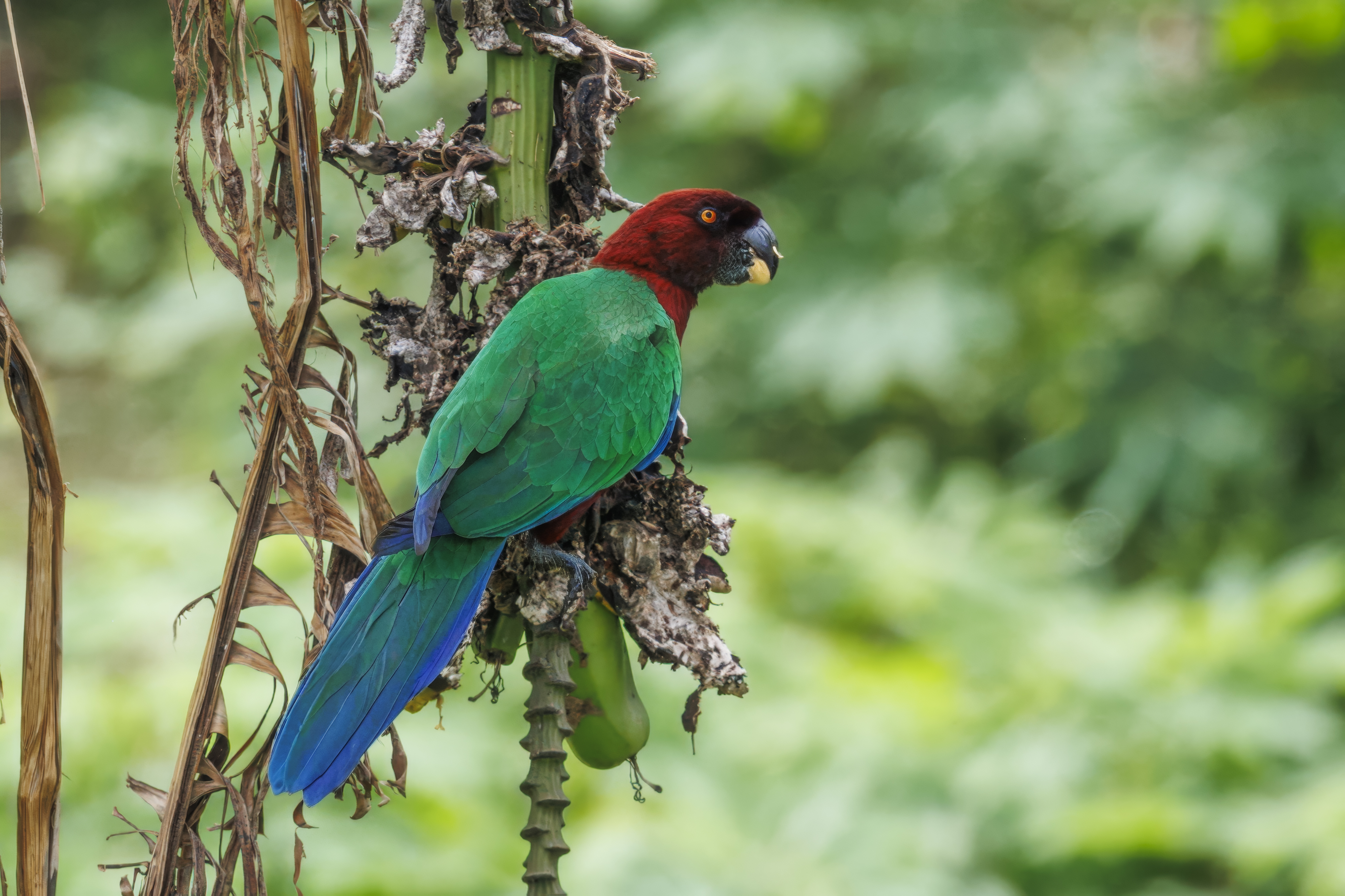
- Red shining parrot

Scientific classification
- Kingdom: Animalia
- Phylum: Chordata
- Class: Aves
- Order: Psittaciformes
- Family: Psittaculidae
- Tribe: Platycercini
- Genus: Prosopeia; Bonaparte, 1854

Type species
- Caracopsis personata (masked shining parrot) Gray, GR, 1848

= Shining parrot =

Shining parrots

Genus of birds

The shining parrots, Prosopeia, are a genus of parrots in the family Psittaculidae.

The genus is endemic to the islands of Fiji, although one species, the maroon shining parrot, has been introduced to Tonga. The three species are also sometimes known as musk parrots.

The shining-parrots have long tails, a languid crow-like flight and very bright plumage.

== Taxonomy ==
The genus Prosopeia was introduced in 1854 by the French naturalist Charles Lucien Bonaparte to accommodate a single species, the masked shining parrot. The genus name is from the Ancient Greek prosōpeion meaning "mask". The genus now contains three species:

Image	Scientific name	Common Name	Distribution
	Prosopeia personata	Masked shining parrot	Viti Levu in Fiji
	Prosopeia tabuensis	Maroon shining parrot	Fiji and Tonga
	Prosopeia splendens	Crimson shining parrot	Fiji

== See also ==
- Birds of Fiji
- Parrots of Oceania
