= Guadalcanal fantail =

Conservation status
- Least Concern (IUCN 3.1)

Scientific classification
- Kingdom: Animalia
- Phylum: Chordata
- Class: Aves
- Order: Passeriformes
- Family: Rhipiduridae
- Genus: Rhipidura
- Species: R. ocularis

Binomial name
- Rhipidura ocularis Mayr, 1931

Species of bird

The Guadalcanal fantail (Rhipidura ocularis) is a species of bird in the family Rhipiduridae. It is endemic to the island of Guadalcanal in the Solomon Islands. It was formerly considered as a subspecies of the brown fantail (now the Bougainville fantail). Its natural habitat is subtropical or tropical moist lowland forests. It is threatened by habitat loss.

== Taxonomy ==
The Guadalcanal fantail was formally described in 1931 by the American ornithologist Ernst Mayr based on specimens collected on the island of Guadalcanal in the Solomon Islands. Mayr considered the taxon as a subspecies of the brown fantail (now the Bougainville fantail) and coined the trinomial name Rhipidura drownei ocularis. The specific epithet is Latin meaning "of the eyes". The Guadalcanal fantail is now considered to be separate species. It is monotypic: no subspecies are recognised.
