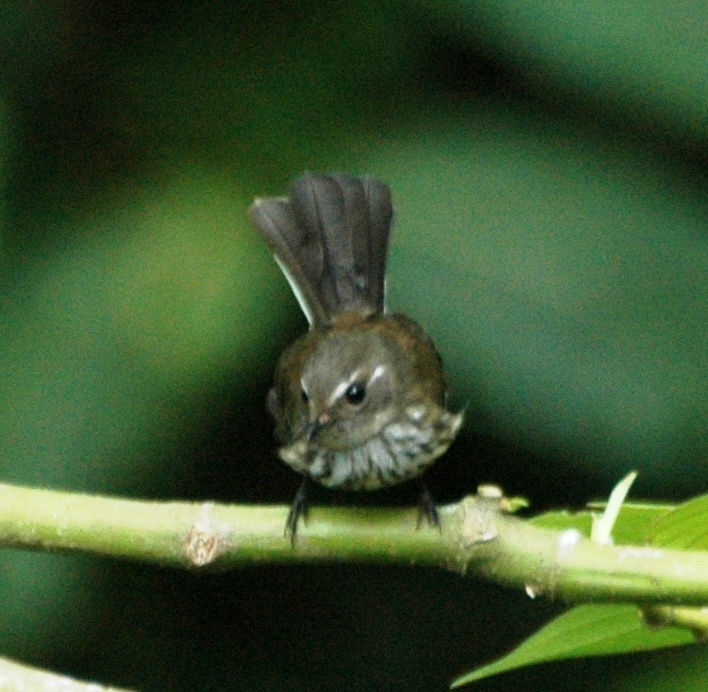
- Streaked fantail at Abaca village in Koroyanitu National Heritage Park, Viti Levu island, Fiji

Conservation status
- Least Concern (IUCN 3.1)

Scientific classification
- Kingdom: Animalia
- Phylum: Chordata
- Class: Aves
- Order: Passeriformes
- Family: Rhipiduridae
- Genus: Rhipidura
- Species: R. spilodera

Binomial name
- Rhipidura spilodera Gray, GR, 1870

= Vanuatu streaked fantail =

Species of bird

The Vanuatu streaked fantail (Rhipidura spilodera) is a species of bird in the family Rhipiduridae which is endemic to the Melanesian island of Vanuatu. It was formerly considered to be subspecies of the streaked fantail (now the New Caledonian streaked fantail). Its natural habitat is subtropical or tropical moist lowland forests.

== Description ==
The Vanuatu streaked fantail is a small passerine with a long, fanned tail. The adults have white underparts and dark, grayish-brown wings and backs. Their breasts and lower throats are densely patterned with dark triangular spots and blurry streaking. They have white stripes in front of and behind their eyes. The juveniles tend to look like slightly duller versions of the adults, and they do not exhibit sexual dimorphism.

== Taxonomy ==
The Vanuatu streaked fantail was formally described in 1870 by the English zoologist George Gray from a specimen that had been obtained from the island of Vanuatu by the collector Julius Brenchley. Gray coined the binomial name Rhipidura spilodera. The specific epithet combines the Ancient Greek spilos meaning "spot" with dera meaning "neck". This species was formerly treated as a subspecies of the streaked fantail (now the New Caledonian streaked fantail), but was split due to differences in morphology and vocalization.

== Habitat and distribution ==
The Vanuatu streaked fantail exclusively lives in forested areas on the islands of Vanuatu in the South Pacific Ocean. They tend to avoid open areas and prefer dense forest patches. Their aversion to open areas segregates them by habitat from the gray fantail, which occupies the forest edge and second growth areas. Their preferred elevation changes based on the forest patches on each island, with some living at up to 800m above sea level and others preferring to stay below 500m.

Streaked fantails exclude non-endemic species from the forests they occupy through preemptive competition. By occupying the space and using the resources, other species with similar niches cannot invade the same space.

== Behavior ==
=== Vocalization ===
The Vanuatu streaked fantail has a high-pitched, whistling song. They begin vocalizing up to an hour before dawn and will often be the first to start singing.

=== Reproduction ===
Not much is known about their reproduction, but they are thought to use similar strategies to other fantails. The New Zealand fantail, for example, has cooperative parenting where both the male and female incubate the eggs and brood the nestlings.

They create cup-shaped nests out of plant material that are bound using spiderwebs. Their eggs are cream in color with brown speckling on the larger side. Their nesting season typically lasts from September to January.

=== Diet ===
Vanuatu streaked fantails are insectivorous. They primarily forage by sallying in the mid to lower canopy and, less commonly, the undergrowth. They form mixed-species feeding flocks with other insectivores that use the same feeding strategy.

== Conservation status ==
The Vanuatu streaked fantail currently faces no threats, but their populations are in decline. It is one of the most common and widespread understory birds in the forests of Vanuatu. The estimated population in the Loru Protected Area as of 1997 was 882 individuals. The IUCN Red List classifies them as a species of least concern.
