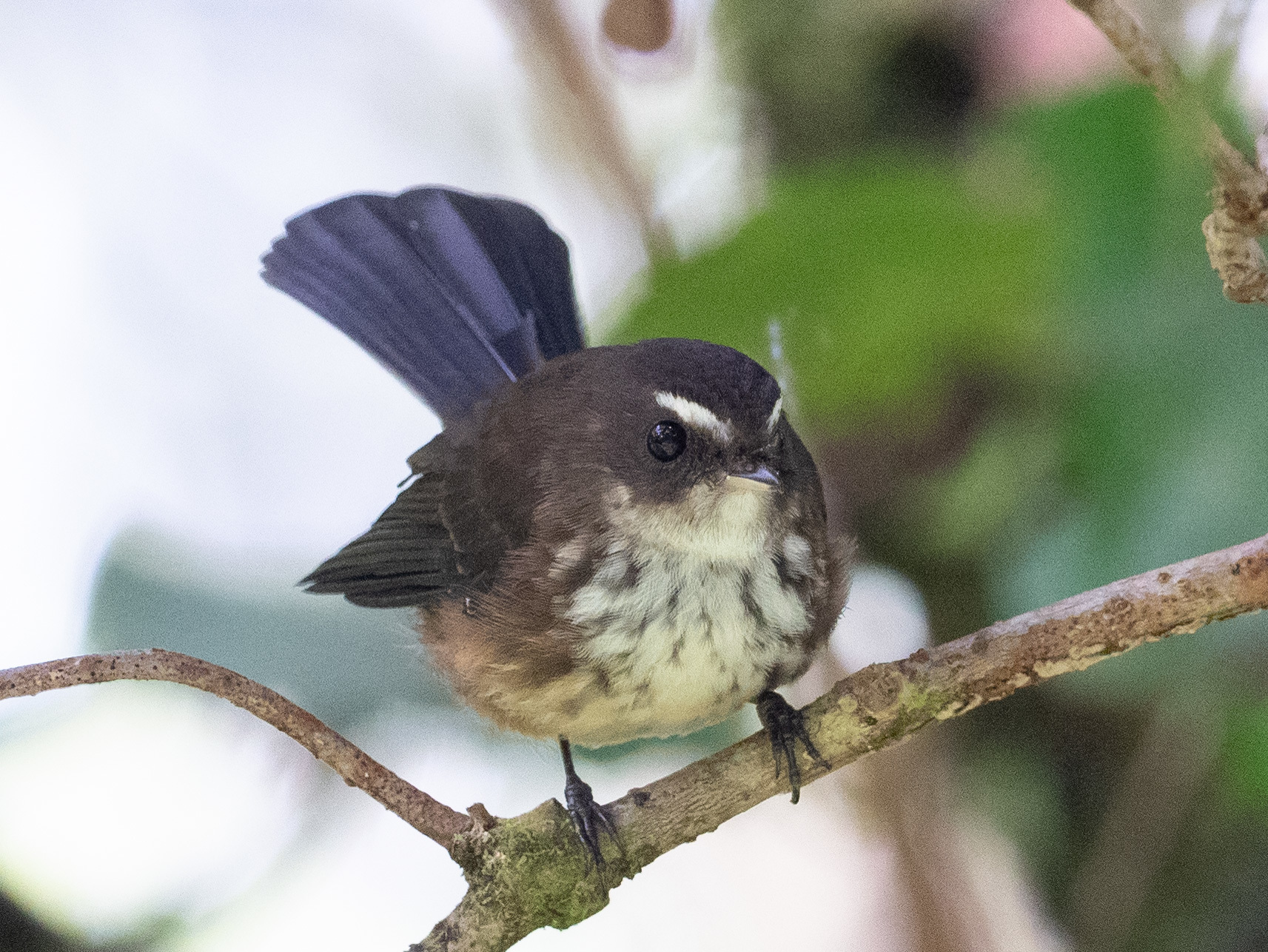
- Rhipidura layardi rufilateralis

Conservation status
- Least Concern (IUCN 3.1)

Scientific classification
- Kingdom: Animalia
- Phylum: Chordata
- Class: Aves
- Order: Passeriformes
- Family: Rhipiduridae
- Genus: Rhipidura
- Species: R. layardi

Binomial name
- Rhipidura layardi Salvadori, 1877

= Fiji streaked fantail =

Species of bird

The Fiji streaked fantail (Rhipidura layardi) is a species of bird in the family Rhipiduridae that is endemic to the islands of Fiji. It was formerly considered to be subspecies of the streaked fantail (now the New Caledonian streaked fantail). Its natural habitat is subtropical or tropical moist lowland forests.

== Taxonomy ==
The binomial name Rhipidura layardi was introduced in 1877 by the Italian zoologist Tommaso Salvadori as a replacement name for Rhipidura albogularis. This earlier name had been introduced by the naturalist Edgar Leopold Layard in 1875 based on a specimen collected on the island of Ovalau in the Fiji islands. The specific epithet albogulari was preoccupied as it had been used in 1831 in the combination Muscicapa (Muscylva) albogularis by the French naturalist René Lesson for the white-spotted fantail.

Three subspecies are recognised:

- R. l. rufilateralis Sharpe, 1879 – Taveuni (central north Fiji)
- R. l. layardi Salvadori, 1877 – Viti Levu and Ovalau (Lomaiviti group; west Fiji)
- R. l. erythronota Sharpe, 1879 – Vanua Levu and Yanganga (north of northwest Vanua Levu; central north Fiji)
