= Dravuni =

- Island
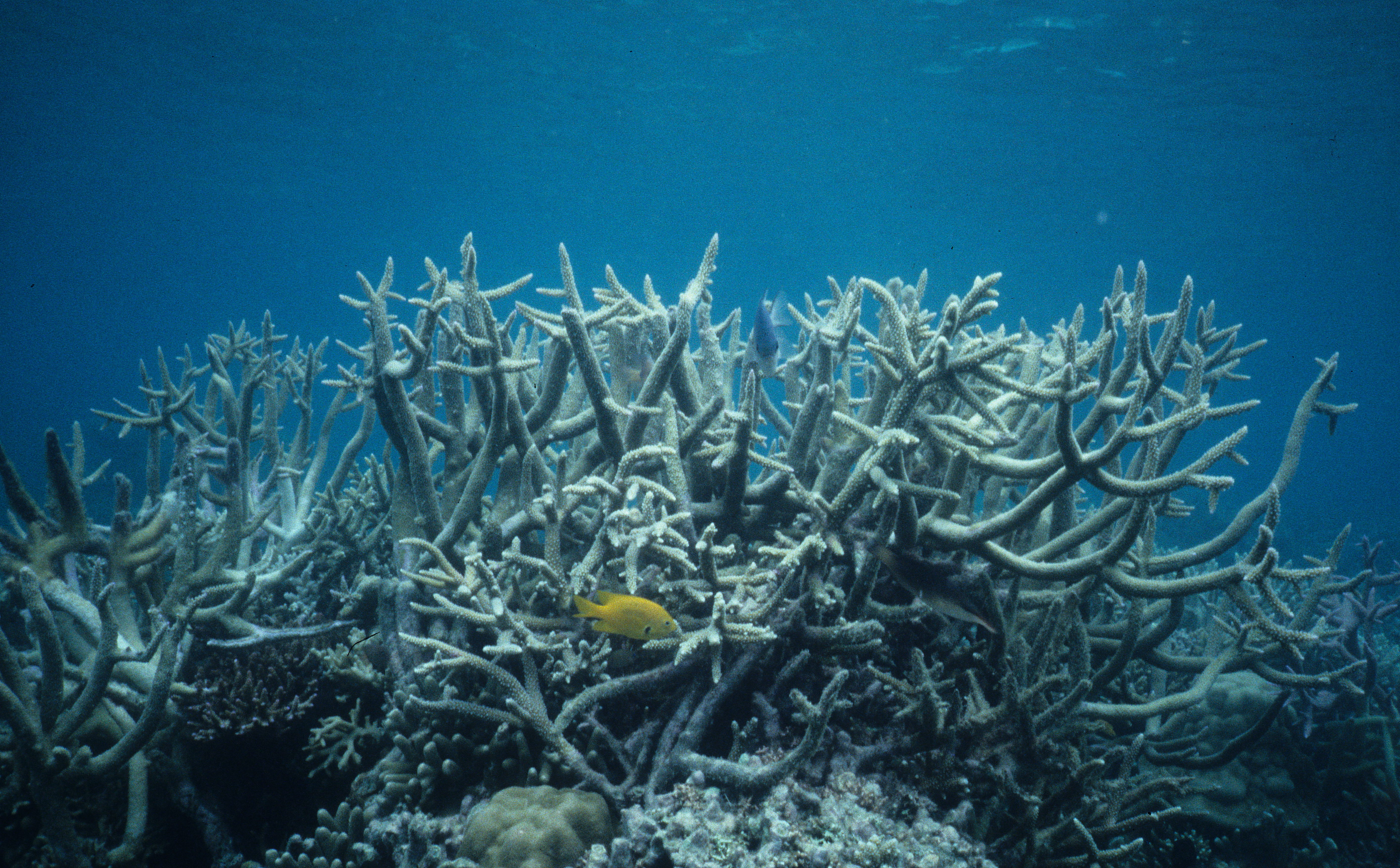
- Corals in the lagoon at Dravuni Island

- Location in Fiji
- Coordinates: 18°46′S 178°32′E
- Country: Fiji
- Island group: Kadavu Group
- Division: Eastern Division
- Province: Kadavu
- District: Nakasalela

Area
  - Total: 0.8 km^{2} (0.31 sq mi)
- Elevation: 40 m (130 ft)

Population
  - Total: 125
  - Density: 160/km^{2} (400/sq mi)

Dravuni (pronounced [ndraˈβuni]) is a volcanic island in the Kadavu Group of islands in Fiji. Covering an area of 0.8 km^{2} (0.3 sq mi) , it is located at 18.78° South and 178.53° East, and reaches a maximum altitude of 40 metres (131 ft) .

The island is inhabited by approximately 125 people and is the most northern of several inhabited islands within the Great Astrolabe Reef.

Just north of the Astrolabe lies Solo Reef, an atoll where according to local legend there used to be a village that sunk into the sea. Villagers who fish there respect this legendary village by not throwing garbage overboard.

Dravuni is also home to The University of the South Pacific (USP) research facility which is currently being used by Coral Cay Conservation as the main base for conducting surveys on the reefs by invitation of the Fijian Ministry of Tourism.

The former Foreign Minister and diplomat Kaliopate Tavola is a native of Dravuni.
