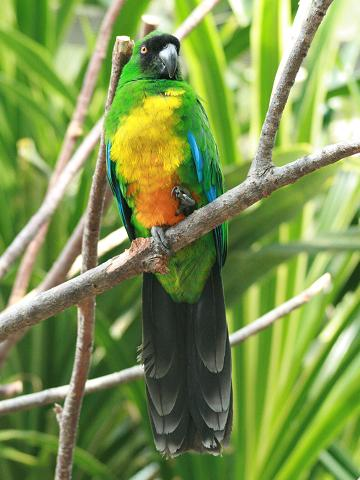

Conservation status
- Near Threatened (IUCN 3.1)

Scientific classification
- Kingdom: Animalia
- Phylum: Chordata
- Class: Aves
- Order: Psittaciformes
- Family: Psittaculidae
- Genus: Prosopeia
- Species: P. personata

Binomial name
- Prosopeia personata (Gray, GR, 1848)

Synonyms
- Caracopsis personata (protonym)

= Masked shining parrot =

Species of bird

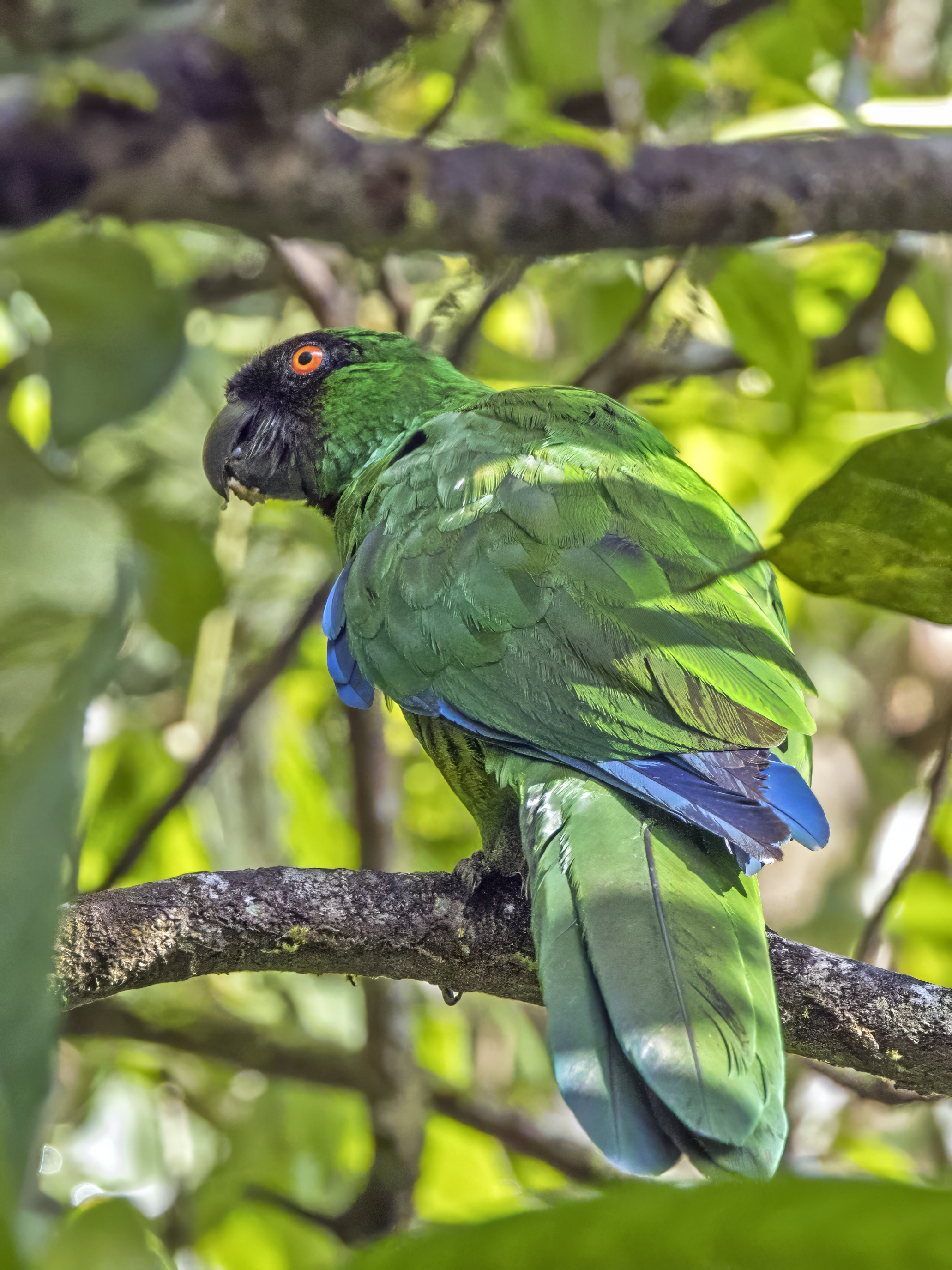
showing back feathers

The masked shining parrot (Prosopeia personata), also known as the masked parrot, masked musk parrot, or the yellow-breasted musk parrot is a species of parrot in the family Psittaculidae. It is endemic to Viti Levu in Fiji. Its natural habitats are subtropical or tropical moist lowland forest, subtropical or tropical mangrove forest, subtropical or tropical moist montane forest, arable land, and rural gardens. It is threatened by habitat loss.

== Description ==
It is 47 cm long and weighs 322 g. It has a black mask on its face, and has a mainly bright green body. The center of its breast is yellow, turning into orange towards the abdomen. The outer webs of the primary feathers on the wing are blue or purple. Its tail feathers are green, and washed with blue.
