= Berlin-Dahlem Museum Centre =

Museum

Coordinates: 52°27′21″N 13°17′32″E

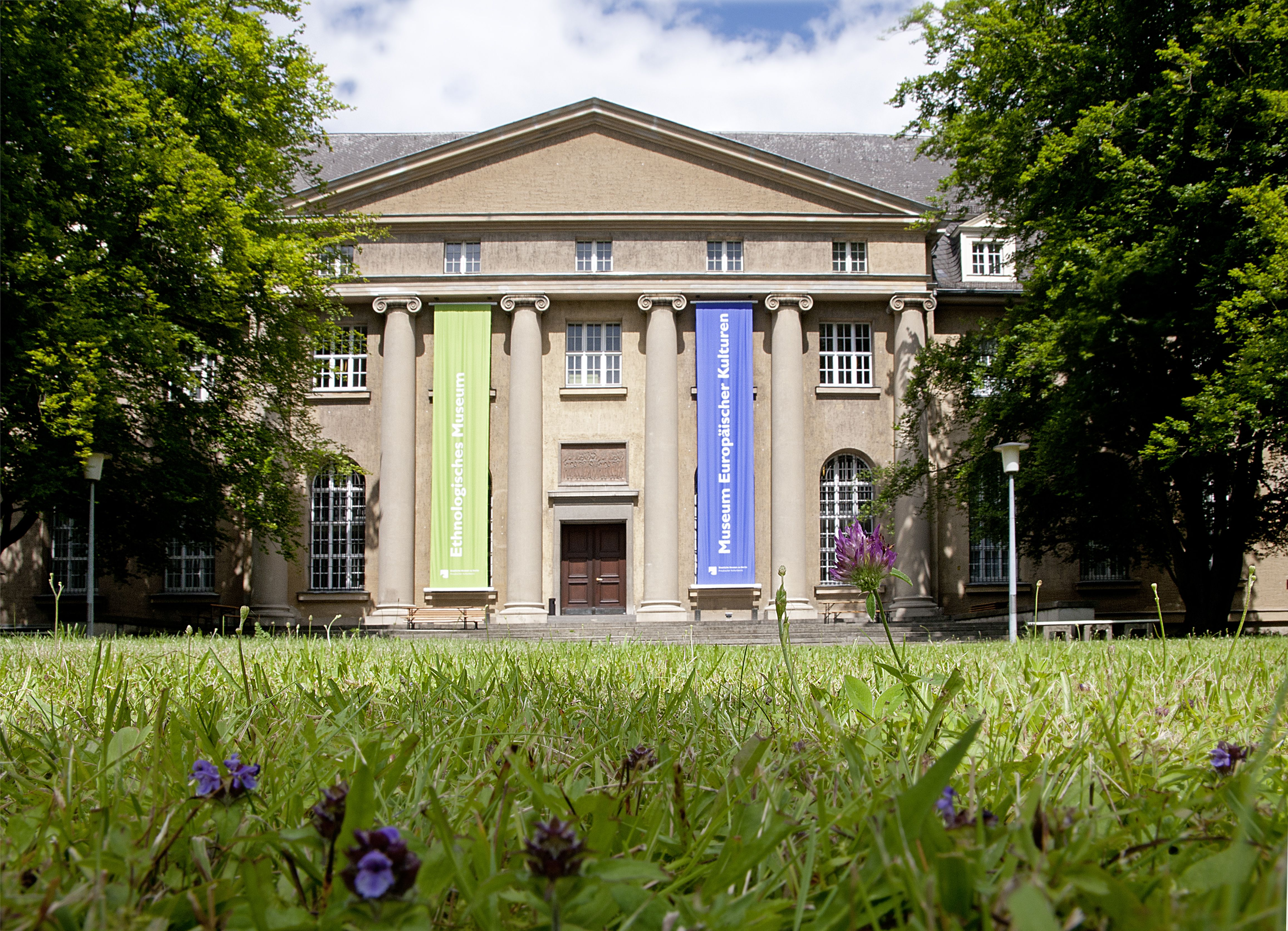
Main entrance to the Museum of European Culture, 2011

Dahlem Museums (Museen Dahlem) is a complex in the Berlin-Dahlem district of Berlin. Its official address is at 8 Lansstraße, though its main entrance is at 25 Arnimallee. The earliest planning for the building was between 1914 and 1923, thanks to the efforts of Wilhelm von Bode and to designs by Bruno Paul. However, it was only eventually built between 1969 and 1973 to New Objectivity plans by Fritz Bornemann and Wils Ebert.

It originally housed the Ethnological Museum (including what later became the Museum of Asian Art) and the Gemäldegalerie. The Gemäldegalerie moved out to new premises in June 1998 and the Museum Europäischer Kulturen moved into the building in 2011. The Dahlem galleries housing the Ethnological Museum and Museum for Asian Art both closed in January 2017 ready to re-open in 2019 in the Humboldt Forum.
