= Epineri Vula =

Fijian lawyer and politician

Member of the Senate
- In office 1982–1987

Personal details
- Died: 27 April 1988; Suva, Fiji

Epineri Vula (died 27 April 1988) was a Fijian lawyer and politician. He served as a member of the Senate from 1982 to 1987, and as a Supreme Court justice from 1987 until his death the following year.

== Biography ==
Vula attended the Victoria University of Wellington, graduating in 1964. He subsequently worked as a lawyer.

In 1982 he was appointed to the Senate as one of the nominees of the Great Council of Chiefs. Following the 1987 coup he was appointed as a judge in the Supreme Court. He died in the Colonial War Memorial Hospital in Suva in April 1988.
