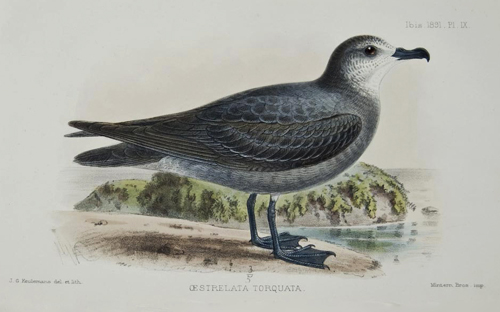

Conservation status
- Vulnerable (IUCN 3.1)

Scientific classification
- Kingdom: Animalia
- Phylum: Chordata
- Class: Aves
- Order: Procellariiformes
- Family: Procellariidae
- Genus: Pterodroma
- Species: P. brevipes

Binomial name
- Pterodroma brevipes (Peale, 1849)

= Collared petrel =

Species of bird

The collared petrel (Pterodroma brevipes) is a species of seabird in the family Procellariidae. It is sometimes regarded as a subspecies of Gould's petrel (P. leucoptera).

Its breeding range is uncertain and it is currently known to breed only in Fiji where it occurs on Gau and possibly other islands. It formerly bred in the Cook Islands and may still breed in Vanuatu and the Solomon Islands. It is an unconfirmed breeder in Samoa, American Samoa and French Polynesia.

It nests on steep, forested slopes in a burrow or among tree roots. It feeds in open seas and some disperse into the central Pacific outside the breeding season.

The population from Vanuatu was considered to be a new subspecies Pterodroma brevipes magnificens in 2010.

The species is thought to vagrate poleward in response to warmer-than-average sea surface temperatures, suggesting that it may be expanding its foraging range in response to global warming.
