= Great Astrolabe Reef =

Reef in Fiji

Coordinates: 18.8619°S 178.4984°E

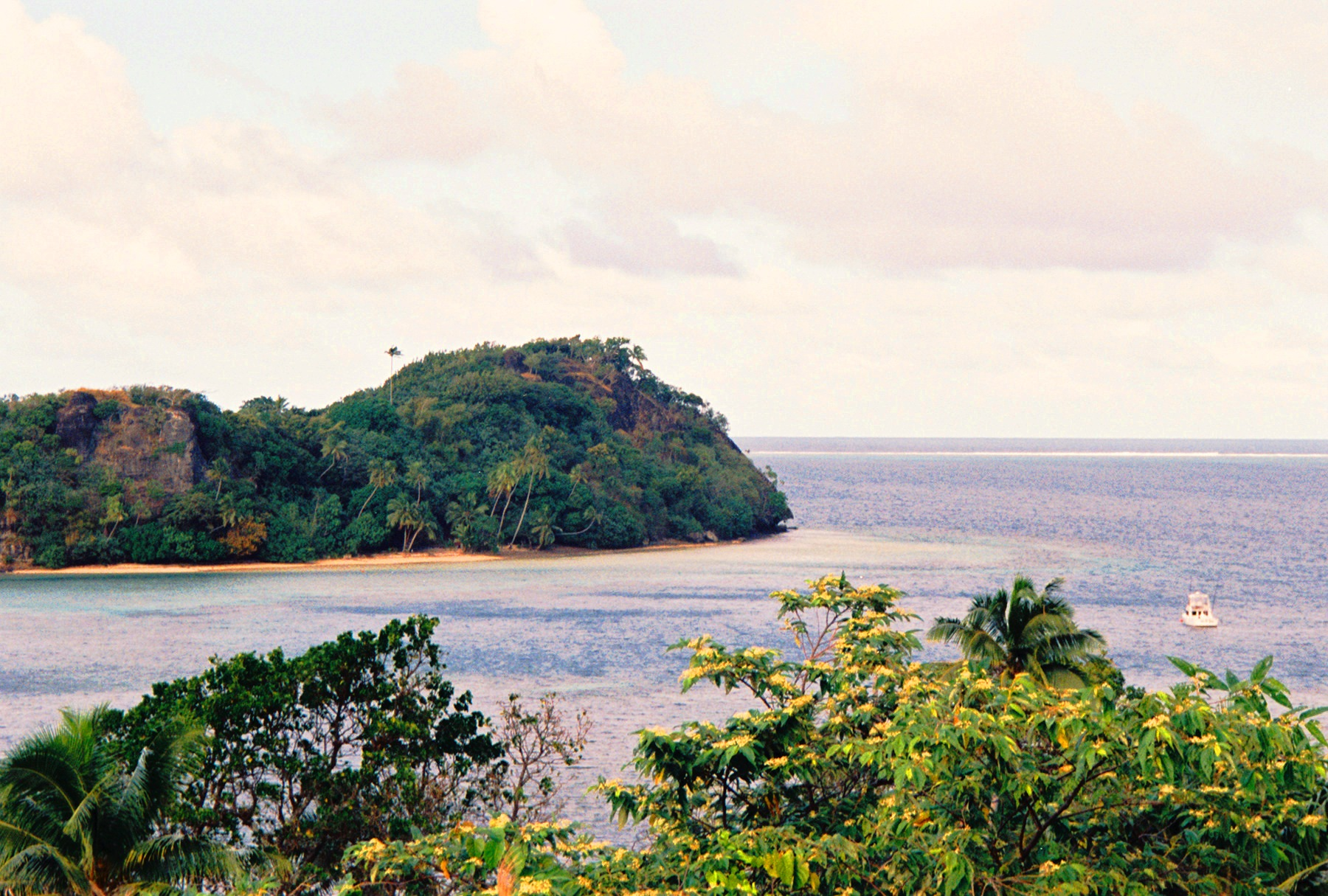
Great Astrolabe Reef

The Great Astrolabe Reef is in Fiji and surrounds the fourth largest island, Kadavu Island, which is approximately 65 km in length. Kadavu Island is approximately 100 km south of Viti Levu, the main island of Fiji.

The Great Astrolabe Reef is one of the largest barrier reefs in the world and encompasses Kadavu Island, Ono Island and other small islands within a natural protective lagoon. The reef is predominantly located along the southern coast of Kadavu Island and arcs north around Ono Island and further north to Buliya.

The reef is a breeding ground for many large billfish (marlin) species, sharks, tuna, giant trevally, mahi-mahi (dolphinfish) and snapper, due to it having many channels leading from extremely deep water into shallow lagoons. Parts of the reef, such as Naiqoro Passage, one of the main passages, are protected from fishing and require entry fees. This is because Naiqoro Passage is one of the main thoroughfares for large fish.

The marine lagoon ecosystem of the reef contributes to its national significance as outlined in Fiji's Biodiversity Strategy and Action Plan.

== Naming ==
The reef was named after the French exploring ship Astrolabe, the Astrolabe Reef in New Zealand is named after the same ship.

== Tourism ==
The reef is a great location for experiencing marine life and coral diversity, being relatively unspoilt due to its distance from dense population. Buliya is famous for its manta ray snorkelling and is a highlight of travelling to Kadavu Island and Ono Island.

The water temperature varies from 25 to 32 degrees Celsius, making it ideal for snorkelling and scuba diving. The average visibility underwater is 25 metres, with visibility increasing to up to 40 metres on clear, windless days.

Resorts on Kadavu Island and Ono Island offer accommodation with direct access to snorkelling and diving.
