= Ono Island (Fiji) =

Island in the Kadavu Group, Fiji

Coordinates: 18°54′S 178°29′E

Ono
- Location within Fiji

Geography
- Location: South Pacific Ocean
- Archipelago: Kadavu Group
- Area: 30 km^{2} (12 sq mi)
- Highest elevation: 354 m (1161 ft)

Administration
- Fiji
- Division: Eastern Division
- Province: Kadavu
- District: Nakasaleka

Ono Island is a member of the Kadavu Group, an outlier of Kadavu Island, to the south of Viti Levu, one of Fiji's two main islands. It is separated from Kadavu Island by the Ono Channel. Located at 18.88° South and 178.50° East, this volcanic island is enclosed by the Great Astrolabe Reef and covers an area of 30 square kilometres (12 sq mi). Its maximum altitude is 354 metres (1,161 ft). There are seven villages: Vabea (south), Waisomo (south), Narikoso (southeast), Naqara (northeast), Nabouwalu (northwest), Buliya, and Dravuni.

== History ==
A massacre occurred there on September 8, 1836, aboard the US Brigg Charles Daggett on a return visit to the sea slug drying station set up there in 1831 by Captain Driver on the ship Clay from Salem, Massachusetts. The Charles Dagget (Doggett) returned to Vabea under the command of Captain Batchelor (sic. Bachelor), Chief Officer Charles Shipman, and a crew of 25 to collect sea slugs (Beach le Mar). The chief Ro Veidovi, whose parents were Roko Tabiawalu, chief of Rewa and mother was the daughter of the paramount chief of Tavuki, was part of the group of natives involved. The names of those killed were Charles Shipman, 1st officer, Benjamin Barton, trading master, John Clark, seaman, William Wall, seaman, John Evans, seaman, Eggbert Smith, seaman; a black, name unknown; a boy, name unknown, and two Tahiti men, and five persons wounded – total 10 killed and 5 wounded, out of the crew of 25 persons. As the result of the death of the first officer, Charles Shipman Payson, a full court of inquiry into this event was held upon their return to the US. The US Navy trial was inconclusive and included an open warrant to return anyone involved in the event to the United States for questioning in the sailing orders of the US Exploring Expedition that left for a voyage around the world from Newport News, Virginia, on August 18, 1838, and returning on June 10, 1842. The result was that when the US Exploring Expedition visited Rewa in 1841, Ro Vendovi was captured and taken to the United States to be questioned in the affair. Vendovi survived the trip around the world from Fiji to the Brooklyn, New York Navy Hospital, where he died a few hours after arriving. The samples, plants, and artwork collected during the expedition became the start of the Smithsonian Institution. Vendovi's personal effects, skull, and mandible (ascension #242) are part of the Anthropology Department collection.

Ono is known for its ancient method of fermenting breadfruit, plantains, and dalo underground. The food is stored in a hole in the ground, sometimes for several years, in preparation for future emergencies. The primary sector dominates the economy; a reforestation program, replanting the island with pine seedlings, is in progress.
