= Kadavu Group =

Archipelago in Fiji

Coordinates: 19.0333°S 178.567°E

The Kadavu Group is an archipelago south of Viti Levu, one of Fiji's two main islands. Dominated by Kadavu Island, the fourth largest island in Fiji, the group also includes Ono, Dravuni, Galoa and a number of islets in the Great Astrolabe Reef. The population as of the 2017 census was 10,869.
