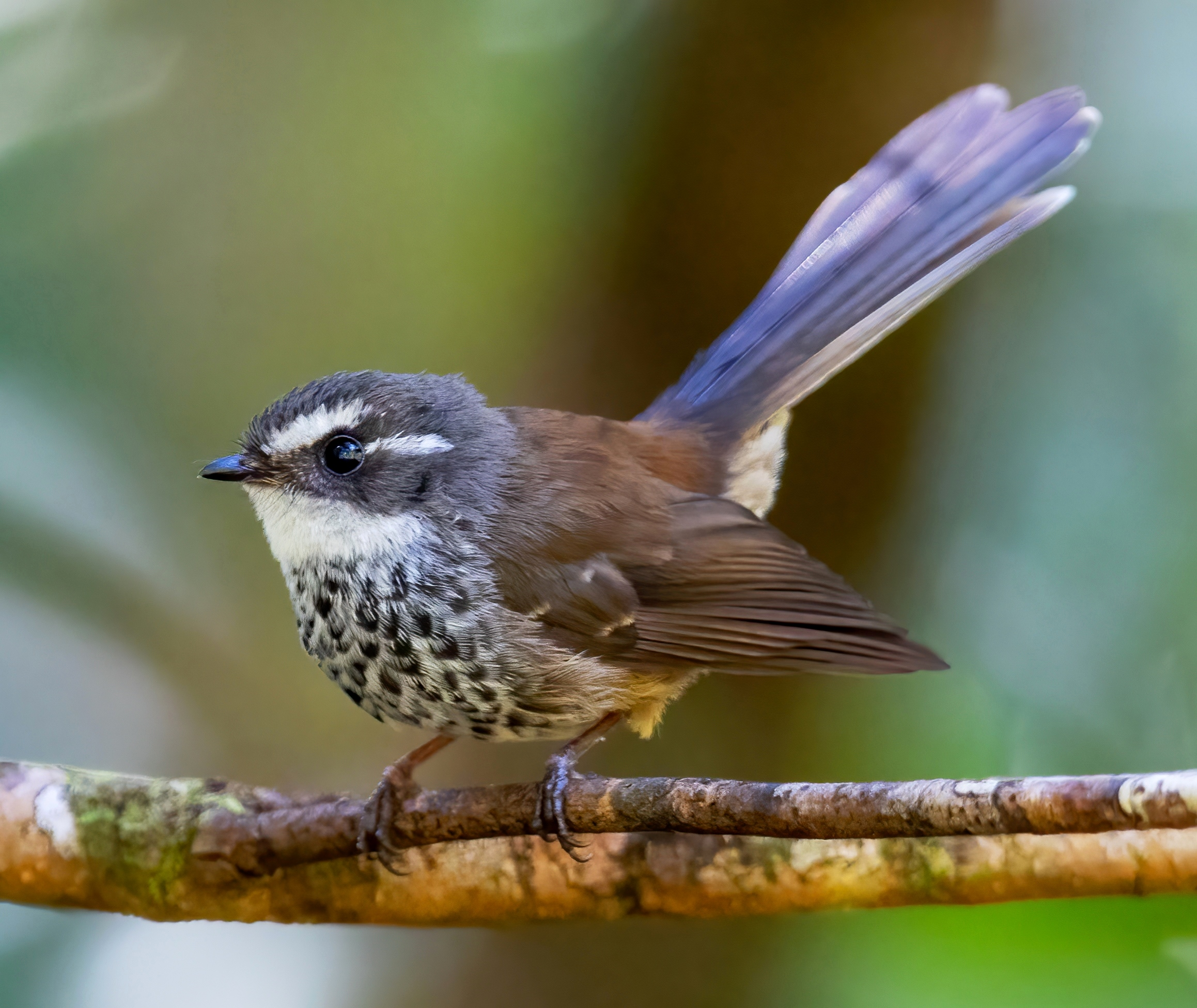
- A juvenile bird in the Blue River Provincial Park of southern New Caledonia

Conservation status
- Least Concern (IUCN 3.1)

Scientific classification
- Kingdom: Animalia
- Phylum: Chordata
- Class: Aves
- Order: Passeriformes
- Family: Rhipiduridae
- Genus: Rhipidura
- Species: R. verreauxi

Binomial name
- Rhipidura verreauxi E. Marié, 1870

= New Caledonian streaked fantail =

Species of bird

The New Caledonian streaked fantail (Rhipidura verreauxi) is a species of bird in the family Rhipiduridae. It is endemic to New Caledonia, and the Loyalty Islands (but not Ouvéa Island). Its natural habitats are subtropical or tropical moist lowland forests and subtropical or tropical moist montane forests. It was formerly considered as conspecific with the Vanuatu streaked fantail and the Fiji streaked fantail with the English name "streaked fantail".

== Taxonomy ==
The New Caledonian streaked fantail was formally described in 1870 by the French naturalist Édouard Auguste Marié under the binomial name Rhipidura verreauxi based on a specimen collected in New Caledonia. The specific epithet was chosen to honour the French naturalist Jules Verreaux. The species is monotypic: no subspecies are recognised. The Vanuatu streaked fantail (Rhipidura spilodera) and the Fiji streaked fantail (Rhipidura layardi) were formerly treated as subspecies.
