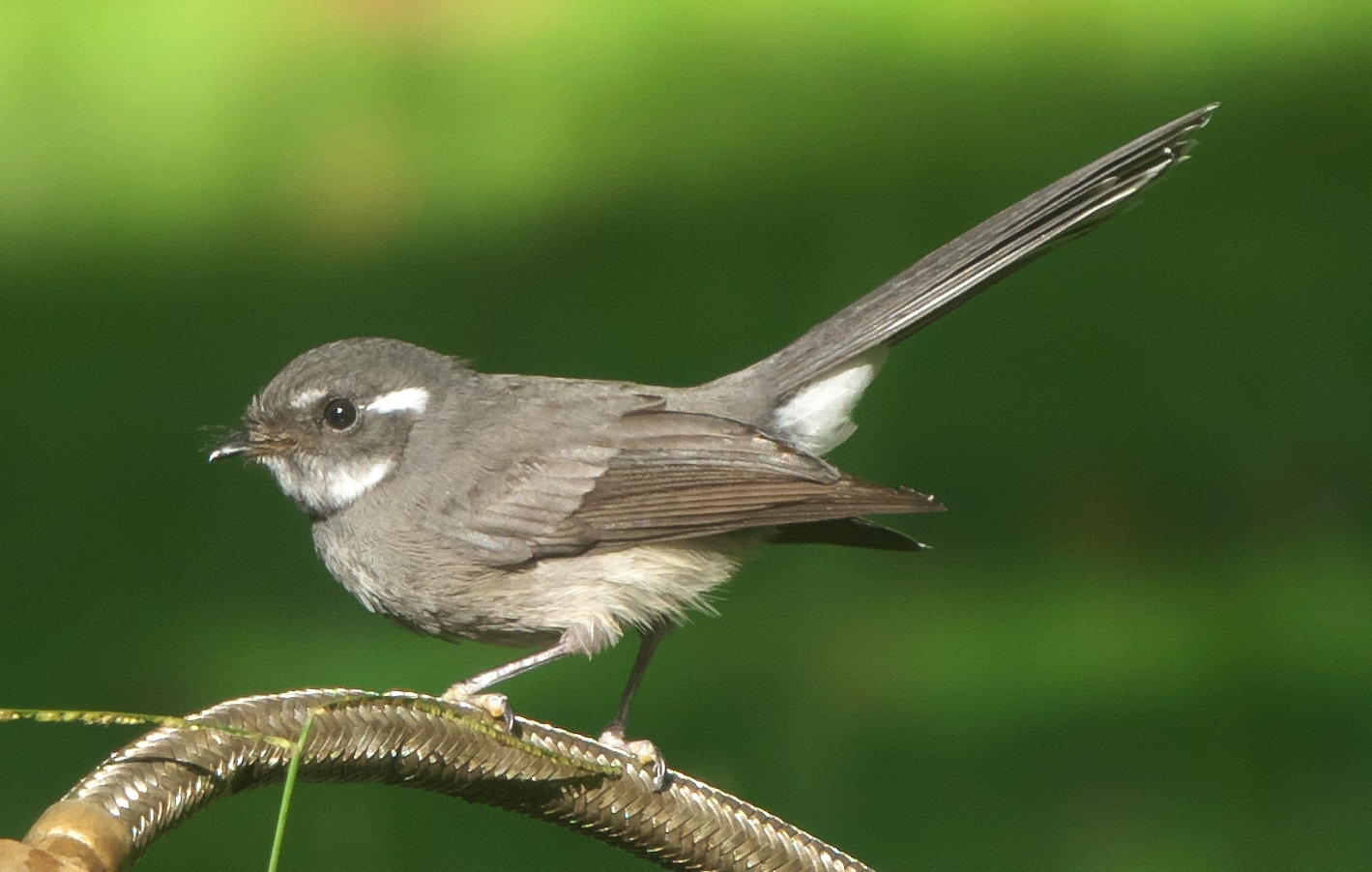
- subspecies altera

Conservation status
- Least Concern (IUCN 3.1)

Scientific classification
- Kingdom: Animalia
- Phylum: Chordata
- Class: Aves
- Order: Passeriformes
- Family: Rhipiduridae
- Genus: Rhipidura
- Species: R. nebulosa

Binomial name
- Rhipidura nebulosa Peale, 1849
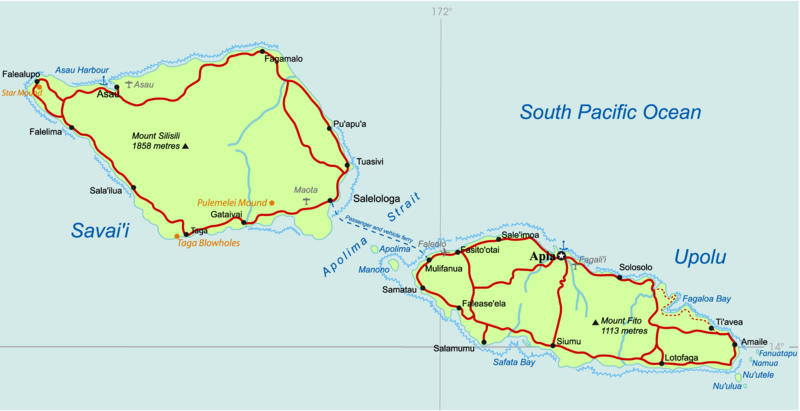

= Samoan fantail =

Species of bird

The Samoan fantail (Rhipidura nebulosa) (Seʻu) is a species of bird in the family Rhipiduridae. It is endemic to Samoa and is found in Upolu and Savaiʻi islands.

== Taxonomy ==
The samoan fantail was formally described in 1848 or 1849 by American naturalist Titian Peale in volume VIII of the report of the United States Exploring Expedition. He placed it with other fantails in the genus Rhipidura and coined the binomial name Rhipidura nebulosa. He based his description on samples and observations taken during the expedition.

There are 2 recognised subspecies of this fantail, although some authorities believe that that they may be better treated as a single race.

- R. n. altera Mayr, 1931
- R. n. nebulosa Peale, 1849

== Description ==
Samoan fantails reach an average length of 13–15.5 cm (5.1–6.1 in) and an average weight of 4.5–7 g (0.16–0.25 oz). Like other fantails, they are small black-and-white birds, with an almost completely sooty-grey colouration. In the nominate subspecies, the only pale portions of the body are the white spot behind the ear-coverts, the white vent, and the light buff stomach. The subspecies altera has more extensive white/buff on the belly and face, while some birds of that subspecies may also have white throats. They are not as noisy as the New Zealand fantail, with a calls that sound like "chur" and "zweet!".

== Distribution and habitat ==
As the name suggests, the Samoan fantail is endemic to the Samoan archipelago, where it is found on the islands of Upolu and Savaiʻi. It is a common species of rainforests, undergrowth, and more disturbed habitats such as plantations and gardens on Upolu, where it is found at all elevations from the lowlands up to montane forests at elevations of 900 m (3,000 ft) above sea level. It is more uncommon on Savaiʻi, where it is found in primary forests at elevations of 300–600 m (980–1,970 ft) above sea level.
