= Bougainville fantail =

Conservation status
- Least Concern (IUCN 3.1)

Scientific classification
- Kingdom: Animalia
- Phylum: Chordata
- Class: Aves
- Order: Passeriformes
- Family: Rhipiduridae
- Genus: Rhipidura
- Species: R. drownei

Binomial name
- Rhipidura drownei Mayr, 1931
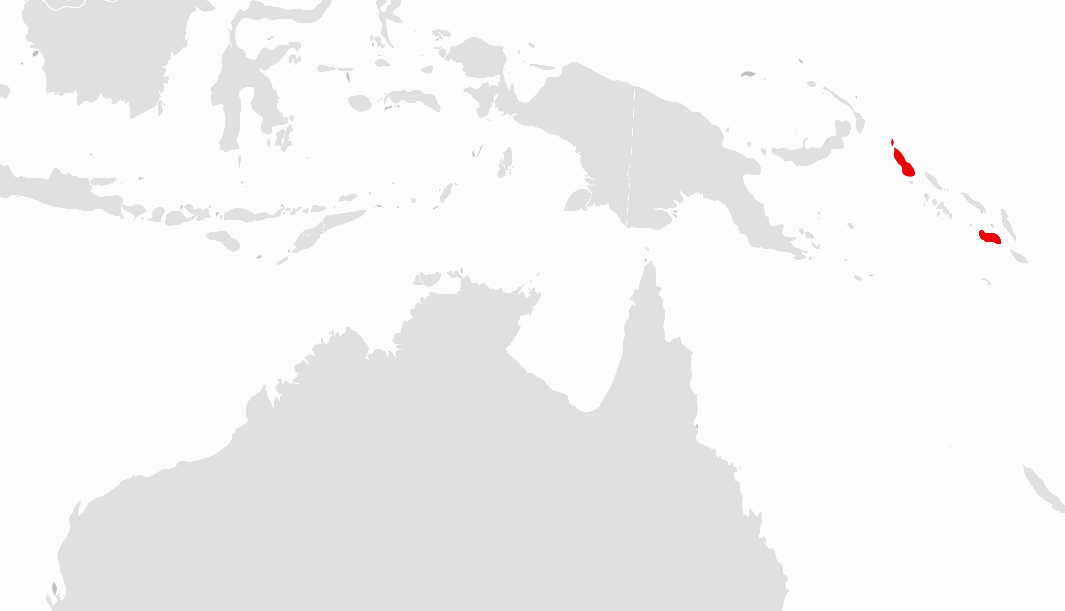

Species of bird

The Bougainville fantail (Rhipidura drownei), formerly the brown fantail, is a species of bird in the family Rhipiduridae. It is endemic of Bougainville Island in the Solomon Islands. It was formerly considered to be conspecific with the Guadalcanal fantail.

== Description ==
It is a small bird from 9-10 up to 14 cm long) dark bird with a long tail, which it often spreads like a fan. The main color of the plumage is brown, which is reflected in the former English name of this species. Upperparts - greyish-brown, underparts somewhat lighter, gray with an ocher tint and a faint white streak. The wings are brown above, the tail is light brown. The chest and head are greyish. On the head above the eye - a white stripe - "eyebrow" Sometimes there is also a light strip under the eye. Iris is dark brown. The beak is black or greyish brown, with a paler base underneath. The neck is whitish-gray. Legs are brownish gray. Males and females are rather similar, but females are somewhat smaller. Juveniles are also similar to adults, but their plumage is duller and lacks the white markings on the head and throat; the rufous color on the wings and tail is paler.

The voice is like a weak but piercing ringing whistle.

== Distribution and habitat ==
The Bougainville fantail inhabits mountain forests at an altitude of more than 700 meters above sea level (adults are usually above 900 m) and at least up to 1600 m..

== Behaviour ==
=== Food and feeding ===
It feeds on all tiers of the forest, catching insects on the fly or looking them out from the foliage. It may join mixed-species flocks for foraging.

=== Breeding ===
The nest is small cup-shaped with a very small hanging tail. All the construction is entwined with cobwebs. It is built at a height of about 2 m above the ground in a fork of a horizontal branch.
