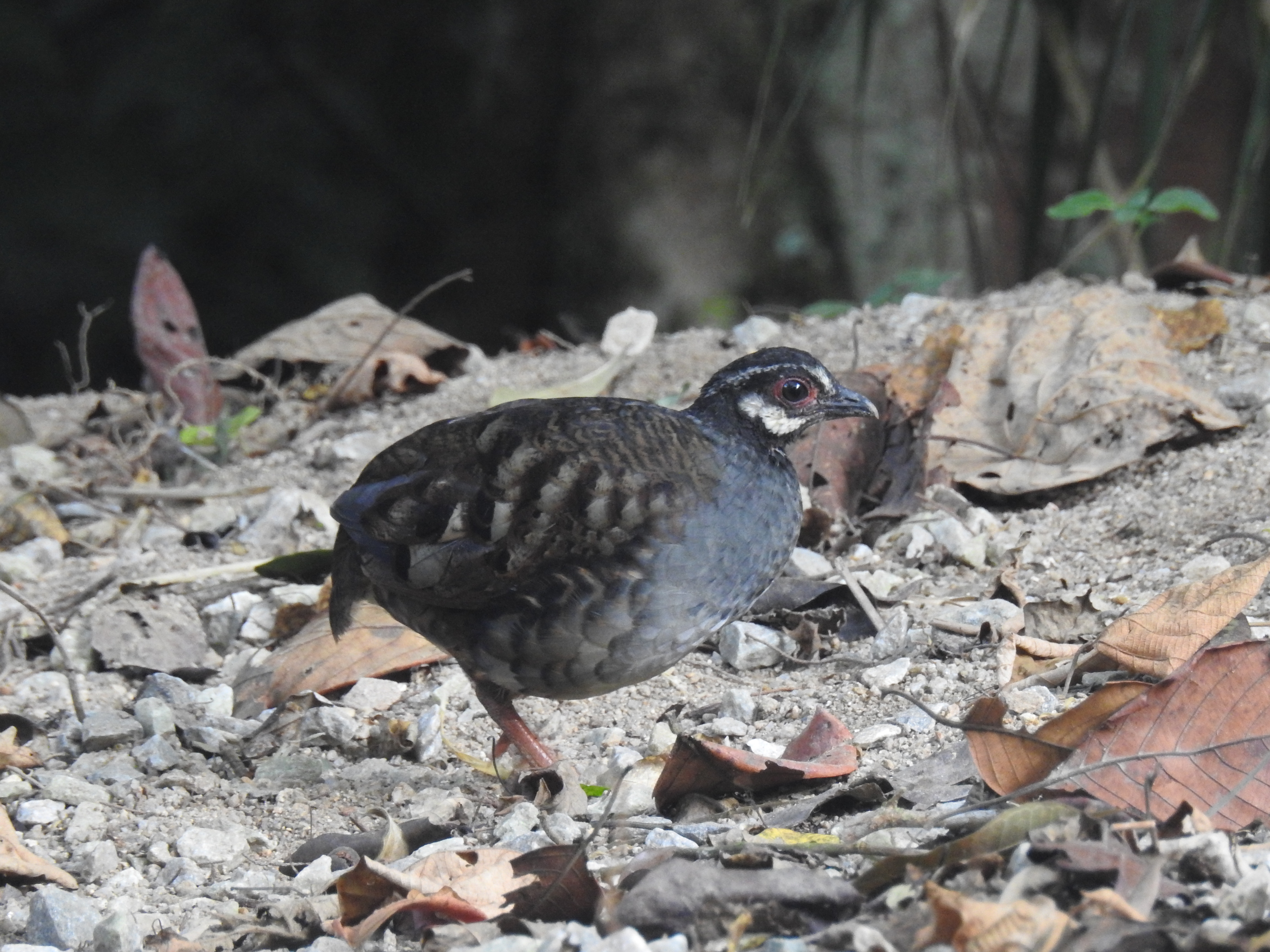

Conservation status
- Least Concern (IUCN 3.1)

Scientific classification
- Kingdom: Animalia
- Phylum: Chordata
- Class: Aves
- Order: Galliformes
- Family: Phasianidae
- Genus: Arborophila
- Species: A. campbelli

Binomial name
- Arborophila campbelli (Robinson, 1904)
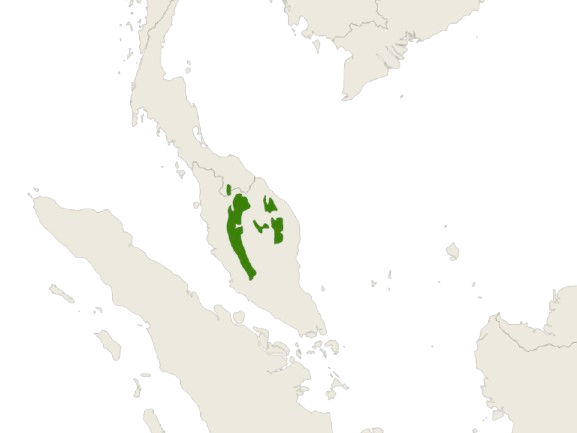

Synonyms
- Arborophila orientalis campbelli

= Malaysian partridge =

Species of bird

The Malaysian partridge (Arborophila campbelli), also known as the Malayan partridge, Malay partridge, Malay hill partridge or Campbell's partridge, is a bird species in the family Phasianidae. It is occasionally classified as a subspecies of the gray-breasted partridge, although most sources classify it as a separate monotypic species. It is relatively reclusive, and is found throughout highland forest habitats in Peninsular Malaysia. This bird primarily inhabits developed forests containing lush undergrowth, and is known to feed on fruits of rattan palms and the creeping plant Pratia begoniaefolia, along with termites and gastropods. It exhibits mottled brown, black, gray and beige coloring, with distinctive white auricular patches. Despite its decreasing population, the Malaysian partridge is relatively unsusceptible to threats such as habitat loss, as its range largely consists of protected areas. Therefore, the International Union for Conservation of Nature has assessed it as "Least Concern."

== Description ==
This bird is characterized by its mottled olive brown coloration and gray breast. The head is black with white bands, and the eyes are surrounded by red coloration. The legs are often varying shades of red. Most adults measure to about 28 centimeters (11 inches) in length. Females are slightly smaller and possess duller coloration on the head and legs. Juveniles usually possess rufous coloration, with some barring on the breast.

== Taxonomy ==
The Malaysian partridge was initially described by British zoologist and ornithologist Herbert Christopher Robinson in 1904, during an expedition to the Malay peninsula. His classification of this bird in the genus Arborophila stands to this day, although it has often been taxonomized as a subspecies of the gray-breasted partridge (Arborophila orientalis). Arborophila rolli, A. sumatrana, A. javanica and A. brunneopectus were also previously labeled as conspecific with A. campbelli and A. orientalis. This species is monotypic, and therefore consists of no further subspecies.

== Distribution and habitat ==
This partridge is found in certain areas of the Malay Peninsula. It is known to reside in the countries of Malaysia and Thailand, and vagrancy has not been reported. Migratory behaviors have not been reported, and this bird is presumed sedentary. It primarily resides in montane forests containing dense undergrowth, often occurring in the upper dipterocarp zone at around 1000–1600 meters (3,280–5,250 ft) in elevation.

== Behavior ==
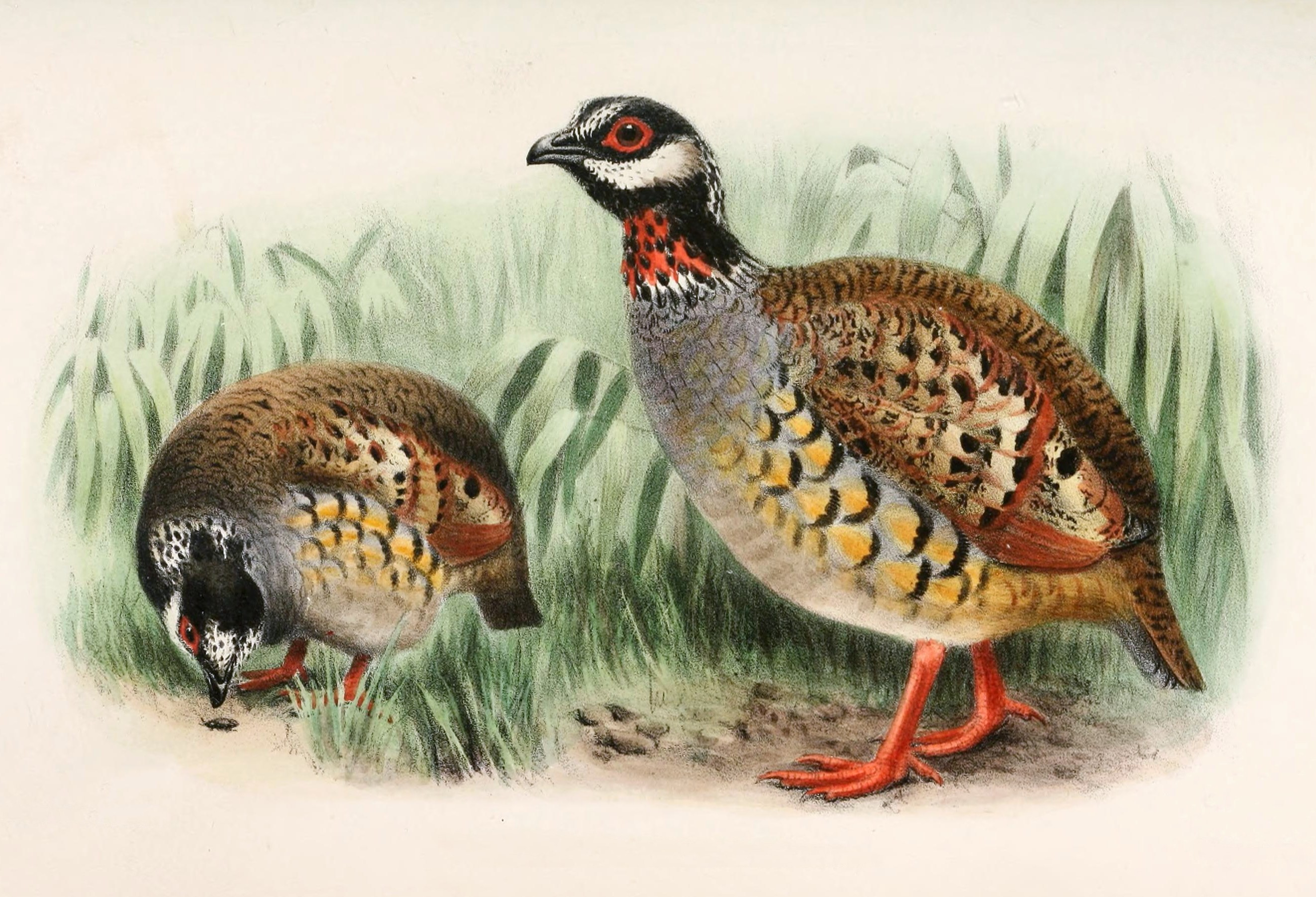
Malaysian partridges feeding. Herbert Goodchild, 1905.

The Malaysian partridge is relatively elusive, and as a result there is limited information regarding its behavioral qualities. However, it is known to forage on fruits of rattan palms and of the creeping plant Pratia begoniaefolia, along with termites and gastropods. It is gregarious, and is often found foraging in pairs or small groups. Based on data collected and the habits of other birds in the genus Arborophila, it is highly likely that this bird is diurnal. Calls are a series of ringing whistles which transition into shorter series of around 12 disyllabic notes. The second call takes the form of a more abrupt "chip, chip" sound. These calls may be heard year round. When disturbed, it exhibits a weak but rapidly repeated "wit-wut" call. This partridge is sedentary, and there have been no recorded instances of migration or vagrancy.

Few reports of this bird's breeding behavior have been released, and the breeding season is unspecified. However, eggs have been found at around the month of May. These eggs measure at around 42 mm x 31.5–32 mm (1.7 x 1.3 in) in size, and exhibit plain white coloration. Eggs have primarily been observed in clutches of four. Few nests have been observed, and those that have been recorded were primarily flat and loose woven pads measuring at around 15 cm (6 in) across. These nests consisted of twigs and leaves, and one observation documented a nest containing a tunnel leading into a deep pad of leaves. There has been no documented information on incubation or fledgelings.

== Status ==
Despite its limited range, this bird is assessed by the IUCN red list as "Least Concern." This is due to the fact that its range primarily consists of protected areas and conditions which are difficult to reach. Therefore, it is largely unsusceptible to threats such as habitat loss and poaching. However, several local conservation organizations such as the Thai Office of Natural Resources and Environmental Policy and Planning (ONEP) and Bird Conservation Society of Thailand (BCST) classify this bird as "Vulnerable." As of 2024, its population has been assessed as declining, although the population size is listed as unknown. Despite this, the population is projected as sparsely distributed.
