= John T. Cockerell =

John Thomas Cockerell (November 1819 – 25 September 1907) was an English collector of specimens for zoölogists, active in Australia sometime between 1865 and 1891.

Cockerell was born in 1819 in England, the illegitimate son of Thomas Atkinson, a wealthy gentleman from Hampshire, and Sarah Jane Cockerell. Atkinson, who had also fathered a child out of wedlock with another woman the previous year, was sued for divorce by his wife, Elizabeth Carter Atkinson, on grounds of cruelty and adultry. Cockerell was baptised as John Thomas Atkinson in July 1820 in London, with his mother using the alias Stella.

In reviewing an outlying record of Purpureicephalus spurius (red-capped parrot) at Port Essington, repeated by John Gould and other ornithologists, Birds of Australia gave this caution on Cockerell's specimens.

I have repeatedly indicated the falsity of the Cockerell localities, as had been pointed out by Sharpe previously, and consequently this record is apparently just as false. I wrote: "The wickedness of the Cockerell labelling mostly irritates in the fact that Cockerell was a splendid collector and made beautiful bird skins and secured so many rarities, so that it is always possible that some of his novelties were really novel, but owing to his action no reliance can be placed upon any of his records." — Birds of Australia, 1917.

The Handbook of the Birds of the World Alive 'Key to Scientific Names' notes possible biographical details, placing him in Hong Kong 1847 in a government position, commissariat storekeeper, also a soldier of fortune, seafarer and naturalist, who settled in Queensland about 1860.

He died in Lismore, New South Wales in 1907. His son, James F. Cockerell (1847–1897), followed in his father's occupation.
