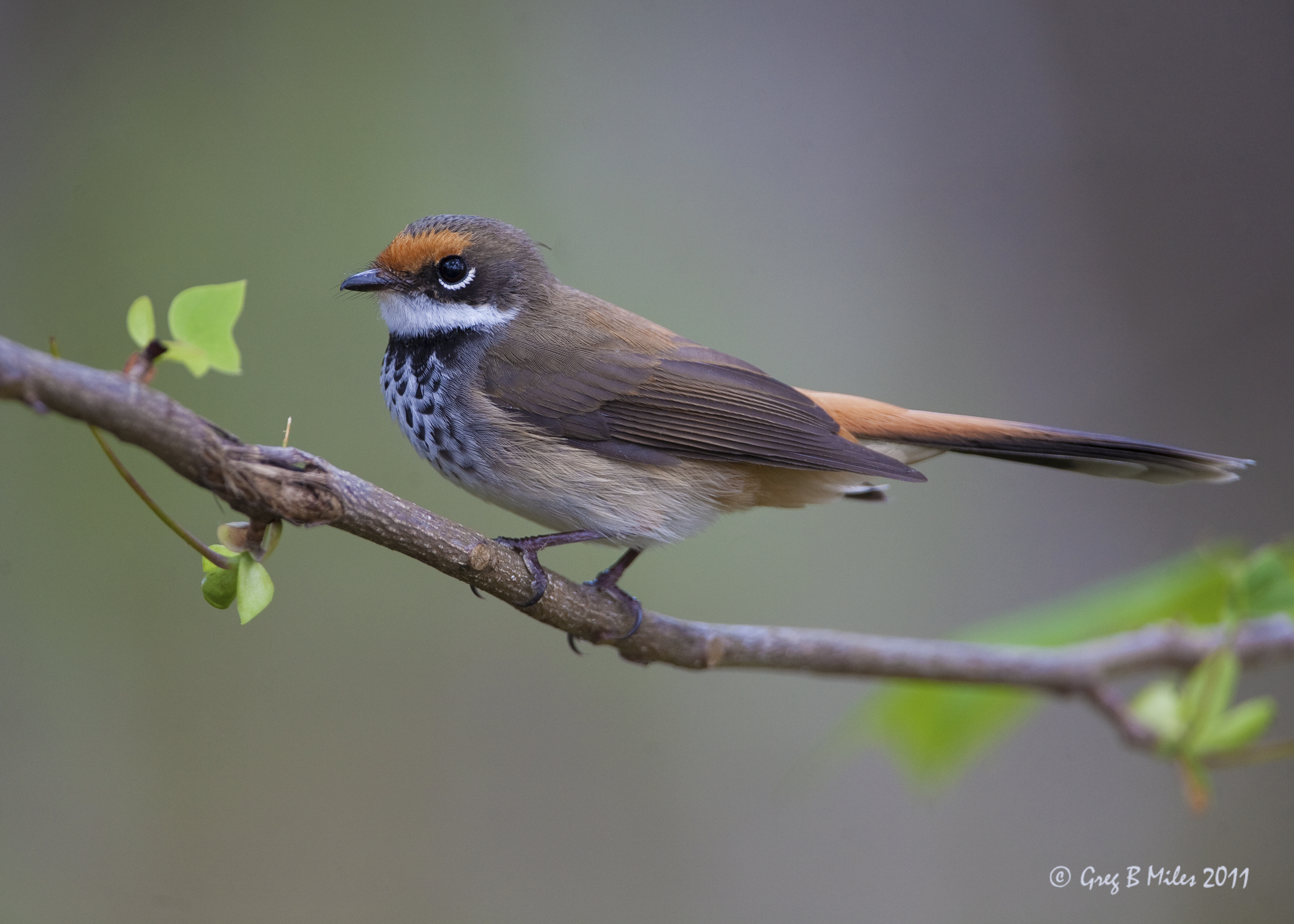
- Adult

Conservation status
- Least Concern (IUCN 3.1)

Scientific classification
- Kingdom: Animalia
- Phylum: Chordata
- Class: Aves
- Order: Passeriformes
- Family: Rhipiduridae
- Genus: Rhipidura
- Species: R. rufifrons

Binomial name
- Rhipidura rufifrons (Latham, 1801)

= Australian rufous fantail =

Species of bird

The Australian rufous fantail (Rhipidura rufifrons) is a small passerine bird, most commonly known also as the black-breasted rufous-fantail or rufous-fronted fantail, which can be found in Australia.

Characteristic of species that have a large range, the Australian rufous fantail has many subspecies. However the taxonomic treatment of its subspecies and other relatives is still debated. The Australian rufous fantail is easily distinguished by their orange-reddish-brown back, rump and base of tail. They have a black and white breast that grades into a white colour on the chin and throat.

They are migratory, travelling to south-eastern Australia in the spring to breed, and then north in the autumn.

The Australian rufous fantail tends to feed on small insects in the lower parts of the canopy. They are very active birds making short, frequent flights. They may also hop between foliage or on the ground, during foraging.

Although their population is thought to be declining, their relatively large range and abundance make them a species of least concern according to the IUCN.

== Taxonomy ==
The Australian rufous fantail has complex evolutionary relationships and sometimes this results in conflicting taxonomy. This is not uncommon since taxonomies are merely hypotheses of a species' evolutionary status. Debate is still currently ongoing about the taxonomic treatment of the Australian rufous fantail's subspecies and its related species.

=== History of naming ===
The Australian rufous fantail was first described by Latham in his 1801 work, Index Ornithologicus initially as Muscicapa rufifrons. It was later reclassified into the genus Rhipidura by Vigors and Horsfield. The Australian rufous fantail's scientific name is consequently Rhipidura rufifrons. Rhipidura is derived from Greek: ρϊπός (pronounced rhipido), meaning fan-like and οὐρά (pronounced oura), meaning tail. Rufifrons comes from two Latin words: rufus meaning red and frons meaning the forehead.

=== Alternate names ===
The Australian rufous fantail is also known by numerous other English names as well as several names in different languages. Some common English names include: rufous-fronted fantail, wood fantail, rufous-fronted flycatcher, wood flycatcher, red fantail, allied flycatcher, rufous flycatcher, rufous fan, red fan or redstart.

=== Related species ===
It is one of over 40 member species of the genus Rhipidura, commonly known as the fantails. Within the genus it belongs to a group of five closely related species: R. rufidorsa, R. brachyrhyncha, R. dahli, R. teysmanni and R. dryas. A molecular phylogeny study showed the Arafura fantail (Rhipidura dryas) to be its closest relative.

It forms a superspecies with R. dryas and R. semirubra, and all three are often considered conspecific. All are part of a larger species group that also includes R. teysmanni, R. superflua, R. dedemi, R. opistherythra, R. lepida, R. rufidorsa, R. dahli, R. matthiae and R. malaitae.

=== Evolution ===
- R. rufidorsa
- - R. brachyrhyncha
  - - R. dahli
    - - R. teysmanni
      - - R. dryas
        - R.rufifrons

Consensus phylogeny tree of a clade within the fantails (Rhipiduridae) according to Nyári et al. (2009)

The current spatial distribution suggests an ancestry originating in the Papuan region, most likely New Guinea. The ancestral form may have had a white chin, white throat, and a light grey breast as well as a greyish-brown head and back. Indirect evidence suggests that ancestral species undertook two periods of aggressive range expansions (dispersal) separated by a period of inactivity.
During the former dispersal period, it is hypothesised by Mayr et al. (1946)
that:

- Dispersal north and westwards formed the superflua on Buru, teijsmanni on Celebes, and lepida on Palau.
- Dispersal to Tenimber Islands in the Banda Sea formed the opistherythra.
- Dispersal to Northern New Guinea formed the rufidorsa.
- Dispersal to Bismarck Archipelago formed the dahli-antonii-matthiae series.
- Dispersal to Southeastern New Guinea and nearby islands evolved into the true rufifrons subspecies.

During the latter dispersal period, the true rufifrons group underwent "explosive sub-speciation". This is in stark contrast to the other members whose evolution was stagnant. The true rufifrons further evolved into eighteen subgroups.

=== Subspecies ===
Two subspecies are recognised:

- R. r. intermedia North, 1902 – Cape York Peninsula, northeast Queensland to southeast Queensland (northeast, central east Australia)
- R. r. rufifrons (Latham, 1801) – southeast SA to northeast New South Wales (southeast Australia)

The Australian rufous fantail was formerly considered to be conspecific with the following six species:

- Supertramp fantail (Rhipidura semicollaris)
- Gilolo fantail (Rhipidura torrida)
- Louisiade fantail (Rhipidura louisiadensis)
- Santa Cruz fantail (Rhipidura melanolaema)
- Micronesian rufous fantail (Rhipidura versicolor)
- Solomons rufous fantail (Rhipidura rufofronta)

== Description ==
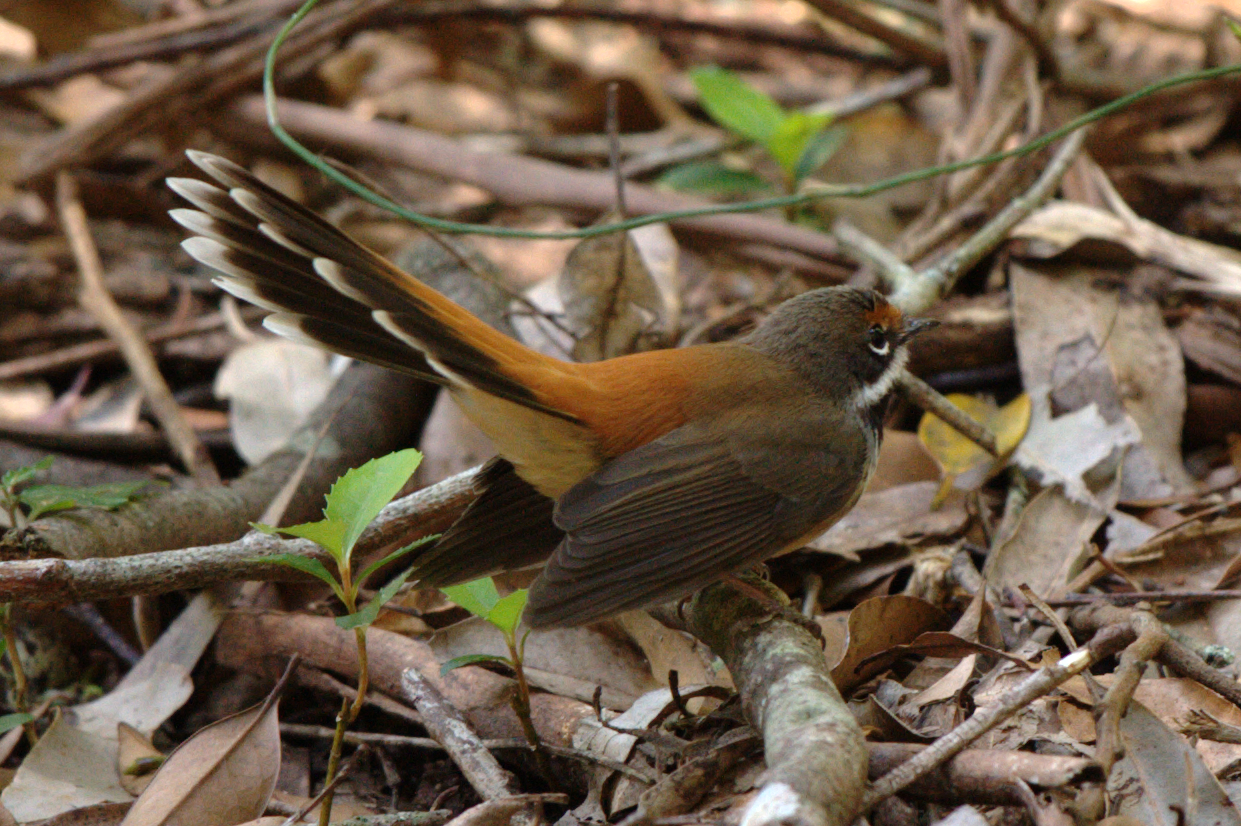
Adult on forest floor, Royal National Park, New South Wales, Australia.

Adults are medium-sized birds, generally ranging from 14.5 cm – 18.5 cm in length, averaging at around 15 cm; their wingspan is between 18 cm – 22.5 cm, averaging at around 21 cm. They weigh roughly 10 grams. The male and female of the species look identical. However, females are generally smaller than the males.

The forehead is a richly reddish-brown colour across the eyes. The eyes have a white arc just below them. The top of the head, back of the neck and the upper back, transition from an olive to reddish-brown colour, which then blends into a blackish-brown, long, fan-shaped tail. This blackish-brown tail, contrasts with the base of the tail, which is tipped with a paler colour, often white.

It has black ear-coverts (feathers over the ears, just below and behind the eyes). The throat is white (in most subspecies), and there is a black bar across the upper breast. Below this, the lower breast is off-white with black scale-like spots which transitions into an off-white colour towards the centre of the abdomen. The eyes, bill and feet of the bird are all a brown colour.

The aforementioned colours do not change during different seasons. However, compared to the adults, the juveniles have generally duller coloured backs and marginally browner tails and underparts. On the other hand, the base of the bill and their legs are a paler brown relative to an adult's.

A physical description that may help distinguishing between the different subspecies can be found in the subspecies section of this article.

The plumage in the immature birds is similar to those of the adults and in both sexes. Adults moult annually prior to the breeding season, and this basic plumage does not vary.

=== Vocalisations ===
These have been not well characterised in the Australian rufous fantail. Nevertheless, it has been observed to create several different types of sounds such as chips, buzzes, and scolds. Their "chip call" is often what first attracts an observer's attention. This call is high pitched, with two chip noises given in quick succession. It is produced during food searching, territory defence and can be used as an alarm call when a predator is identified. They sing after sunset from perches, one reason is to attract the opposite sex.

=== Similar species ===
Whilst it is similar in size and shape to grey fantails (Rhipidura albiscapa), it has a slightly larger fantail and creates higher pitched and softer songs.

Its diagnostic physical features: orange-reddish-brown back, rump and base of tail – easily differentiate it from other fantails. Moreover, it can be further distinguished from similar fantails as it tends to forage in shady and moist regions of habitats that are close to the ground.

== Distribution and habitat ==
=== Distribution ===
The Australian rufous fantail can be found in parts of Australia, southeast Asia, and in the Oceanic regions of Micronesia and Melanesia. They are residents of the Lesser Sunda Islands and the Maluku Islands of Indonesia, southern New Guinea and its associated islands, the Solomon Islands, the Marianas and the Carolinian island of Yap. In Australia, they are found in the northern and eastern coastal regions.

Certain subspecies tend to be restricted to some ranges. See the subspecies section of this article for more detailed information.

=== Habitat ===
The Australian rufous fantail inhabits moist and moderately dense habitats. Within these areas, it has astonishingly large variations in habitat requirements. They can be found in eucalyptus forests, mangroves, rainforests and woodlands (usually near a river or swamp). Rarely, they have even been found in dry sclerophyll forests. Apart from open grasslands and open arid areas, there are not many major types of landscape in the Australo-Papuan region that cannot be inhabited by at least one subspecies of the Australian rufous fantail.

Australian rufous fantails will generally occupy the lower levels of their habitat, the understorey or the subcanopy, straying no further than 6 m from the ground. Different subspecies may tend to prefer slightly different habitats which can be sometimes discrete or overlapping.

== Behaviour and ecology ==
Flitting between branches

Flitting between branches

Studies on Australian rufous fantail's social behaviour are sparse. Some observers have anecdotally described them as curious and trustful, whilst others depict them as shy creatures. However, there is consensus in that they are almost always portrayed as hyperactive, constantly on the move, fidgeting and waving a fanned-out tail.

They are usually observed flitting about in the lower layers of their habitat, in close association with the shade, making short, frequent flights separated by brief moments of perching and sometimes hopping between foliage or onto the ground.

=== Breeding ===
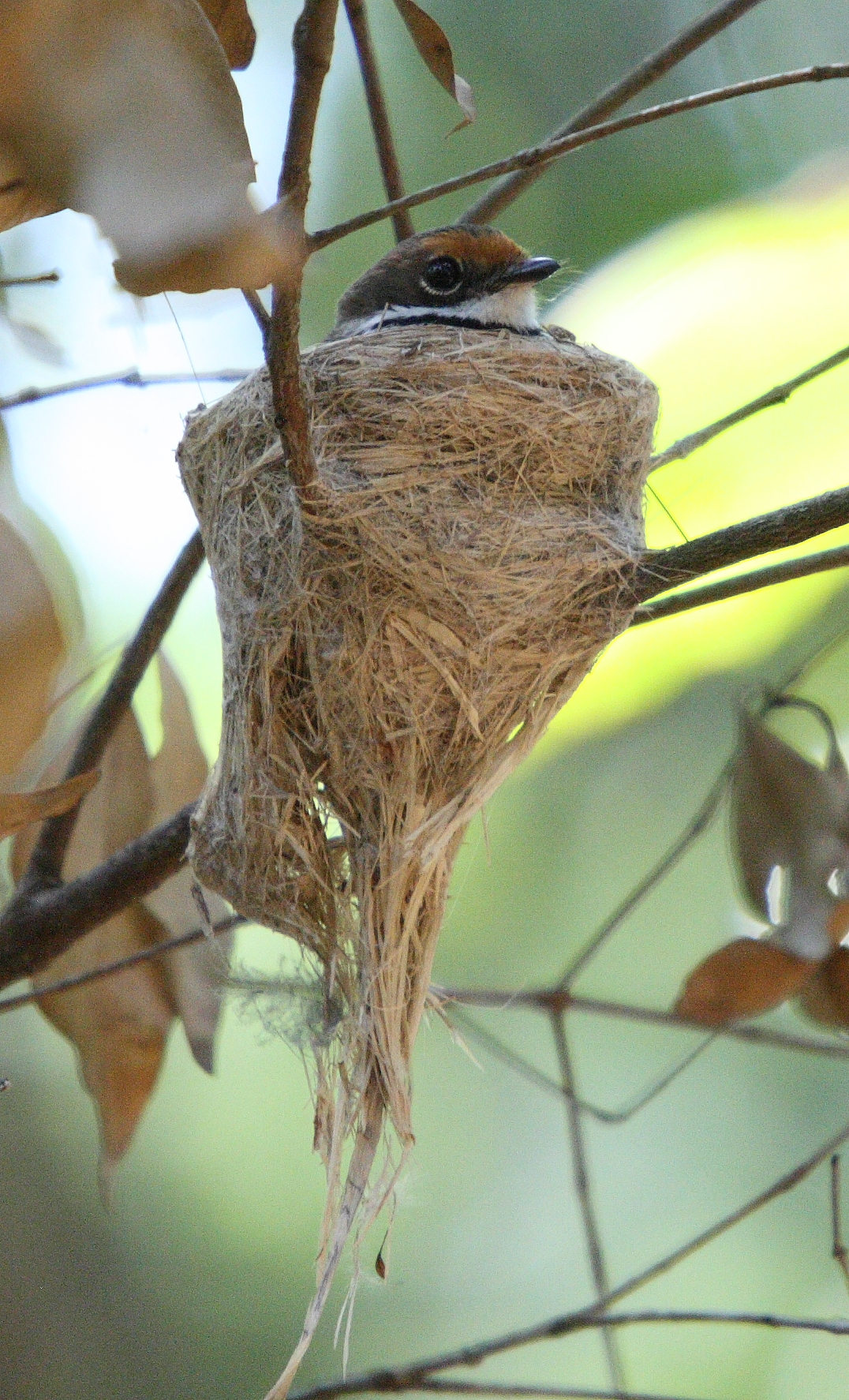
Adult on nest in Iluka, New South Wales, Australia.

When they are spotted, they are usually either on their own or in pairs. Although their social bonding is not well known, they nest in pairs and are thought to be monogamous. Males will produce vocal songs to both defend and advertise their territory. Sometimes this can result in intense, rapid and prolonged vocal "battles".

After pairing, both will search for a suitable breeding site. The female has the final say on nest location. Some males have been known to feed their paired females for up to 2–3 weeks before and during the selection of the nest site and building of the nest. Their breeding sites are mainly in rainforest regions or sheltered, humid gullies with an abundance of dense cover such as trees, saplings, shrubs and vines. The nest, will usually be built at the fork between two nearly horizontal tree branches in proximity to a water source, such as a stream. The structure of the nest is often compared to a wine glass with a broken bottom stand. The nest is built, usually in November, December and January, using thin strips of tree bark, grass, moss rootlets and decayed wood.

The eggs themselves are round or oval in shape and occasionally have a point at one end. Their colour is generally described as somewhere between a pale cream to yellowish white. These have light brown and purplish markings or spots. There are normally 3 or 4 eggs produced in a nest.

Both the males and the females give (frequently alternating) parental care, which includes: feeding their nestlings and removing their faecal sacs from the nest. Whilst only females have actually been observed to incubate (brood) laid eggs, it is assumed males can do this as well.

Four to five weeks after hatching, the young will leave the nest. However, they will remain near their nest (natal area) until they undertake their first migration.

=== Migration ===
Some subspecies have slightly differing migration patterns. However, the vast majority exhibit strong migratory behavior – they use the same route year after year and have regular departure and arrival times. They migrate to south-eastern Australia in the spring to breed, beginning in September, peaking in October, and then north in the autumn during March and April. This has been well characterised.

=== Food and feeding ===
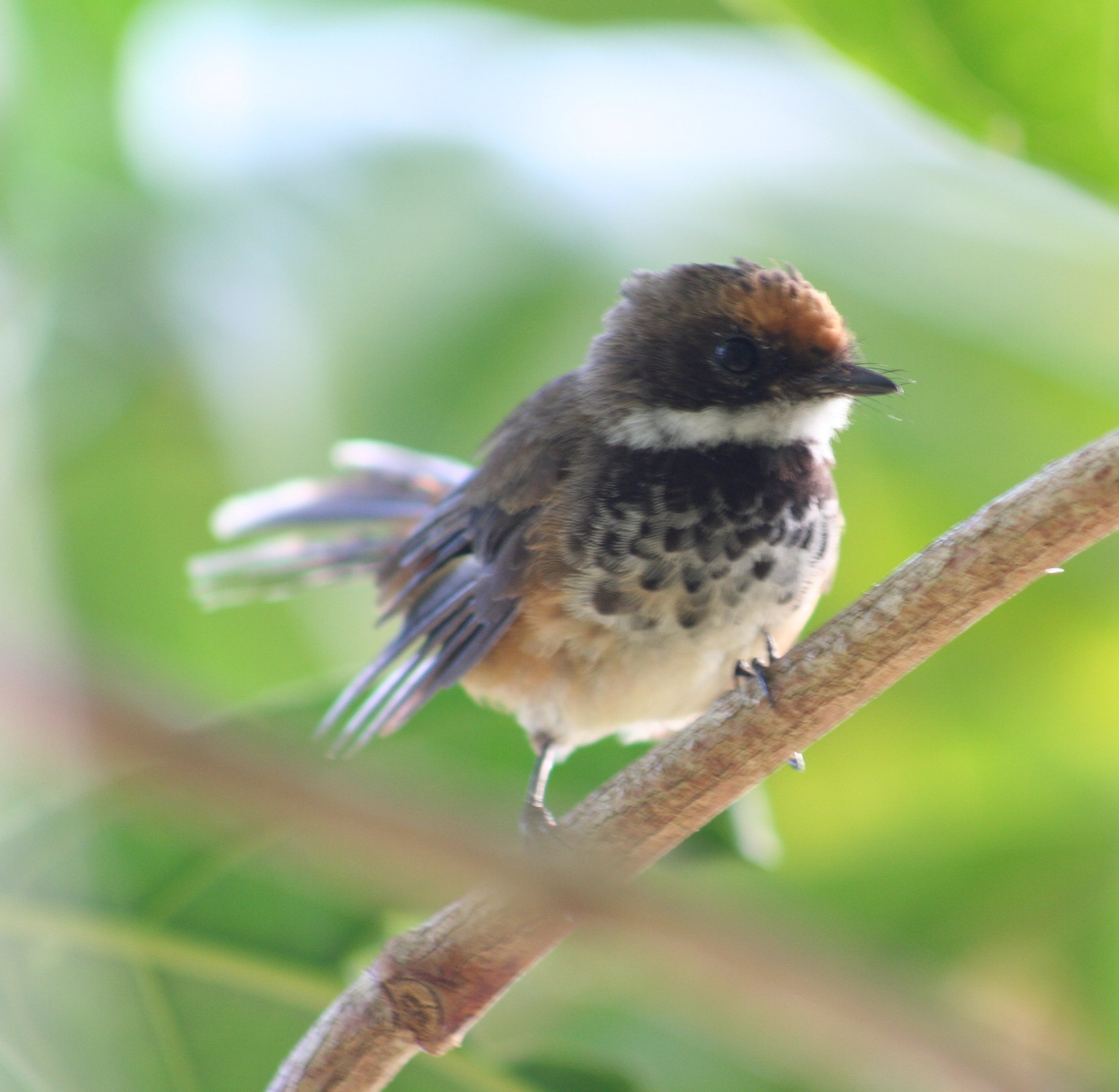
Perched adult in Saipan, Northern Mariana Islands.

They eat mostly small insects and will often join mixed species feeding flocks to do so. These usually comprise other small Passerine birds such as: the spectacled monarch, the little shrikethrush, the large-billed scrubwren and less occasionally, the green-backed honeyeater.

The Australian rufous fantail is mostly an aerial forager, rarely perching during feeding. Prey are found during almost continuous movement in and between vegetation. They stop (perch) for very short periods of time, during which they fan their tails. Much more rarely, they perch for longer than five seconds to survey surroundings.

Once a prey is located, they will pursue it by exhibiting extremely agile and maneuverable flight within the canopy (by salling, flush-pursuit or flutter-chase).

However, they are versatile foragers, also capable of different foraging methods, occasionally hovering to glean prey from leaves and (very rarely) from the ground and other fallen debris. They have longer legs relative to other Rhipidura species, enabling them to have agile movement on the ground as well.

=== Threats/survival ===
Many eggs and young are lost to the suspected predator, the pied currawong (Strepera graculina).

== Relationship to humans ==
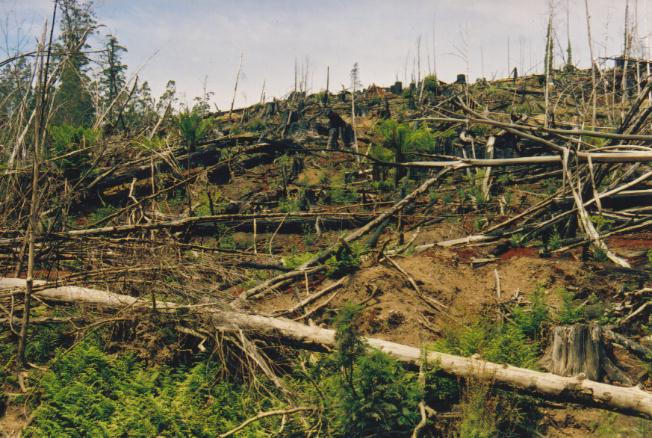
Aftermath of logging in Tasmania, Australia

The logging of forests has been shown to influence foraging preference, changing from the forest floor to the lower canopy. However, they prefer undisturbed forests. Logging decreases breeding habitat and increases the risk of fragmentation, particularly if these forests are in migration routes.

== Status ==
The range of the Australian rufous fantail is very extensive. On this basis it does not have a range small enough to be considered vulnerable (<20,000 km^{2}). Although the population size has not been properly characterised, it is thought to be declining, but not rapidly enough to be placed into vulnerable status. Therefore, the species is of least concern as classified by the IUCN.
