= Henrik Grønvold =

Danish naturalist and artist (1858–1940)

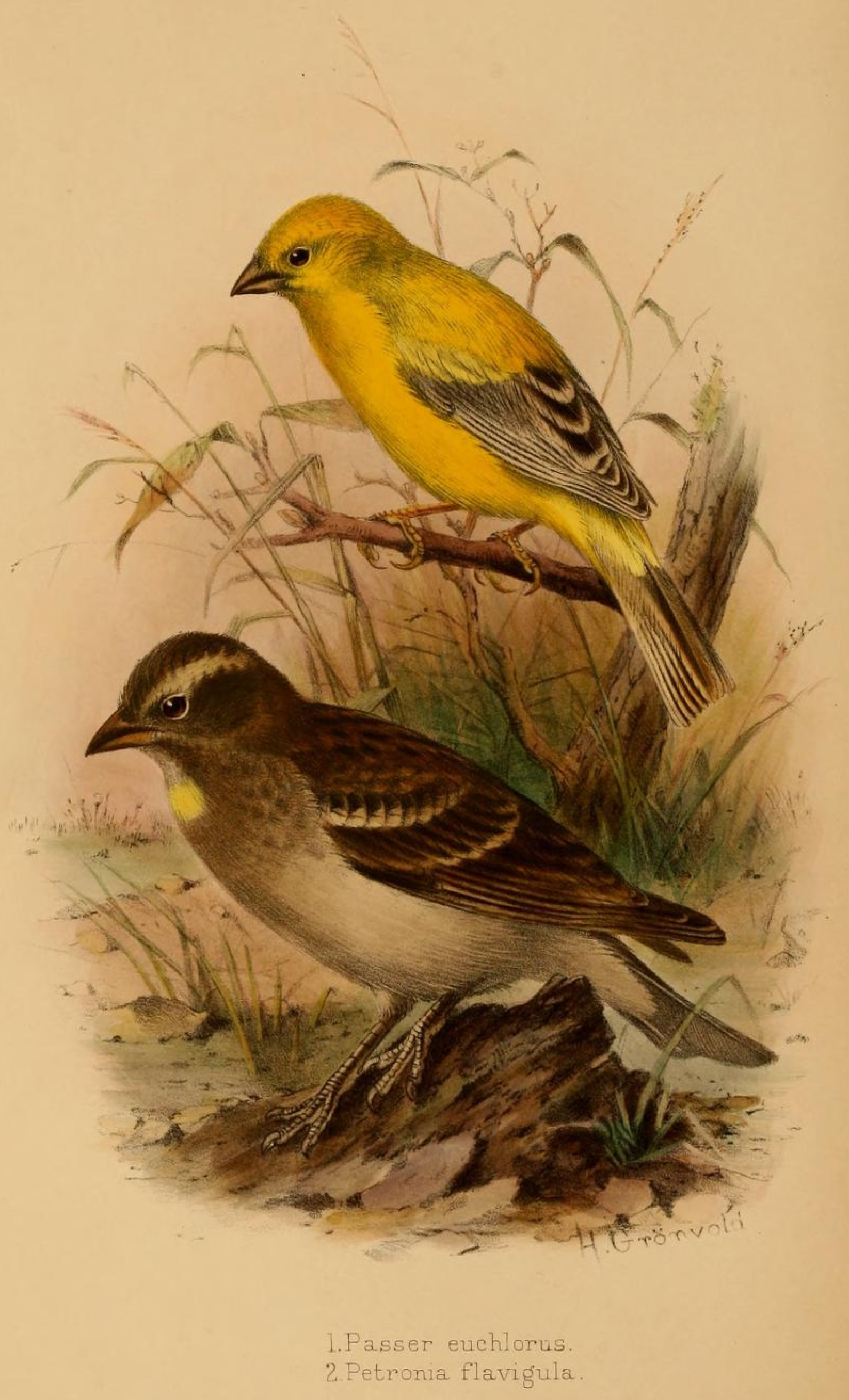
- Grønvold's illustration of an Arabian golden sparrow and a yellow-throated petronia from G. E. Shelley's Birds of Africa
- Born: September 6, 1858; Præstø, Denmark
- Died: March 23, 1940; Bedford, England
- Occupations: Naturalist, illustrator, taxidermist
- Known for: Bird illustrations, lithographs
- Spouse: Josefina Wilhelmina Hillstrøm (1869–1935)
- Children: Elsa Ayres

Henrik Grønvold (6 September 1858 – 23 March 1940) was a Danish naturalist and artist, known for his illustrations of birds. Grønvold was among the last natural history illustrators to publish lithographs.

== Background ==
Henrik Grønvold was born in Præstø, Denmark. He was the son of Hans Peter Levin Grønvold (1822–84) and Wilhelmine Marie Cathrine Lassen (1821–65). He had an early interest in natural history, and an early aptitude for natural history art. In 1880, he went to Copenhagen to learn machine drawing at the Copenhagen Technical College. After graduation, he worked first as a draughtsman of the Royal Danish Army's artillery and an illustrator at the Biological Research Station of Copenhagen.

In 1892, Grønvold left Denmark intending to emigrate to the United States. While stopping in London en route, he was employed at the Natural History Museum preparing anatomical specimens. His Swedish-born wife, Josefina Wilhelmina Hillstrøm (1869–1935), joined him a year later.

== Career ==
Henrik Grønvold became a skilled taxidermist, and established a reputation as an artist. He was employed at the Museum until 1895, when he accompanied William Ogilvie-Grant on an expedition to the Salvage Islands. After this expedition, Grønvold worked at the Museum in an unofficial capacity as an artist for decades, and only left London to attend an ornithological congress in Berlin.

His illustrations largely appeared in scientific periodicals such as the Proceedings and Transactions of the Zoological Society, The Ibis and The Avicultural Magazine. In these publications, he drew plates for William Ogilvie-Grant, George Albert Boulenger, and Michael Rogers Oldfield Thomas, among others. Grønvold also completed numerous plates for Walter Rothschild, many of which appeared in Rothschild's journal Novitates Zoologicae. Grønvold mostly illustrated birds and eggs, rare and newly discovered species from many parts of the world, and mostly worked in lithographs. His egg plates include some of great auk eggs made for Alfred Newton. He made some depictions of mammals as well, and the Natural History Museum collection has oil paintings of apes he made for Rothschild.

Among the books he illustrated were George Shelley's Birds of Africa, which contained 57 plates, many of species that had not been illustrated before. He illustrated W. L. Buller's books on the birds of New Zealand, Brabourne's Birds of South America, Henry Eliot Howard's The British Warblers (1907–14), Charles William Beebe's A Monograph of the Pheasants (1918–22), and Herbert Christopher Robinson's The Birds of the Malay Peninsula (1929–76). He completed 600 hand-coloured plates for twelve volumes of The Birds of Australia (1910–27) by Gregory Macalister Mathews. Grønvold subsequently provided numerous illustrations for Mathews' The Birds of Norfolk and Lord Howe Islands ... (1928) and A Supplement to The Birds of Norfolk and Lord Howe Islands ... (1936) – some of the last publications that were issued with hand-coloured plates.

As a commemoration of his contributions to bird art, the Guinean-Ivory Coast ranged, African rufous-naped lark subspecies Mirafra africana henrici (Bates, 1930) was named for him in 1930 by George Latimer Bates.

Grønvold died at Bedford, England, in 1940. His daughter Elsa Ayres (1899–1985) became a skilled portrait painter and was married to British sculptor Arthur James John Ayres (1902–1985).
