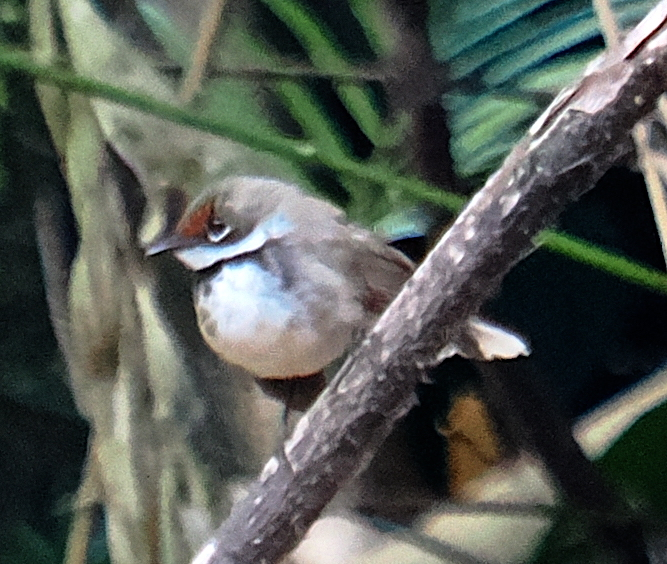
- subsp. semicollaris
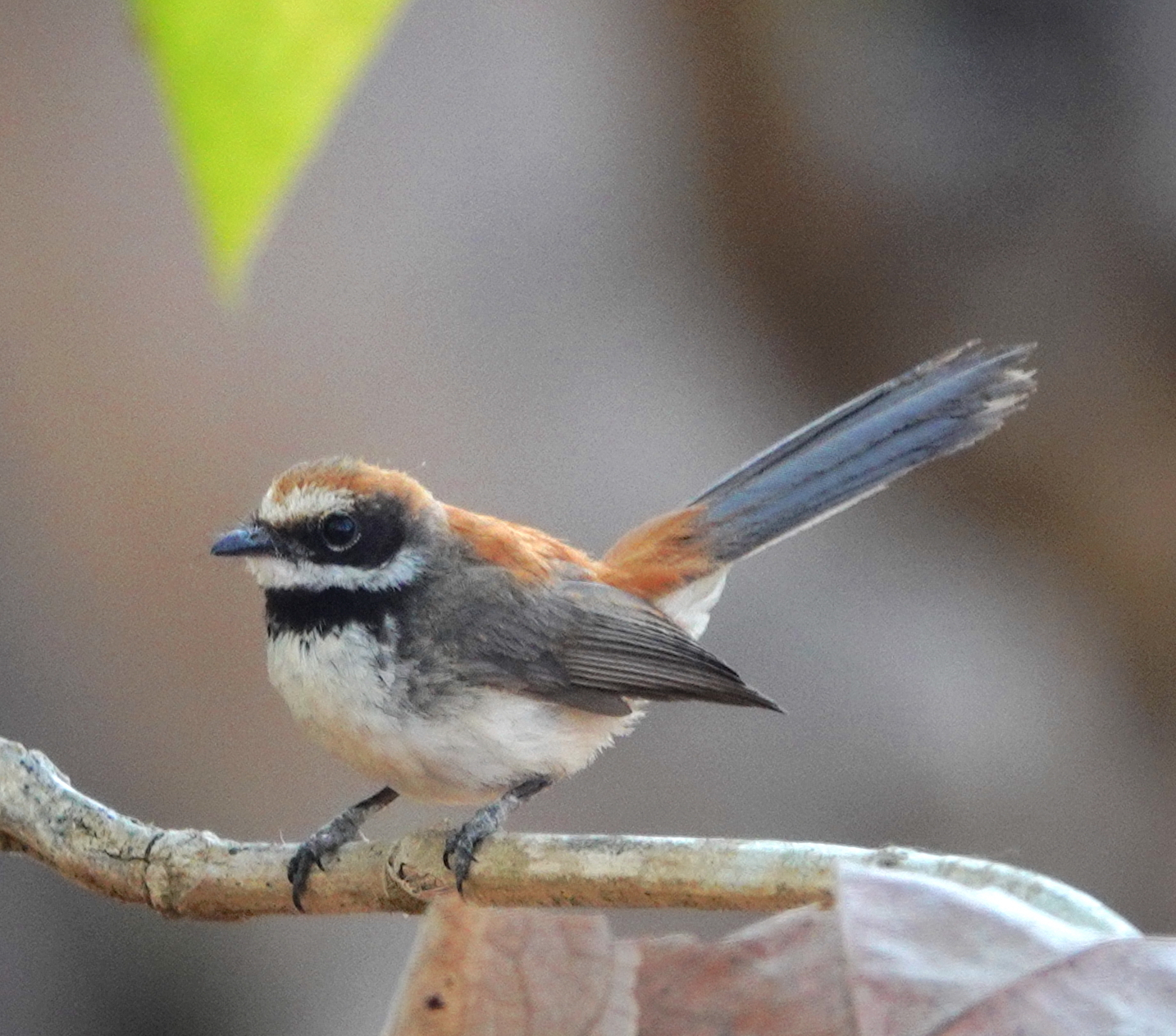
- subsp. elegantula

Scientific classification
- Kingdom: Animalia
- Phylum: Chordata
- Class: Aves
- Order: Passeriformes
- Family: Rhipiduridae
- Genus: Rhipidura
- Species: R. semicollaris

Binomial name
- Rhipidura semicollaris Müller, S, 1843

= Supertramp fantail =

Species of bird

The supertramp fantail (Rhipidura semicollaris) is a species of bird in the family Rhipiduridae that is found on the Lesser Sunda Islands, Maluku Islands, Kai Islands and Aru Islands. It was formerly considered to be subspecies of the Arafura fantail (Rhipidura dryas). Its natural habitat is subtropical or tropical moist lowland forests.

== Taxonomy ==
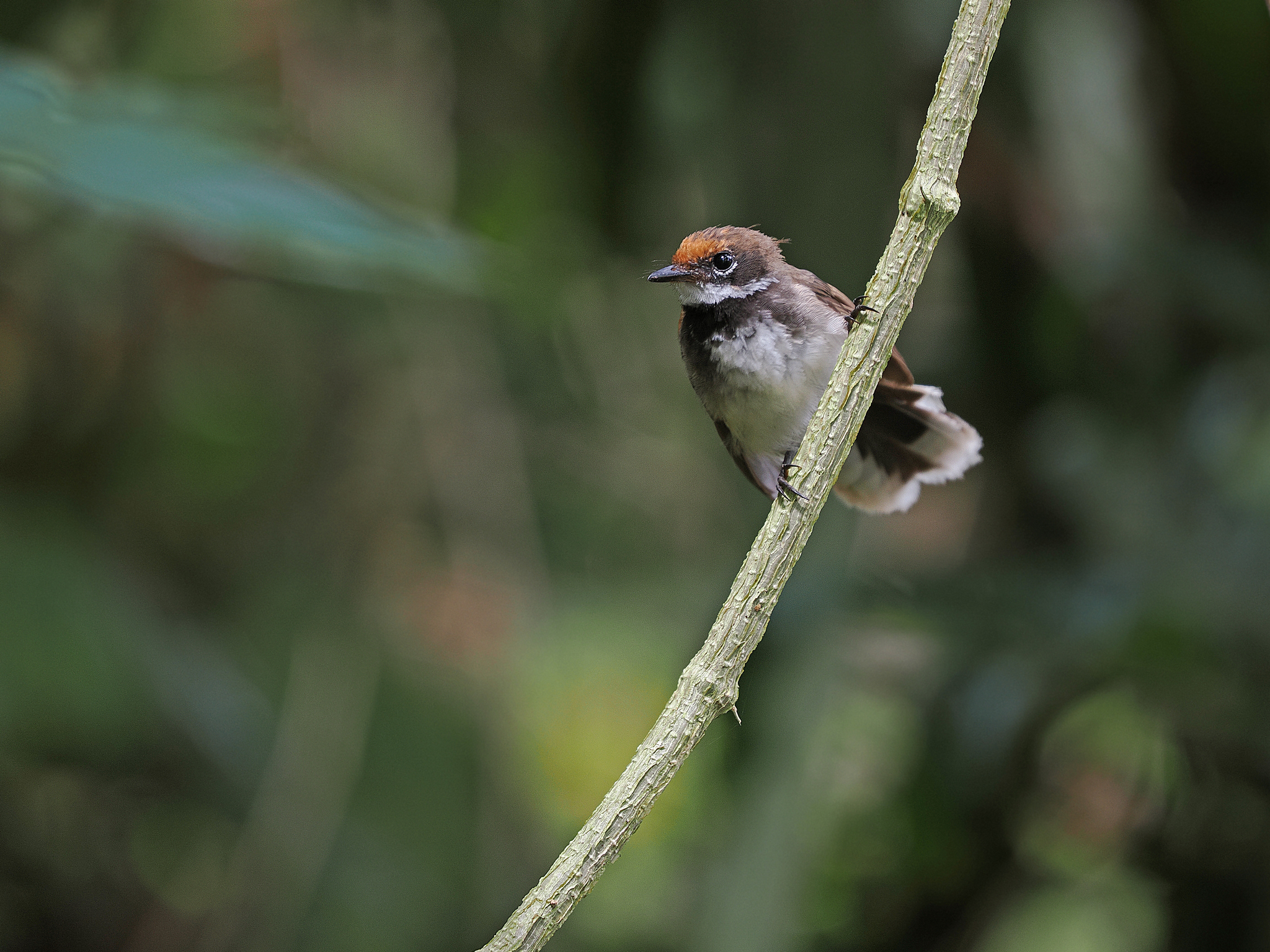
subsp. celebensis

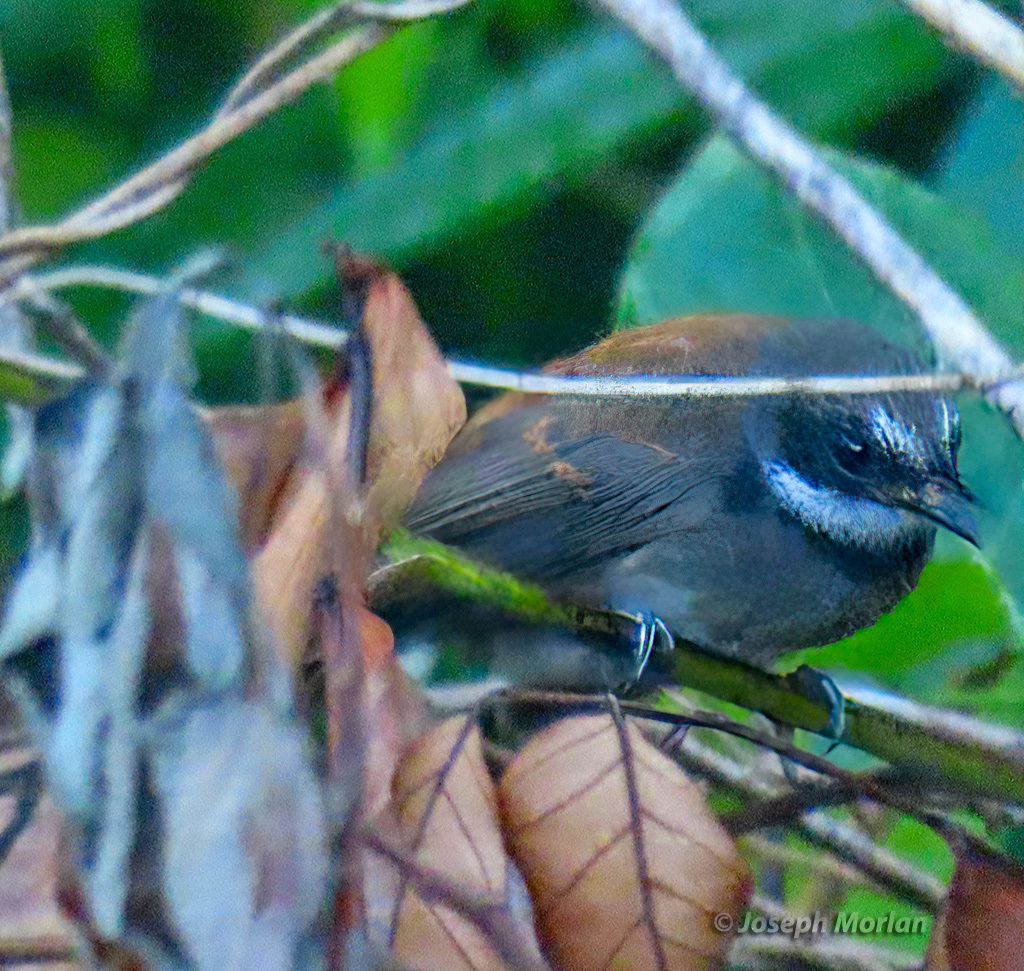
subsp. squamata

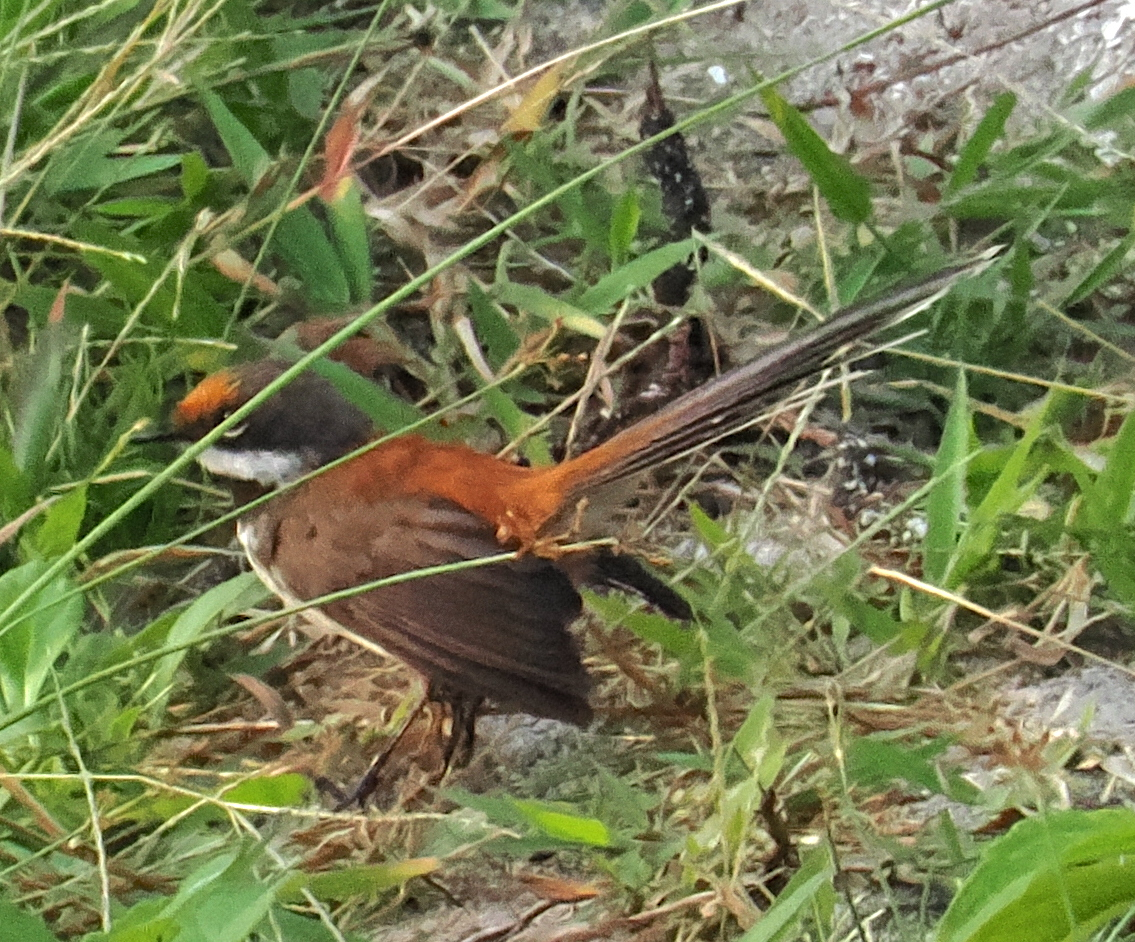
subsp. mimosae

The supertramp fantail was formally described in 1843 by the German naturalist Salomon Müller based on specimens collected in Timor. He placed it with the other fantails in the genus Rhipidura and coined the binomial name Rhipidura semicollaris. The specific epithet combines the Latin semi- meaning "half" with collaris meaning "collared". The supertramp fantail and its subspecies were formerly treated as being conspecific with the Arafura fantail (Rhipidura dryas).

Nine subspecies are recognised:

- Rhipidura semicollaris squamata Müller, S, 1843 – Kekek and Lawin (east of Obi Islands, central north Moluccas), Banda Islands (southwest Moluccas), Raja Ampat Islands (northwest of New Guinea) and Babi (Aru Islands, southwest of New Guinea)
- Rhipidura semicollaris celebensis Büttikofer, 1892 – Tanahjampea and Kalao (south of south Sulawesi)
- Rhipidura semicollaris mimosae Meise, 1929 – Kalaotoa (southeast of south Sulawesi)
- Rhipidura semicollaris sumbensis Hartert, EJO, 1896 – Sumba and Sawu (central south Lesser Sunda Islands)
- Rhipidura semicollaris semicollaris Müller, S, 1843 – Flores to Timor and Wetar (central, east Lesser Sunda Islands)
- Rhipidura semicollaris elegantula Sharpe, 1879 – Romang, Damar Island, Leti and Moa (east Lesser Sunda Islands)
- Rhipidura semicollaris reichenowi Finsch, 1901 – Babar Islands (far east Lesser Sunda Islands)
- Rhipidura semicollaris hamadryas Sclater, PL, 1883 – Tanimbar Islands (south Moluccas)
- Rhipidura semicollaris henrici Hartert, EJO, 1918 – Seram Laut (southeast of Seram, central east Moluccas), Tayandu (west of Kai Islands), Kai Islands (southeast Moluccas) and Aru Islands (southwest of New Guinea)
