= Hickling, Norfolk =

Village in Norfolk, England

Coordinates: 52.76°N 1.57°E

Hickling
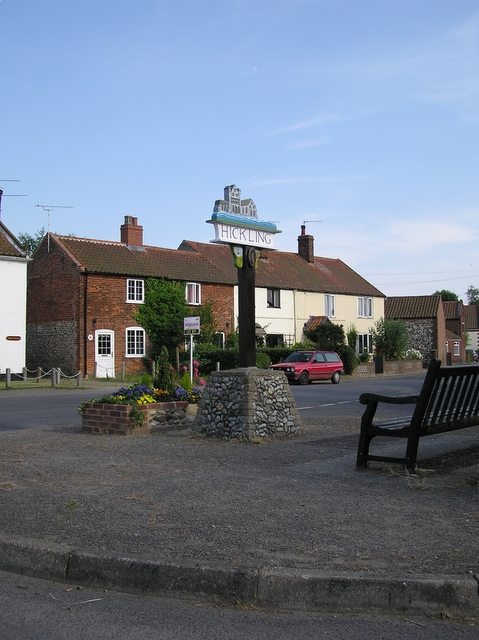
- Hickling Village sign

- Location within Norfolk
- Population: 935 (parish, 2011 census)
- OS grid reference: TG410235
  - London: 137
- Civil parish: Hickling
- District: North Norfolk
- Shire county: Norfolk
- Region: East
- Country: England
- Sovereign state: United Kingdom
- Post town: Norwich
- Postcode district: NR12
- Dialling code: 01692
- Police: Norfolk
- Fire: Norfolk
- Ambulance: East of England
- UK Parliament: North Norfolk

Hickling is a village and a civil parish in the English county of Norfolk. The village is 22 miles south-east of Cromer, 20.3 miles north-east of Norwich and 137 miles north-east of London. It lies 3 miles east of the Broadlands town of Stalham. The nearest railway station is at Worstead for the Bittern Line which runs between Sheringham, Cromer and Norwich.

== Etymology ==
The village's name means 'Hicel's people' or perhaps, 'Hicel's place'.

== Geographical overview ==
It comprises two main parts, Hickling Green and Hickling Heath. Hickling Heath is what usually attracts the most tourists who come on boat trips and moor up at the staithe.

Hickling village is situated on the edge of the Hickling Broads. By using the waterways, it is possible to reach Catfield Dyke, Potter Heigham and even Great Yarmouth. Because it leads to the sea, the waters are slightly tidal and, depending on the time of year, the water levels can heavily rise or fall. There are many thatched huts dotted along the broads, one of the oldest being Turner's Hut.

Adjacent to the village is the site of Hickling Priory, a house of Augustinian Canons which operated from 1185 to 1534. The 18th-century Hickling Hall was destroyed by fire in December 2014.

== Windmills ==
There are three windmills in Hickling. One is a corn mill, the other two are drainage mills. A fourth mill was demolished in the 1960s.

Hickling Mill, built on Hickling Heath in 1818, is a grade II* listed windmill which is one of the few to have been preserved in almost original condition, with most of the mechanism, apart from the sails and fantail, relatively intact.

Roland Green's Mill was built c. 1860. It was converted to a studio by the artist Roland Green in the 1960s'.

Stubb Mill was built c.1808. It worked until 1947 and has been restored.

Eastfield Mill was a drainage mill built in the 19th century. It was derelict by 1950 and was demolished c.1962.

== History ==
During the St. Lucia's flood in 1287 180 inhabitants died, when the seawater rose a foot above the high altar in the church.
