= Roland Green's Mill, Hickling =

Windmill in Hickling, Norfolk, England

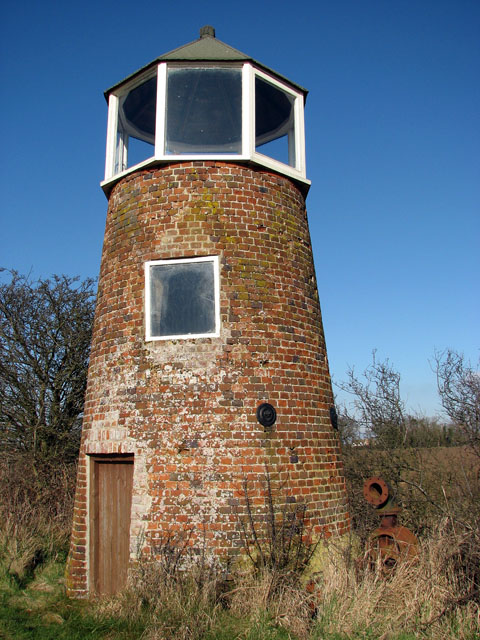
- Roland Green's Mill, February 2009
- Interactive map of Roland Green's Mill, Hickling

Origin
- Mill name: Roland Green's Mill
- Mill location: Hickling, Norfolk, United Kingdom
- Grid reference: TG 419 221
- Coordinates: 52°44′33″N 1°34′54″E
- Year built: C.1860

Information
- Purpose: Drainage mill
- Type: Tower mill
- Storeys: Two storeys
- No. of sails: Four

Roland Green's, Chapman's or Hudson-Barber Mill is a tower mill at Hickling, Norfolk, United Kingdom. Built as a drainage mill, it was later converted to a studio by the artist Roland Green.

== History ==
Roland Green's Mill was built c.. It had ceased working by 1905. The mill was converted to a studio by the artist Roland Green. c.1960. Green was living on a houseboat at the time. He later built a bungalow near the mill. Arthur C. Smith surveyed the mill on 10 April 1972 and again on 25 May 1978. He described the mill as a derelict tower with an octagonal look-out on top, missing its glazing. Smith surveyed the mill again on 26 June 1988. He noted a derelict pump was beside the tower.

== Description ==
Roland Green's Mill is a two storey tower mill. The tower is 16 feet 6 inches (5.03 m) tall and 10 feet 9 inches (3.28 m) external diameter at ground floor level, with walls 18 inches (460 mm) thick.
