= Roland Green (painter) =

English bird artist

"Kingfisher and young"

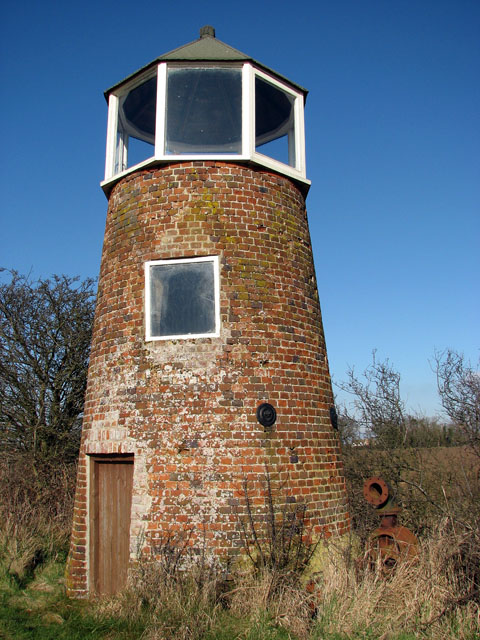
Roland Green's Mill, Hickling Broad

Roland J. Green (9 January 1890 – 18 December 1972) was an English bird artist, who produced numerous bird studies in watercolours and oils. Green remained a bachelor throughout his life, making his home in a disused drainage mill at Hickling in Norfolk. He set many of his bird paintings in the Broads, capturing some of the wild beauty of this region in his distinctive style.

Roland Green was born in Rainham, Kent, the son of a taxidermist, who trained him in the skinning, stuffing and setting up birds, thereby instilling an extensive knowledge of anatomy and plumage. He showed an early aptitude for drawing and painting birds. Educated in Rochester and at the Regent Street Polytechnic, he was a skilled bird and mammal painter, holding annual exhibitions of his paintings and etchings. The subjects of his etchings were snipe, Canada geese, mallard and kingfishers. He also gave lectures on bird watching and the drawing of birds, with an emphasis on birds in flight. He spent a great deal of time in the reedbeds, creating the mistaken impression of being unsociable, but his talks to pupils at various schools dispelled that notion. Green was commissioned by Lord Desborough of Hickling Estate in Norfolk to paint a frieze at Whiteslea Lodge, showing the birds of Hickling Broad.

== Works illustrated by Green ==
- The Birds of Australia – Gregory Mathews (Witherby: London, 1910–27)
- Birds in Flight – William Plane Pycraft (Gay & Hancock, London, 1922)
- Birds and their Young – Thomas Coward (Gay & Hancock: London, 1923)
- The Life of Birds (Book 4 of the How & Why Series) - T. A. Coward (A & C Black, 1931)
- Wing To Wing – Bird Watching Adventures at Home and Abroad with the R.A.F. – E.H. Ware (Paternoster Press, 1946) ASIN: B0007KCFUG
- My Book of Birds – Roland Green, Sheppard Raymond (Macmillan's Easy Study Series, 1949)
- The Ladybird Book of British Wild Animals – George Cansdale (Wills & Hepworth Ltd, 1958)

== Published books on Green ==
- "A Homage to Roland Green – His Norfolk Legacy" – David Joel (St Barbe Museum and Art Gallery, Lymington)

== See also ==
- Category:Paintings by Roland Green
