= Hickling Hall =

House in Hickling, Norfolk, England

Coordinates: 52.7640°N 1.5744°E

Hickling Hall was a grade II listed house in Hickling, Norfolk, England. Dating from the 18th century, it was destroyed by fire on Boxing Day, 26 December 2014.

The building was made from brick, with a slate roof, and had two stories across seven bays, with a dormer roof. It was accorded grade II status in 1955. The hall is currently being rebuilt. As of mid-summer 2016, missing brickwork has been replaced and new floors have been fitted.
