= The Birds of the Malay Peninsula =

Series of books

- Author: Herbert Christopher Robinson
- Illustrator: Henrik Grönvold
- Language: English
- Genre: Reference
- Publisher: Witherby Publishing Group
- Publication date: 1927
- Publication place: United Kingdom
- ISBN: 0-85493-104-X

The Birds of the Malay Peninsula is a major illustrated ornithological reference work conceived and started by Herbert Christopher Robinson. The full title is The Birds of the Malay Peninsula: a general account of the birds inhabiting the region from the isthmus of Kra to Singapore with the adjacent islands. It comprises five substantial (large octavo) hardbound volumes of text, with 125 plates (123 in colour) by Henrik Grönvold and 11 maps. It was published by H. F. and G. Witherby, London. The binding of the first four volumes was red buckram; the fifth was red cloth with a dust jacket.

== History ==
Robinson served as Director of Museums in the Federated Malay States in the early 20th century. On his retirement in 1926 he started to write the first of the five volumes of the series, with financial support for publication coming from the government of the Federated Malay States. The aim was to provide a treatment of the birds that could appeal to both professionals and serious amateurs. The price was set at seven guineas for subscribers to all five volumes or thirty-five shillings for a single volume.

Robinson was able to complete the first two volumes before his death in 1929. With the help of Robinson's notes and papers, the third and fourth volumes were prepared by Frederick Nutter Chasen, the Director of the Raffles Museum in Singapore. The fifth volume was delayed by Chasen's death in 1942. It was finally completed by Lord Medway and David Wells in 1976, in a review of which D.G. Robertson says:

"After the war E. Banks, former Curator of the Sarawak Museum, wrote a replacement text and deposited it in the British Museum (Natural History). In 1964, Ken Scriven, a long-time resident of Malaysia, was in London and quite by chance discovered not only Banks's text but also the coloured plates by H. Gronvold. He informed Lord Medway and David Wells who in turn decided to complete the series. Witherby, publisher of Volumes I to IV, agreed to produce Volume V using typesetting, paper and layout identical with the previous volumes and in 1976 the task was completed, almost fifty years after its inception. The authors have revised and updated Banks's text and, because Volumes I to IV are almost priceless, have amended Chasen's original intentions so that Volume V can stand on its own."

== Reviews ==
The first volume of The Birds of the Malay Peninsula was published in 1927 and was reviewed by an anonymous contributor to the Auk who described the volume as "handsome," noting in particular that it was "attractively printed and bound" and that it contains twenty-five color plates of birds that until then had not previously been illustrated. Also praised was its map of the Malayan peninsula. The reviewer was well pleased with the book writing of his wish that "we might have such works on the birds of some of the South American countries!" and concluding that it was "a credit to all concerned and not only a handy work of reference but a handsome volume for the ornithological library."

A second review of the first volume appeared in Nature. This was more critical in its stance with the reviewer noting that although the overall classification scheme was based on Sharpe's Handlist, at several points it had been altered "according to the author's personal ideas" rather than following the general ornithological consensus of the time. Also faulted was the lack of a clear rational to the order in which certain families such as the Rollers, Kingfishers, Bee-eaters appeared. This the reviewer believed was "a convenient and easy method to adopt, but surely not very scientific." The names given to some of the birds was also called into question. On the other hand, the reviewer praised the "excellent geographical preamble" declaring that "there can be very few people who will not be able to learn a great deal from this" and observed that the book as a whole "is well worthy of the great reputation the author already enjoys." And the review concludes by congratulating Robinson "on having been completely successful in bringing out a work which is very badly needed and one which will undoubtedly, for many years to come, be the standard work of the birds of the Malay region."

A third review appeared in the Straits Times, a local newspaper based in Singapore. Written by C. Boden Kloss, Director of the Raffles Museum in Singapore from 1923 to 1932, the review was positive. Boden Kloss considered the work to be unique in its scope, fulfilling a need that had existed for "a publication which is not too technical for the non-scientific bird-lover in Malaya."

The complete set contains:

- Robinson, H.C. (1927). The Birds of the Malay Peninsula. Vol.I: The Commoner Birds. Witherby: London. pp. 329.
- Robinson, H.C. (1928). The Birds of the Malay Peninsula. Vol.II: The Birds of the Hill Stations. Witherby: London. pp.xxii, 310.
- Robinson, H.C.; & Chasen, F.N. (1936). The Birds of the Malay Peninsula. Vol.III: Sporting Birds: Birds of the Shore and Estuaries. Witherby: London. pp.xxi, 264.
- Robinson, H.C.; & Chasen, F.N. (1939). The Birds of the Malay Peninsula. Vol.IV: The Birds of the Low-Country Jungle and Scrub. Witherby: London. pp.xxvi, 487.
- Medway, Lord; & Wells, David R. (1976). The Birds of the Malay Peninsula. Vol.V: Conclusion, and Survey of Every Species. Witherby: London. pp.xxxi, 448. ISBN 0-85493-104-X
