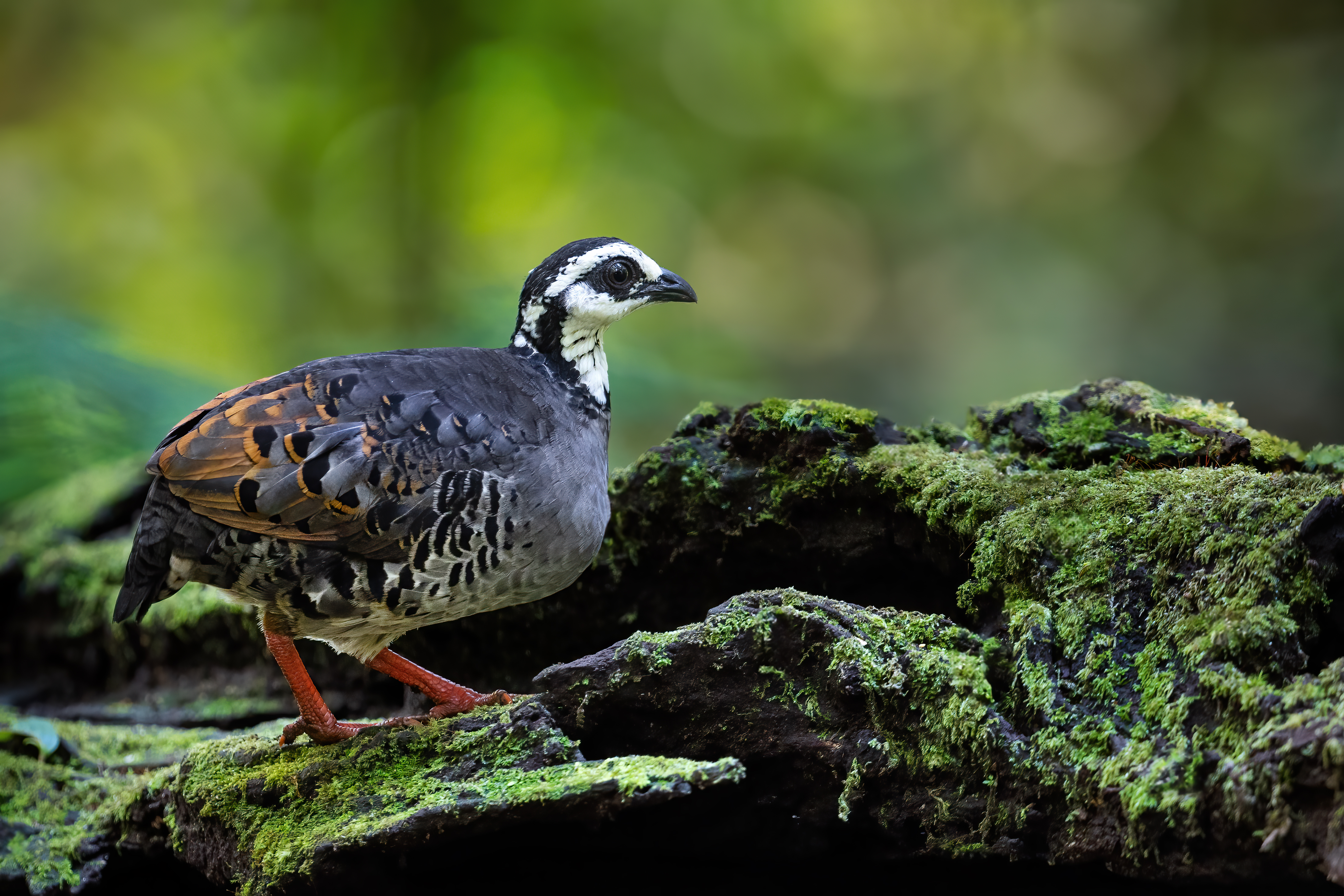
- Adult specimen in Kawah Ijen Merapi Unggup-unggup Nature Preserve, Banyuwangi Regency, East Java

Conservation status
- Vulnerable (IUCN 3.1)

Scientific classification
- Kingdom: Animalia
- Phylum: Chordata
- Class: Aves
- Order: Galliformes
- Family: Phasianidae
- Genus: Arborophila
- Species: A. orientalis

Binomial name
- Arborophila orientalis (Horsfield, 1821)

Synonyms
- Perdix orientalis Horsfield, 1821

= Grey-breasted partridge =

Species of bird

The grey-breasted partridge (Arborophila orientalis), also known as the white-faced hill partridge, or Horsfield's hill partridge, is a bird species in the family Phasianidae.

It is endemic to highland forest in the eastern salient of Java, Indonesia. Sightings have been mostly reported from frequently visited nature preserves such as Kawah Ijen in Banyuwangi.

Measuring 28 cm (11 in), this species is a stocky, short-legged bird. Its mostly grey plumage is barred on the lower back and tail. It has a black crown and nape, and conspicuous white forehead, cheeks and throat. Bare skin around the eyes is red. The bill is black and the legs are red.

Some authorities include the Malayan, Roll's and Sumatran partridges as subspecies of the grey-breasted partridge.

The grey-breasted partridge is threatened by habitat loss.
