= The Birds of Australia (Mathews) =

Handbook about birds by Gregory Mathews

- Author: Gregory Mathews
- Language: English
- Subject: Australian birds
- Genre: Ornithological handbook
- Publisher: Witherby: London
- Publication date: 1910-1927
- Publication place: United Kingdom
- Media type: Print, with hand-coloured lithographed plates

The Birds of Australia is a 12-volume ornithological handbook covering the birds of Australia. It was the second of three monumental illustrated works dealing with the avifauna of the continent and was published midway between the other two, the first being Gould's identically titled The Birds of Australia (1840–1848), and the third the Handbook of Australian, New Zealand and Antarctic Birds (1990–2006).

== History ==
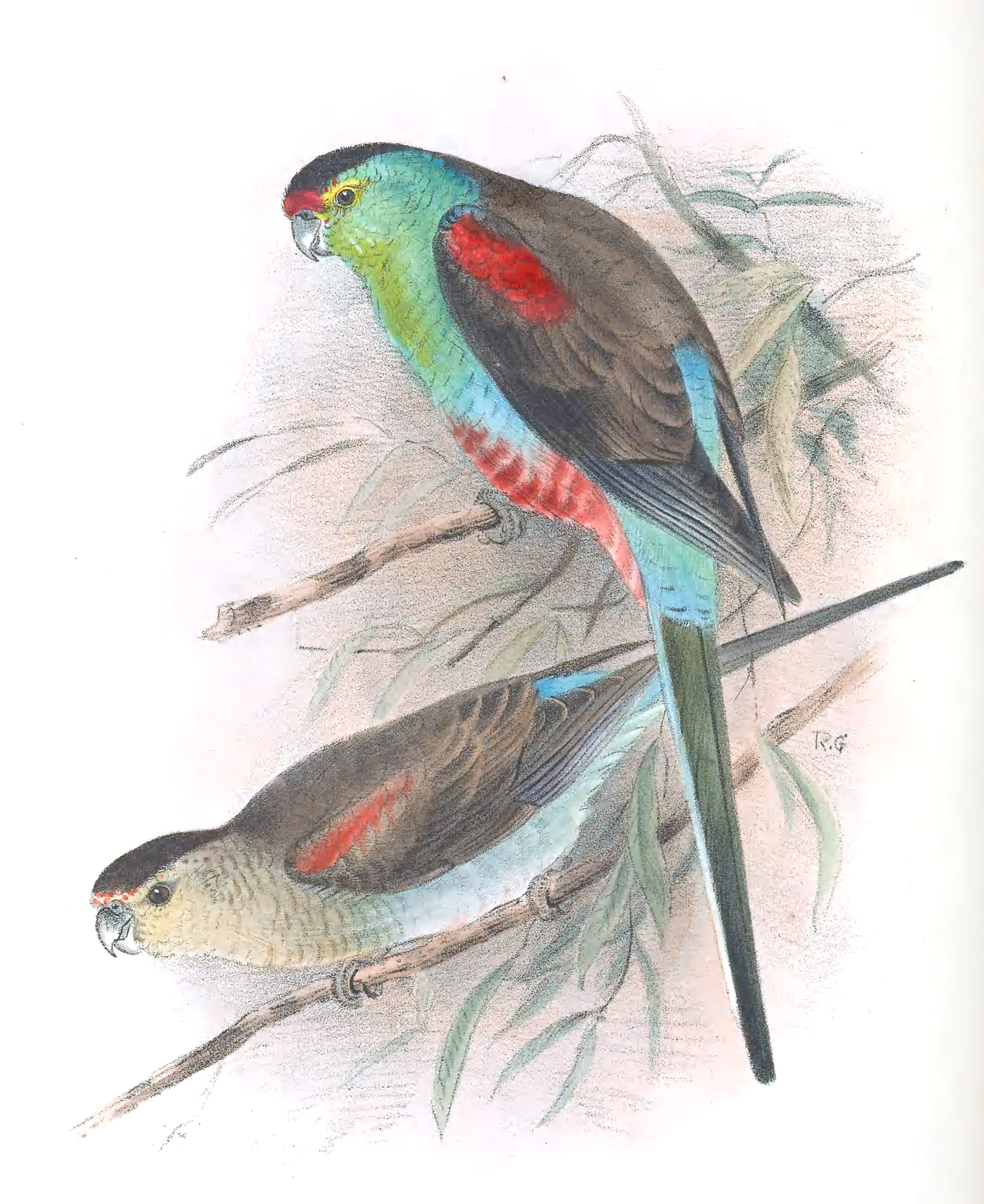
Now extinct paradise parrot (Psephotellus pulcherrimus) from Vol. 6

It was sponsored and authored by wealthy Australian amateur ornithologist Gregory Mathews, with considerable assistance from his collaborator and private secretary Tom Iredale, and was published by H. F. & G. Witherby of London over a 17-year period from 1910 to 1927. The text and plates, comprising 12 volumes, were issued serially in 75 parts in royal quarto format in an edition of 225 numbered copies. The five supplements issued at various times during the long publication period fill a 13th, supplementary, volume; the first three supplements comprising the Check-List of Australian Birds, and the last two the Bibliography of the Birds of Australia.

When the publication was complete it was reviewed in the RAOU journal The Emu by J. A. Leach (as J.A.L.) who wrote:

In these twelve splendid volumes, Mr Mathews has stressed largely the nomenclatural aspect, a phase of ornithology which received little attention from John Gould in the eight folio volumes of his highly valued work, The Birds of Australia. Gould seldom listed a date, and therefore he failed to recognize occasionally that another name listed by him was really older than the name used by him. He was a firm believer in the use of the prior name; this he showed by changing when necessary to an older name. These two great ornithological works which have the same title, and of which Australians are justly proud are thus complementary. Gould emphasized the field and natural history sides, while Mathews stressed the academic and nomenclatural aspects. An Australian student having the use of these fine volumes is well equipped with material on which to base future studies.

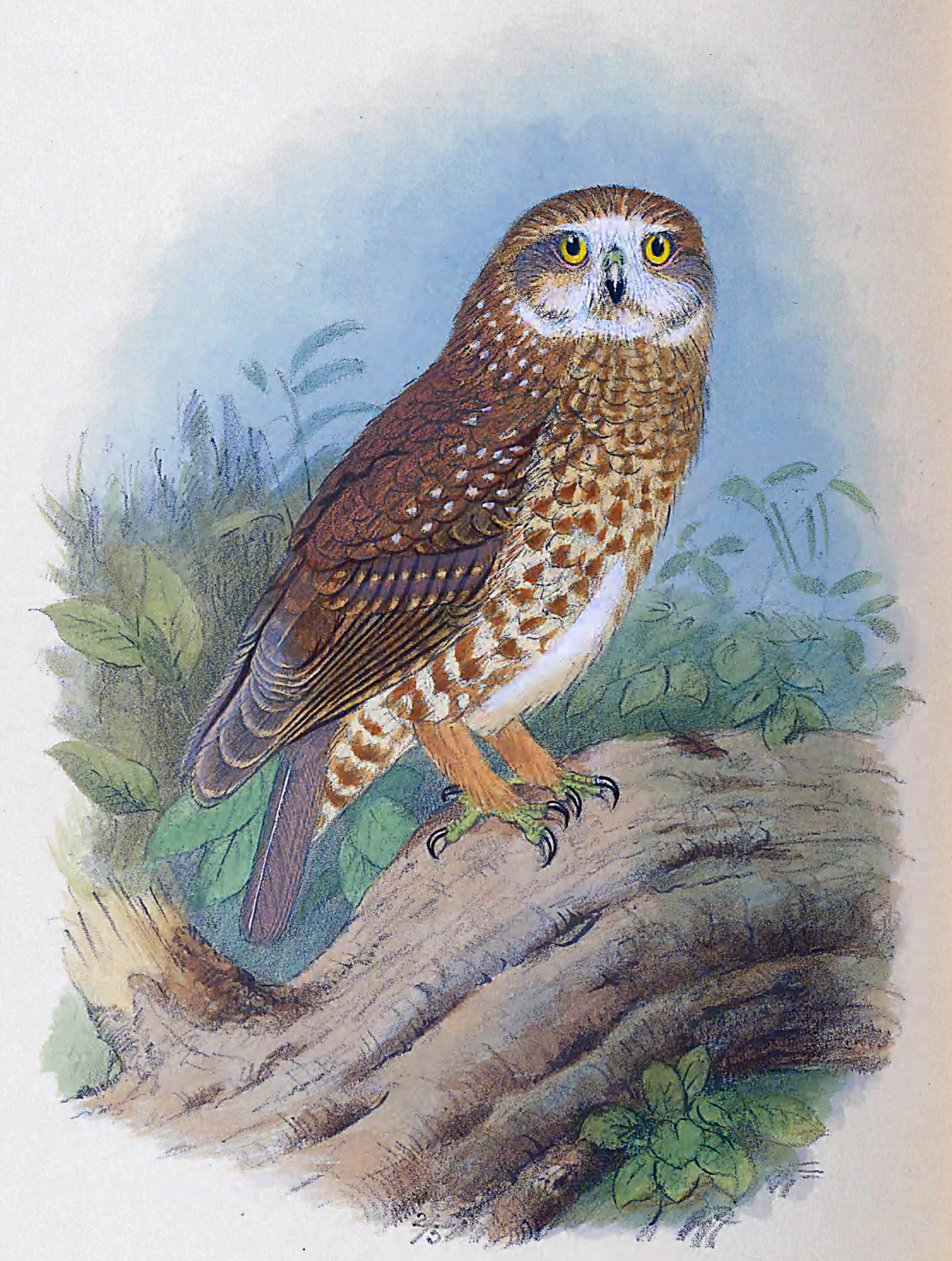
Illustration of now extinct Lord Howe Boobook (Ninox novaeseelandiae albaria) from The Birds of Australia

Mathews’ approach to nomenclature was controversial and not always consistent. In a review in the AOU journal The Auk, the editor Witmer Stone comments:

It is interesting in view of Mr Mathews's many discussions of nomenclature to see how his attitude on certain points changed as his work progressed. In the opening volume he congratulates the authorities of the British Museum upon their intention of ignoring many of the 'useless generic names' of the late Dr Bowdler Sharpe and yet in a few years we see Mr Mathews as one of the most extreme genus splitters that ornithology has known. So again in spite of his vigorous plea for the universal use of subspecies we find him, by the time Vol. V is reached, refusing to give them the full recognition in the text that they had previously received and simply discussing them at the end of each species. And what is far worse placing them in the synonymy where they cannot be distinguished from the real synonyms. The number and treatment of subspecies however are ornithological problems, always subject to personal opinion, with no possible 'code' to govern them. [...] We have felt that the great amount of space devoted to nomenclatural discussion in the 'Birds of Australia' was unfortunate as most of the facts could usually have been stated without nearly so much verbiage and often the very fact that the author was endeavoring to bring out has been obscured by useless repetition. It seems as if some parts of the text may have been printed from a hastily prepared manuscript without revision. We have discussed Mr Mathews’ great work from a nomenclatural point of view because that seems to have been the author's chief concern in its production and that is the feature that will be remembered in the future. He has, however, collected a great deal of valuable and interesting data on the lives and habits of the birds but as he tells us the adequate life histories of the Australian birds are yet to be written and his aim has been to clear away the technical difficulties in Australian ornithology and set up the species and their names on a permanent basis. This we feel that he has done or at least has presented all of the necessary information on the subject, an achievement of which he may well be proud.

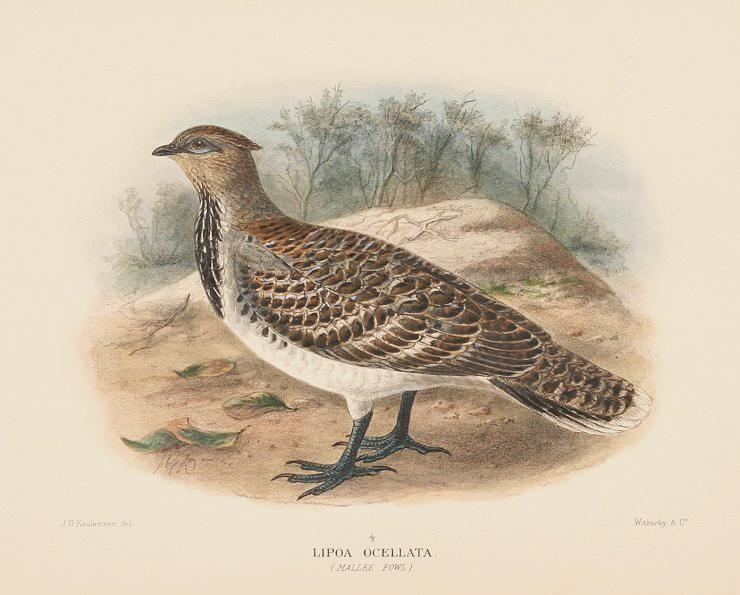
Lipoa ocellata (malleefowl) from Volume I. Keulemans

As well as the extensive scientific text, in which Mathews described several new species and subspecies, the 12 volumes are illustrated with some 600 hand-coloured lithographed plates by J.G. Keulemans (who completed 163 illustrations for the first four volumes before his death on 29 March 1912), H. Grönvold, Roland Green, Herbert Goodchild and G.E. Lodge. Stone commented on the plates by saying that as artistic productions they could not be compared with the great folios of John Gould, though those by Keulemans were probably the best.

== Associated works ==
After completing the publication of the 12 volumes, in 1928 Mathews produced The Birds of Norfolk and Lord Howe Islands and the Australian South Polar Quadrant, in the same format and with the same publisher, containing 45 lithographic plates. It was followed in 1936 by A Supplement to the Birds of Norfolk and Lord Howe Islands to which is Added those Birds of New Zealand not figured by Buller, containing 57 plates. Although not technically part of The Birds of Australia, these two volumes extend its coverage to Australia's Norfolk Island and Lord Howe Island in the Tasman Sea, and even attempt to fill in the gaps left in Walter Buller’s coverage of New Zealand in his similarly ambitious A History of the Birds of New Zealand (1872–1873, 2nd edition 1887–1888).

== Publication dates ==
Publication dates of the various parts are as follows:

=== Parts ===
Volume 1

- 1 – 31 October 1910
- 2 – 31 January 1911
- 3 – 29 April 1911
- 4 – 9 August 1911
- 5 – 31 October 1911
- 6 – 31 January 1912

Volume 2

- 1 – 30 May 1912
- 2 – 31 July 1912
- 3 – 20 September 1912
- 4 – 1 November 1912
- 5 – 31 January 1913

Volume 3

- 1 – 2 April 1913
- 2 – 2 May 1913
- 3 – 18 August 1913
- 4 – 31 December 1913
- 5 – 26 March 1914
- 6 – 25 June 1914

Volume 4

- 1 – 6 October 1914
- 2 – 17 February 1915
- 3 – 23 June 1915

Volume 5

- 1 – 5 November 1915
- 2 – 29 Feb 1916
- 3 – 23 May 1916
- 4 – 30 August 1916

Volume 6

- 1 – 22 November 1916
- 2 – 6 February 1917
- 3 – 17 April 1917
- 4 – 27 June 1917
- 5 – 11 September 1917
- 6 – 11 December 1917

Volume 7

- 1 – 4 March 1918
- 2 – 15 May 1918
- 3 – 26 August 1918
- 4 – 19 December 1918
- 5 – 10 July 1919

Volume 8

- 1 – 5 May 1920
- 2 – 17 June 1920
- 3 – 18 August 1920
- 4 – 13 October 1920
- 5 – 15 December 1920

Volume 9

- 1 – 15 February 1921
- 2 – 15 April 1921
- 3 – 20 June 1921
- 4 – 19 October 1921
- 5 – 15 December 1921
- 6 – 15 February 1922
- 7 – 4 April 1922
- 8 – 22 May 1922
- 9 – 3 August 1922

Volume 10

- 1 – 28 September 1922
- 2 – 12 December 1922
- 3 – 30 January 1923
- 4 – 19 March 1923
- 5 – 24 April 1923
- 6 – 5 June 1923
- 7 – 26 July 1923

Volume 11

- 1 – 8 October 1923
- 2 – 21 November 1923
- 3 – 27 December 1923
- 4 – 20 February 1924
- 5 – 2 April 1924
- 6 – 21 June 1924
- 7 – 31 July 1924
- 8 – 25 October 1924
- 9 – 22 December 1924

Volume 12

- 1 – 3 March 1925
- 2 – 11 May 1925
- 3 – 22 June 1925
- 4 – 31 August 1925
- 5 – 23 November 1925
- 6 – 24 March 1926
- 7 – 28 June 1926
- 8 – 6 September 1926
- 9 – 6 December 1926
- 10 – 8 February 1927

Supplements

- 1 – 16 February 1920
- 2 – 26 July 1923
- 3 – 8 September 1924
- 4 – 6 April 1925
- 5 – 22 June 1925

== Sources ==
- Leach, John Albert (1928). "Review of 'The Birds of Australia' by Gregory M. Mathews". Emu. 27 (3): 211–214. doi:10.1071/MU927211.
- Robin, Libby (2001). The Flight of the Emu: a hundred years of Australian ornithology 1901-2001. Melbourne: Melbourne University Press. ISBN 0-522-84987-3.
- Stone, Witmer (1927). "Recent Literature: Mathews' 'The Birds of Australia'". The Auk. 44 (3): 435–442. doi:10.2307/4074721. JSTOR 4074721.
- Whittell, Hubert Massey (1954). The Literature of Australian Birds: A History and a Bibliography of Australian Ornithology (PDF). Perth: Paterson Brokensha. LCCN 56000760. OCLC 2851290. OL 6194318M. Wikidata Q7747557.
- Illustrations of plates by John Gerrard Keulemans appearing in The birds of Australia Archived 27 October 2020 at the Wayback Machine
