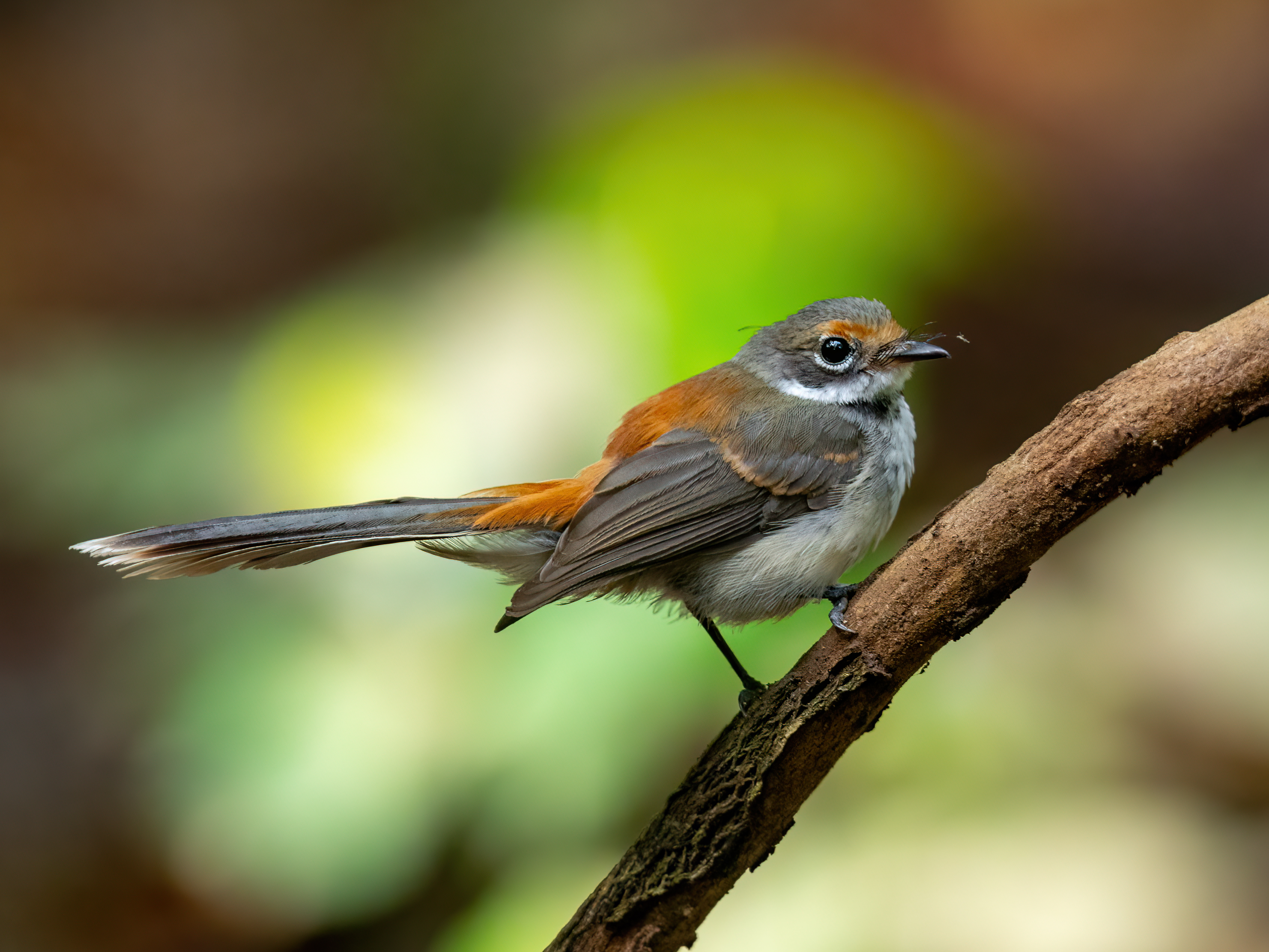

Conservation status
- Least Concern (IUCN 3.1)

Scientific classification
- Kingdom: Animalia
- Phylum: Chordata
- Class: Aves
- Order: Passeriformes
- Family: Rhipiduridae
- Genus: Rhipidura
- Species: R. dryas

Binomial name
- Rhipidura dryas Gould, 1843
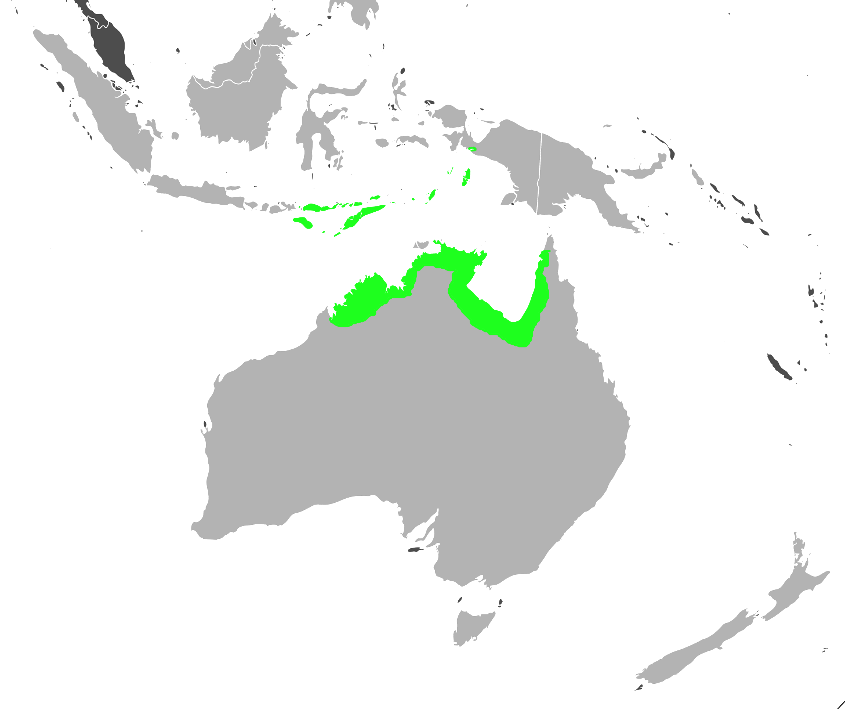
- approximate range

= Arafura fantail =

Species of bird

The Arafura fantail (Rhipidura dryas), sometimes known as the wood fantail, inhabits the Lesser Sunda Islands, the northern coast of Australia from the Kimberley to the western side of the Cape York Peninsula, including subcoastally in the Top End of the Northern Territory, and southern New Guinea. It is similar to the rufous fantail, from which it has been split taxonomically but, apart from minor overlap in the eastern Moluccas, their geographic ranges are discrete. It is generally duller than the rufous fantail with the rufous colouration more restricted.

== Subspecies ==
Two subspecies are recognised:

- R. d. streptophora Ogilvie-Grant, 1911 – coastal central south New Guinea
- R. d. dryas Gould, 1843 – northeast Western Australia to northwest Queensland and satellites (coastal northwest, central north Australia)

== Habitat ==
The species is typically found in mangroves and other coastal woodland, alongside primary and secondary low-level forest. The species tolerates a wide altitudinal range, from near sea level to around 2000 metres in the Timor part of its range.

== Related species ==
- R. rufidorsa
- - R. brachyrhyncha
  - - R. dahli
    - - R. teysmanni
      - - R. dryas
        - R.rufifrons

Consensus phylogeny tree of a clade within the fantails (Rhipiduridae) according to Nyári et al. (2009)

It is one of over 60 member species of the genus Rhipidura, commonly known as the fantails. Within the genus it belongs to a group of five closely related species: R. rufidorsa, R. brachyrhyncha, R. dahli, R. teysmanni and R. rufifrons. A molecular phylogeny study showed the rufous fantail (Rhipidura rufifrons) to be its closest relative.

It forms a superspecies with R. rufifrons and R. semirubra, and all three are often considered conspecific. All are part of a larger species group that also includes R. teysmanni, R. superflua, R. dedemi, R. opistherythra, R. lepida, R. rufidorsa, R. dahli, R. matthiae and R. malaitae.
