= Frederick Nutter Chasen =

English zoologist

- Born: 1896; Norfolk, East Anglia, England
- Died: 12 February 1942 (aged 45–46); Singapore
- Occupations: Ornithologist, Zoologist
- Spouse(s): Agnes H McCullock (1926–1938); Kathleen Matilda Michael
- Children: Heather Jean Chasen; Christine Elizabeth Chasen

Frederick Nutter Chasen (1896 – 13 February 1942) was an English zoologist.

Chasen was born in Norfolk, England. He was apprenticed to Frank Leney of the Norwich Museum in 1912, joining the Museum as a full-time employee in 1919. Between these dates Chasen fought in the First World War (1914–1918) with the Norfolk Yeomanry. His first published work of ornithology was derived from observations he made of the birds of the Struma Plain in north-east Greece made during the time of this conflict.

In 1921, Chasen was appointed Assistant Curator of the Raffles Museum in Singapore. He later was promoted to Director in 1932 in succession to Cecil Boden Kloss. Between these years he traveled extensively in the region on behalf of the Museum and became an authority on Southeast Asian birds and mammals as a result of the many scientific publications he authored in key ornithological journals such as the Ibis and Journal für Ornithologie. He was an even more prolific author for local and regional journals – Treubia and his own institutions's Bulletin of the Raffles Museum.

Chasen was married to Agnes (née McCullock), with whom he had two daughters, Elizabeth and actress Heather. The pair later divorced, and Chasen remarried.

From 1929, Chasen was responsible for continuing the work of H.C. Robertson. Robinson had been the Director of the Federated States of Malaya Museums until his retirement in 1926. During his career he had become an expert in the region's ornithology which he put to use preparing a monumental reference work, The Birds of the Malay Peninsula. He managed to complete two volumes of this work before his death in 1929. Chasen took up the task of using Robertson's notes to finish the third and fourth volumes. A fifth volume was in preparation at the time of his own death.

In 1934, he was made a Corresponding Fellow of the American Ornithologists' Union and five years later a British Empire member of the British Ornithologists' Union.

When the Pacific War broke out, the British authorities in Singapore established a Department of Information with Victor Purcell, previously the government's Protector of Chinese, as Director-General. According to Purcell, Chasen approached him soon afterwards, asking to be appointed to the department on top of his museum duties. Purcell accepted the offer and Chasen became his personal assistant, valued for his training and experience in the organisation of exhibitions.

His work for the Department of Information meant that Chasen was evacuated on one of the last boats leaving the doomed colony. He sailed on the H.M.S. Giang Bee, a converted coastal steamer, which was attacked by the Japanese in the Java Sea on the 13 February 1942. Chasen was numbered among those who died in the attack.

== Legacy ==
Frederick Nutter Chasen is commemorated in the scientific name of a venomous snake native to Borneo, Garthius chaseni.
