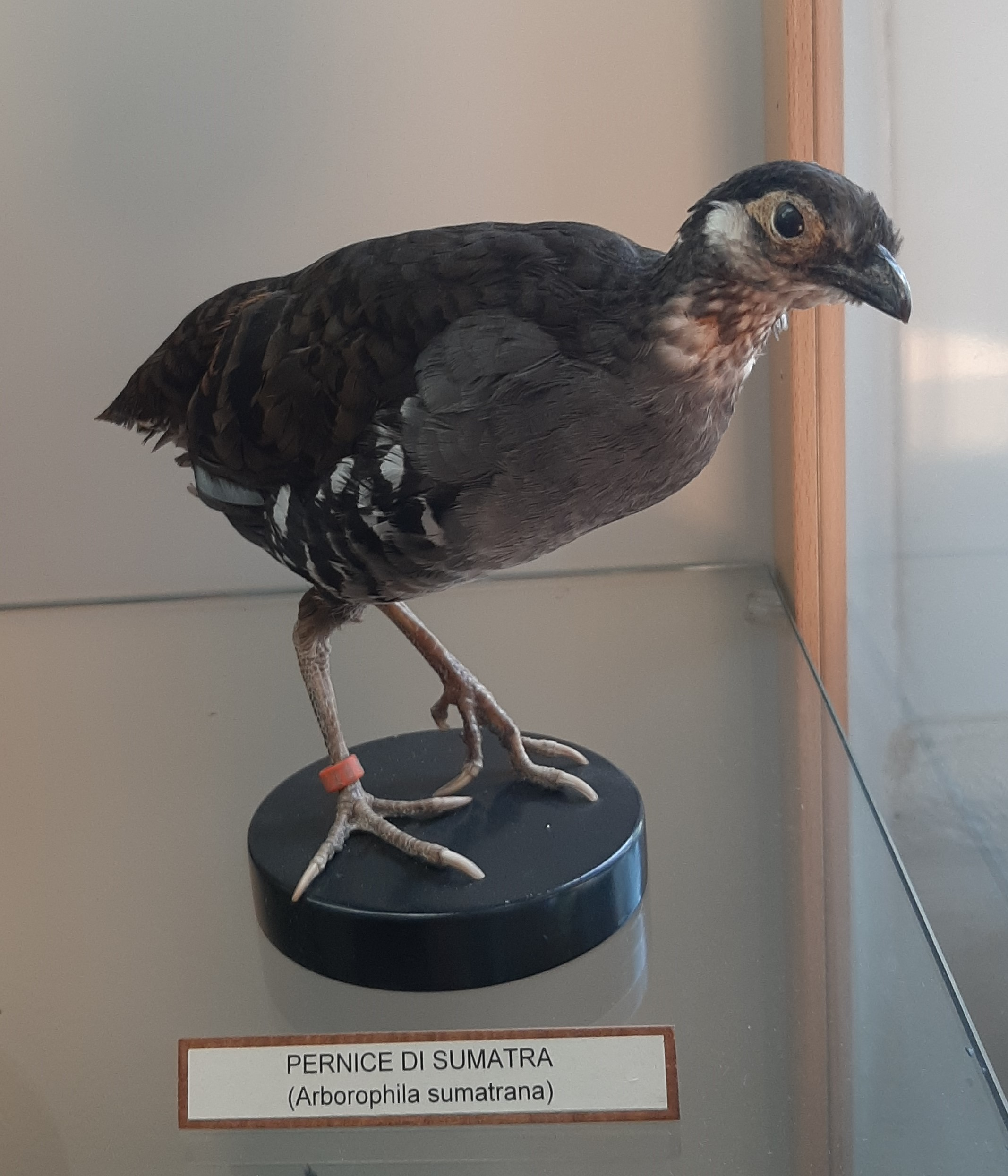

Conservation status
- Least Concern (IUCN 3.1)

Scientific classification
- Kingdom: Animalia
- Phylum: Chordata
- Class: Aves
- Order: Galliformes
- Family: Phasianidae
- Genus: Arborophila
- Species: A. sumatrana

Binomial name
- Arborophila sumatrana Ogilvie-Grant, 1891

= Sumatran partridge =

Species of bird

The Sumatran partridge, or Sumatran hill partridge, (Arborophila sumatrana) is a bird species in the family Phasianidae. It is found in highland forest in central Sumatra, Indonesia. It is sometimes treated as a subspecies of the grey-breasted partridge (A. orientalis).
