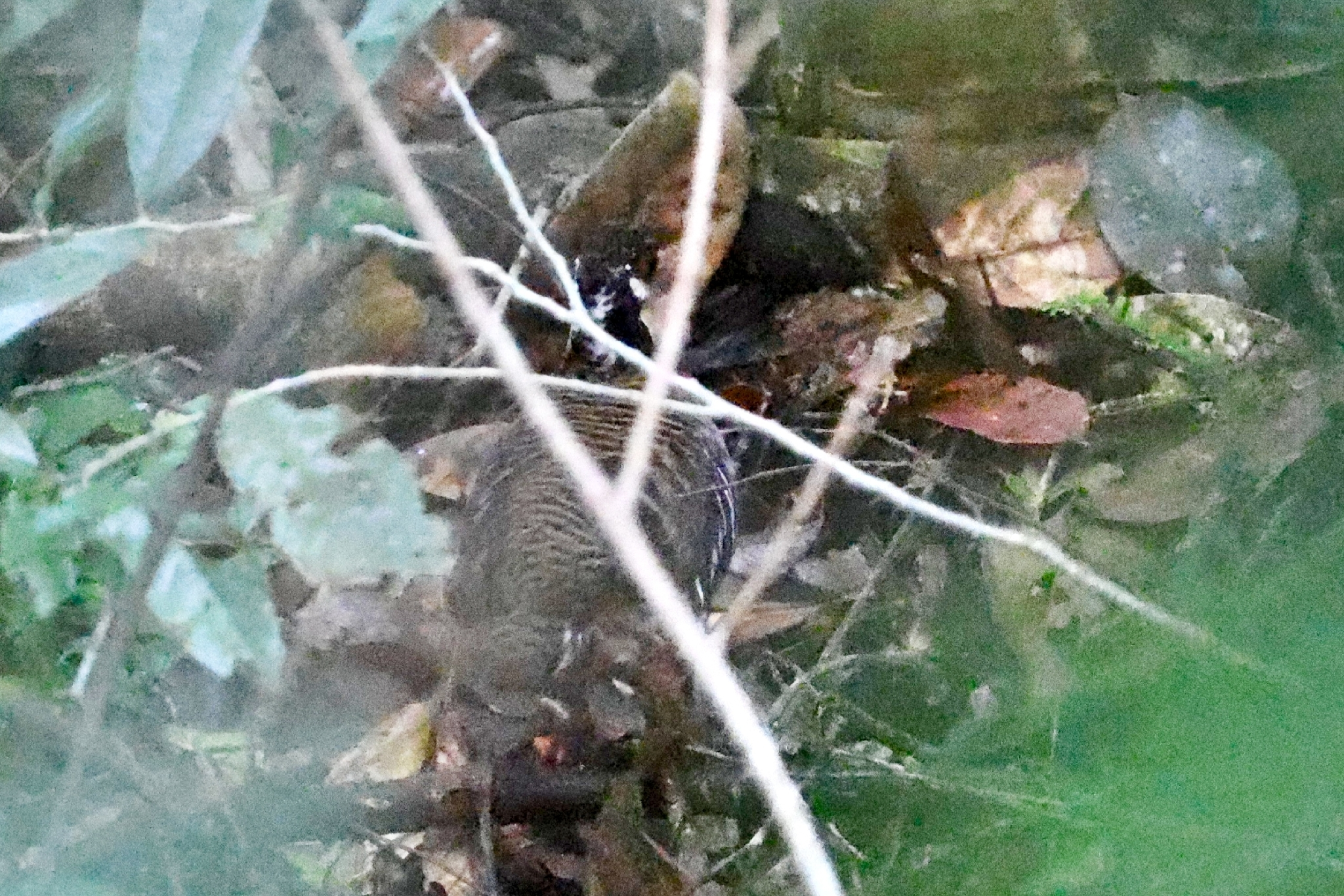

Conservation status
- Least Concern (IUCN 3.1)

Scientific classification
- Kingdom: Animalia
- Phylum: Chordata
- Class: Aves
- Order: Galliformes
- Family: Phasianidae
- Genus: Arborophila
- Species: A. rolli

Binomial name
- Arborophila rolli (Rothschild, 1909)

Synonyms
- Arborophila orientalis rolli

= Roll's partridge =

Species of bird

Roll's partridge (Arborophila rolli) is a bird species in the family Phasianidae. It is found in highland forest in northern Sumatra, Indonesia. It is sometimes treated as a subspecies of the grey-breasted partridge.
