= James F. Cockerell =

James Frederick Cockerell (25 November 1847 – 19 December 1897) was an Australian collector of specimens for zoölogists, active in Australia, Indonesia, and Pacific Islands, after 1867. He provided collections for the South Australian Museum after the 1880s, while residing at Mildura, Victoria.

An expedition made to the Solomon Islands in 1878 produced specimens that resulted in the descriptions of the birds made by Edward P. Ramsay between 1879 and 1882. Part of this collection is held at the Australian Museum, and the rest was acquired by six other museums. James Cockerell visited Western Australia from 1879 to early 1880, and the bird skins that he collected were acquired by the British Museum. Further collections were made in Aru Islands in 1872, Samoa, Fiji and the Bismarks, 1875–1876.

Cockerell was born in Sydney to John T. Cockerell (1828?–1907), also a collector, and Jane Cockerell. He died in hospital in Albany, Western Australia, aged 30, and was survived by his wife and two children.
