= Herbert C. Robinson =

Museum director and ornithologist

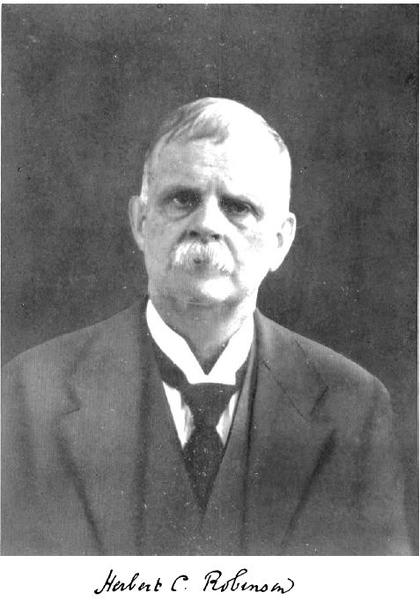

Herbert Christopher Robinson (4 November 1874 – 20 May 1929) was a British zoologist and ornithologist. He is principally known for conceiving and initiating the major ornithological reference The Birds of the Malay Peninsula.

Robinson was born in Liverpool in a large family that included several brokers, barristers and academics. He was educated at Marlborough College, and received a scholarship for the Royal School of Mines though he was unable to complete his studies there due to a lung infection. He lived in Davos briefly for health. He joined New College, Oxford where an uncle was bursar, but gave up in 1896. An attempted collecting expedition to New Guinea was again abortive because of illness. He worked at the Liverpool Museum with Henry Ogg Forbes before visiting the Federated Malay States where he later accepted the Directorship of Museums. In 1901–1902 he, with Nelson Annandale, led an expedition to Perak and the Siamese Malay States; Robinson wrote a report on tiger beetles. He was curator of the Selangor Museum in Kuala Lumpur from 1903 to 1926, becoming director of fisheries in 1906. In 1905 he led an expedition to Gunung Tahan, becoming the first European to reach the summit. He made a return visit to England in 1920. He retired from the civil service in 1926 and began preparing a comprehensive illustrated account of the birds of the Malay Peninsula. Of this work he produced the first two volumes and much of the manuscript of a third before he died in a nursing home in Oxford after a long illness. His work was eventually completed in five volumes by others including F. N. Chasen who died in 1941. The fifth and last volume was published in 1975, written by Lord Medway and David Wells.

Acknowledgement of his contributions to zoology include a species of bat, Nyctimene robinsoni, named by Oldfield Thomas when describing the specimens Robinson had obtained at Cooktown in eastern Australia. Robinson is commemorated in the scientific names of two species of lizards: Malayodracon robinsonii and Tropidophorus robinsoni.
