= Herbert Goodchild =

British illustrator

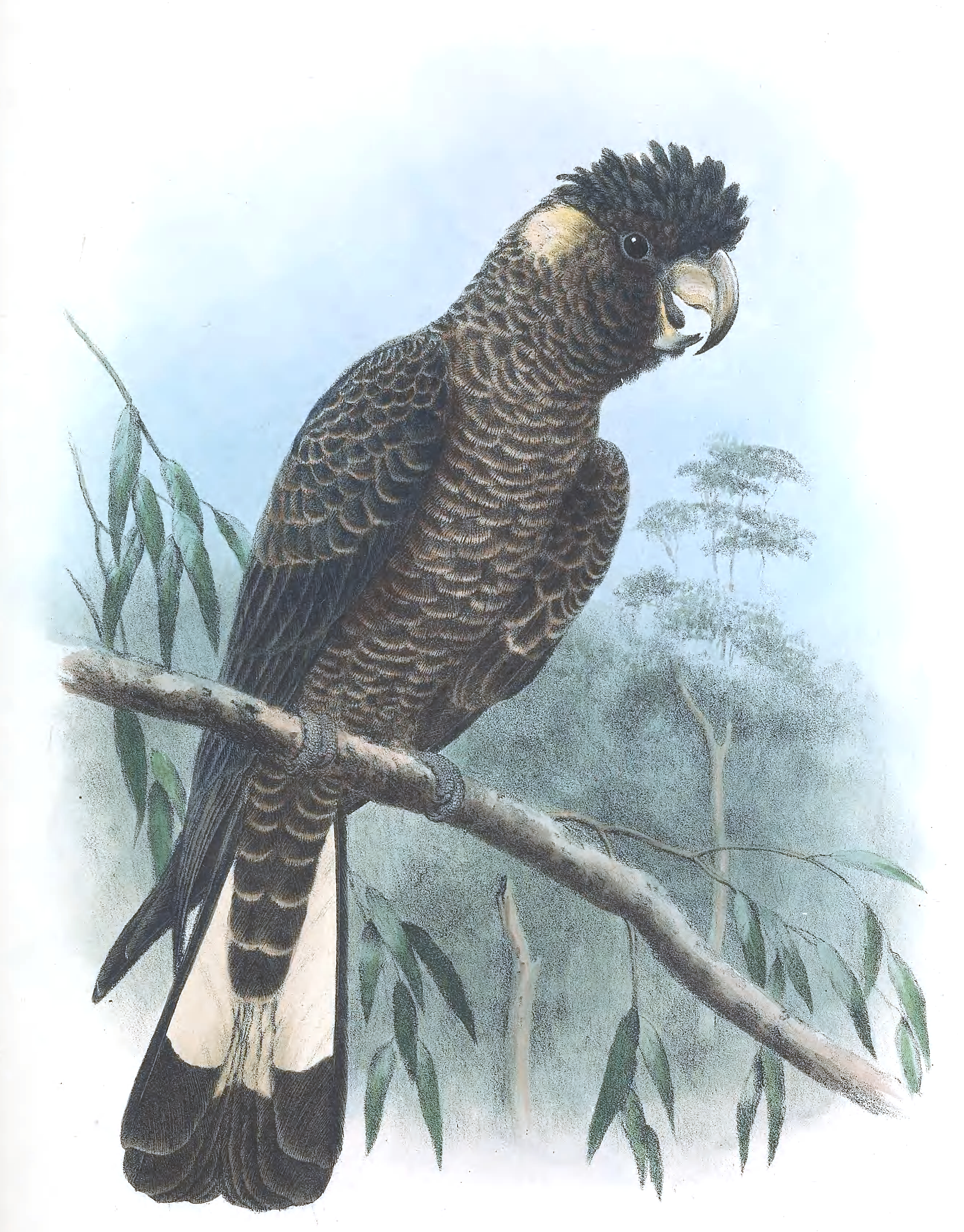
white-tailed black cockatoo, 1916–17

Herbert Goodchild was an early twentieth century illustrator of birds. He was born in 1873 at Cumberland and died sometime around 1919. Goodchild was employed to supply artwork for a fully illustrated and multi-volume work, Birds of Australia. by Gregory Mathews. This followed the death of John Keulemans in 1912. His works appeared in several other publications, but Goodchild's talents were regarded as overlooked (Olsen, 2015) in the field of ornithological illustration.
