= Hendrikus Albertus Lorentz =

Dutch explorer and diplomat (1871–1944)

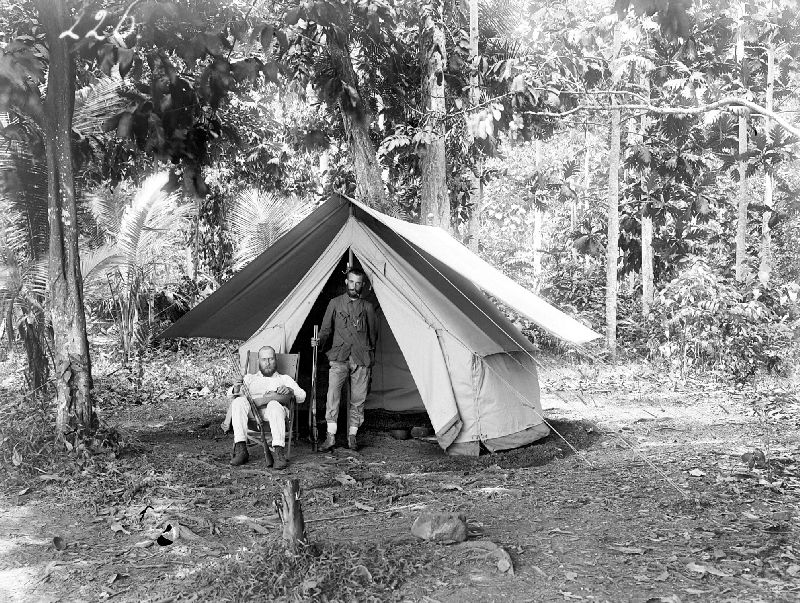
Hendrikus Albertus Lorentz (left) and Lieven Ferdinand de Beaufort, 1903 Wichmann New Guinea expedition

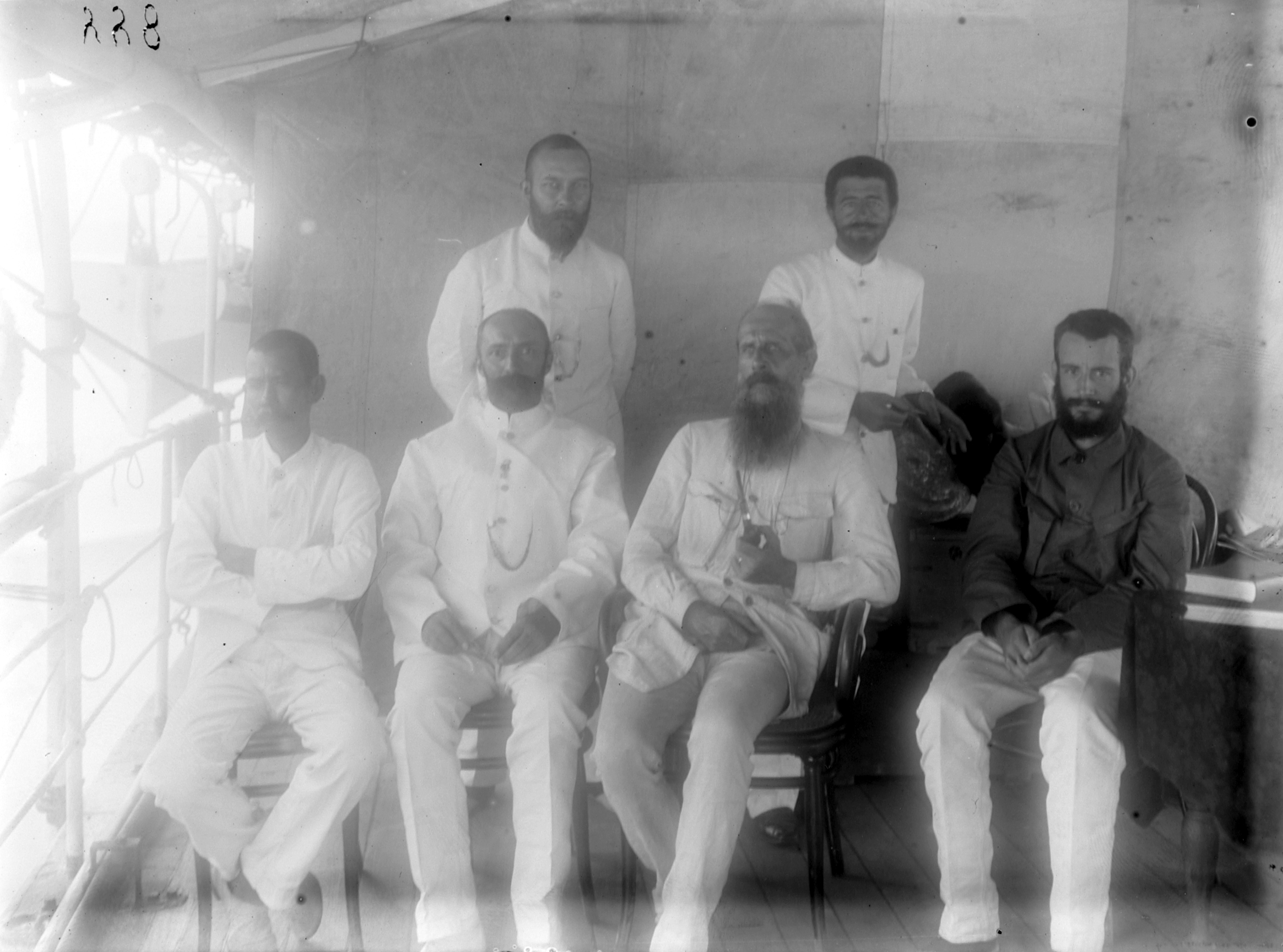
Lorentz (top left) during the 1903 Wichmann New Guinea expedition

Lorentz (left) with a porter crossing the river Ingsim, 1903 Wichmann New Guinea expedition

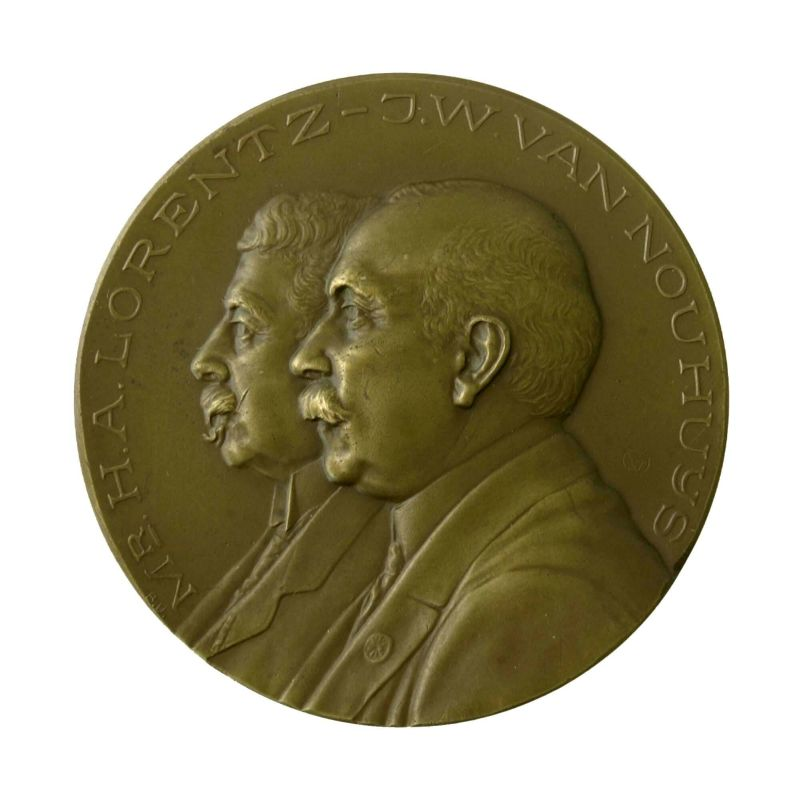
Hendrikus Albertus Lorentz (left) with Jan Willem van Nouhuys (1869–1963) on an honorary medal, 1948

Hendrikus Albertus Lorentz (18 September 1871 – 2 September 1944) was a Dutch explorer in New Guinea and diplomat in South Africa.

He was born to Theodorus Apolonius Ninus Lorentz, a tobacco grower in East Java who had returned to the Netherlands and Marie Soet in 1871. Lorentz studied law and biology at Utrecht University and married Marie Louise Clemence baroness Van Zuylen van Nievelt.

Lorentz participated in three expeditions to Dutch New Guinea, the present-day Indonesian (western) portion of the island of New Guinea. The first was the North New Guinea Expedition in 1903, led by Arthur Wichmann. Lorentz himself led expeditions in 1907 and 1909–1910.

== Places and species named after Lorentz ==
- Lorentz National Park and the Lorentz River (Undir or Unir in Indonesian) in southern New Guinea
- Lorentz catfish and Lorentz's mosaic-tailed rat
- The non-venomous Lorentz's tree snake Dendrelaphis lorentzii (Van Lidth de Jeude, 1911). The holotype was collected at Sabang on the Noordrivier (later renamed the Lorentz River) during Lorentz's third Papuan expedition.

== Collector ==
Lorentz collected indigenous artifacts and bird samples. The latter he sent to the Rijksmuseum van Natuurlijke Historie at Leiden, The Netherlands. Some examples:

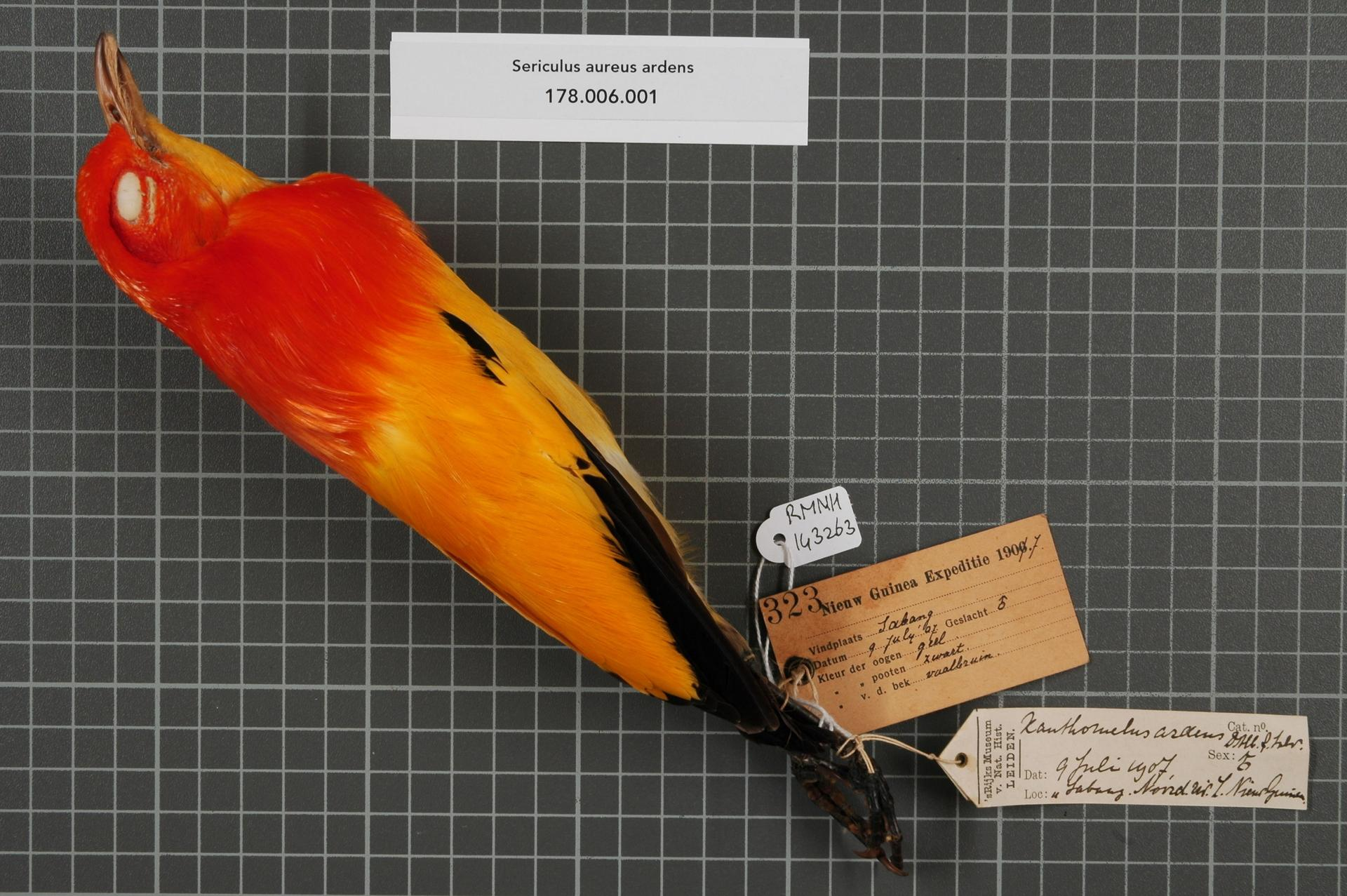
Flame bowerbird (Sericulus ardens) from Southern New Guinea in 1907. Original description Xanthomelus ardens, later subspecies Sericulus aureus ardens.

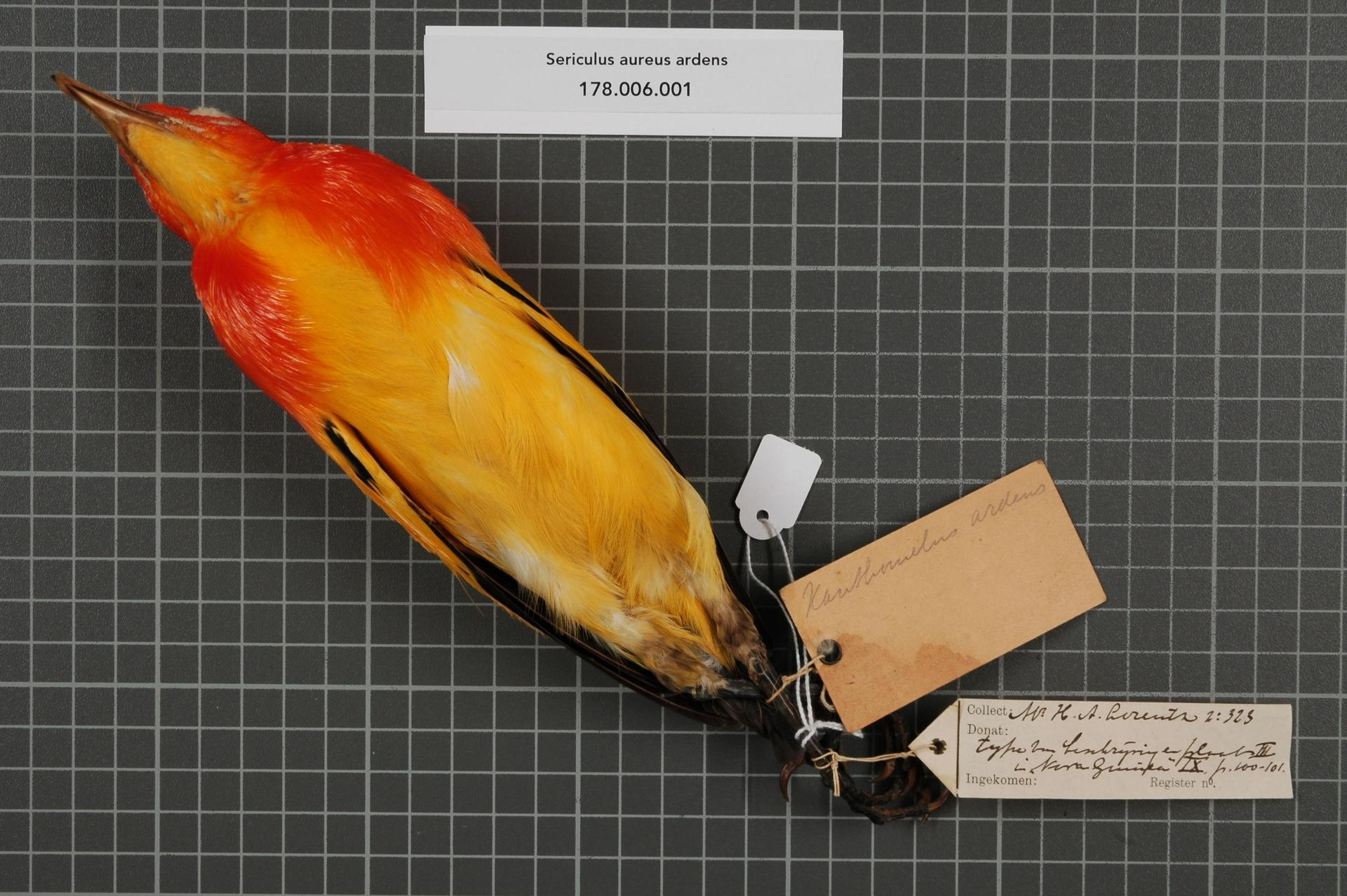
Breast view of the same sample. Flame bowerbird (Sericulus ardens).

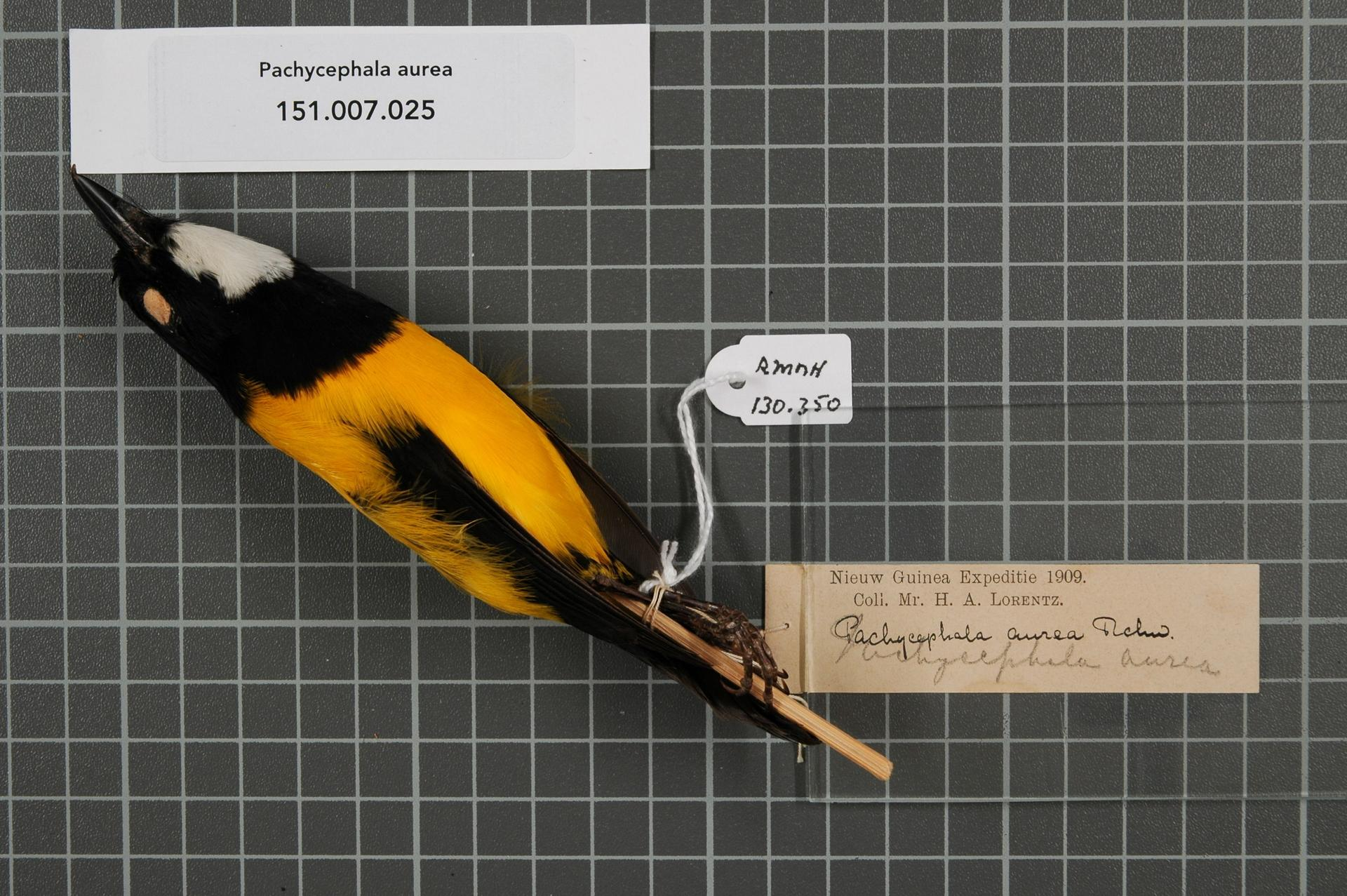
Golden-backed whistler (Pachycephala aurea), New Guinea expedition 1909

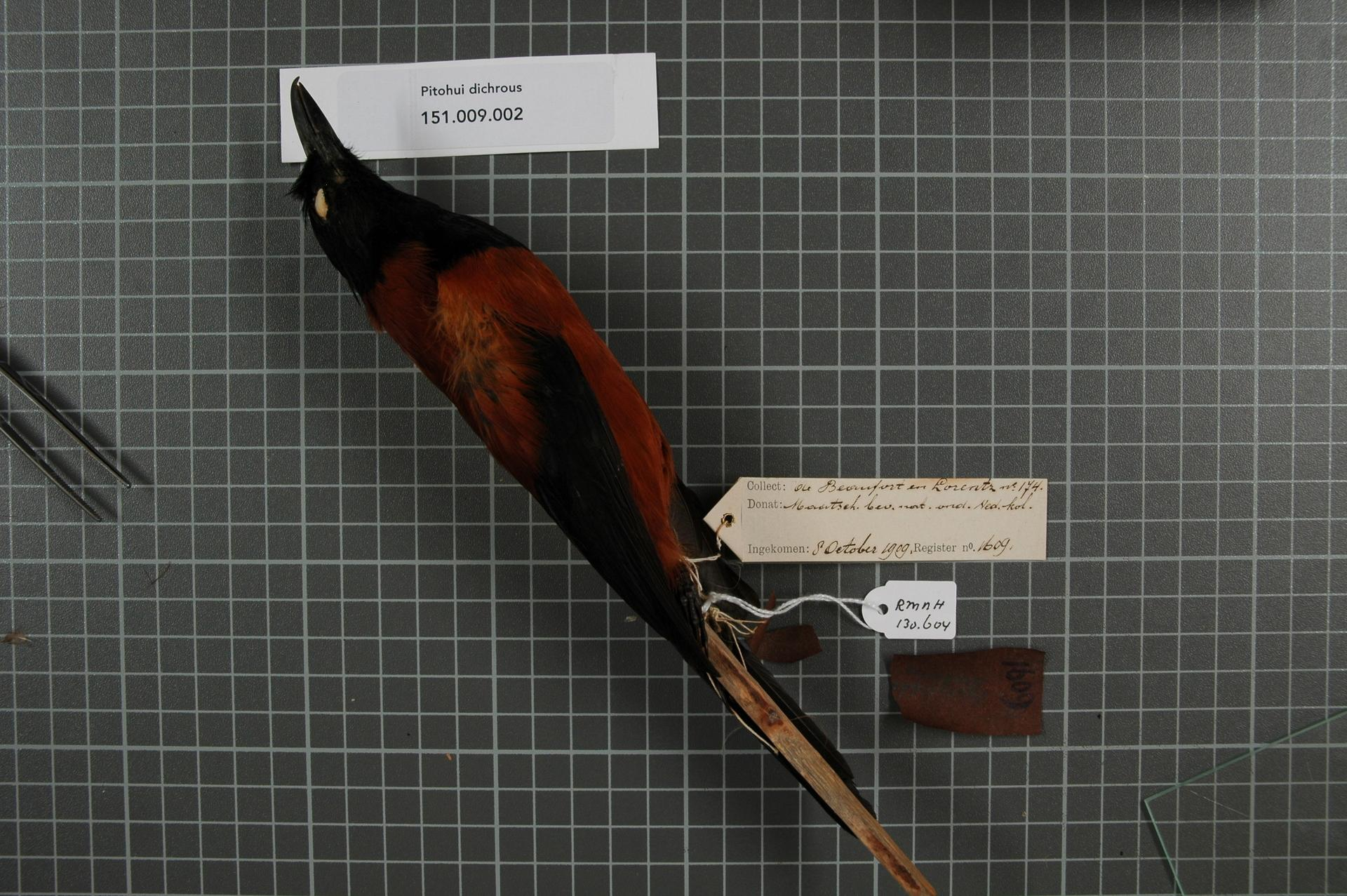
Hooded pitohui (Pitohui dichrous), received 1909

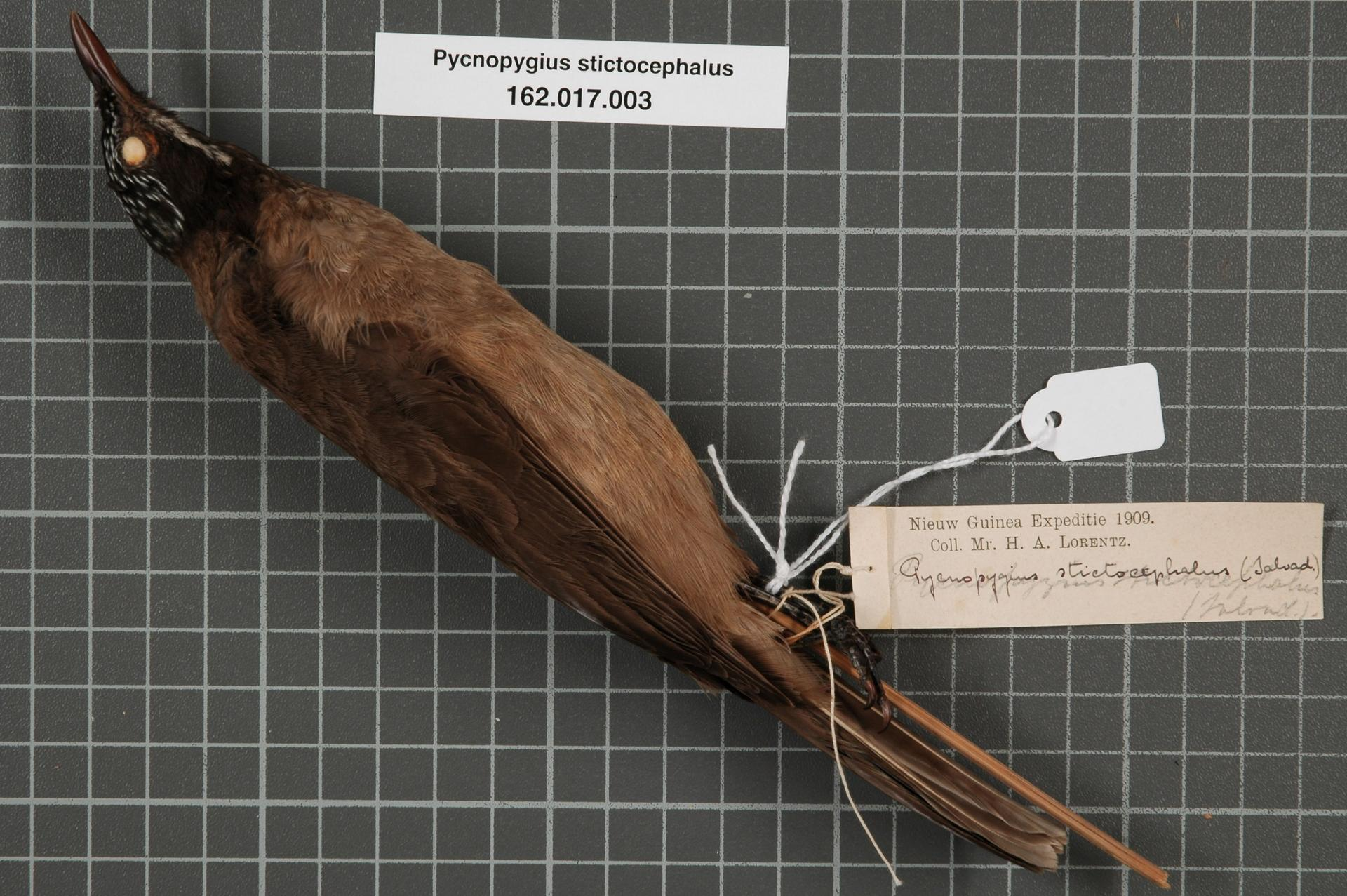
Streak-headed honeyeater (Pycnopygius stictocephalus), New Guinea expedition 1909

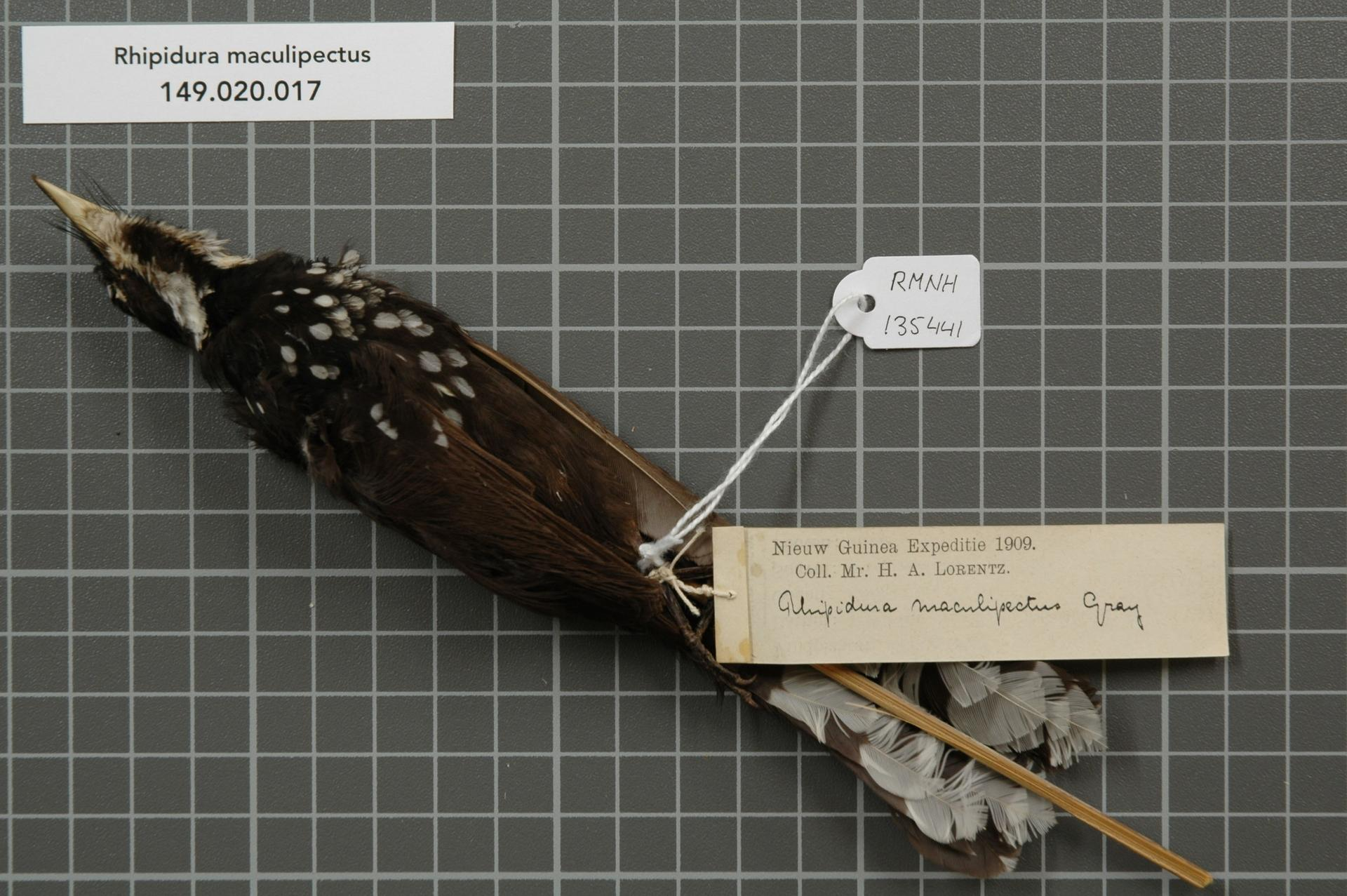
Black thicket fantail (Rhipidura maculipectus), New Guinea expedition 1909

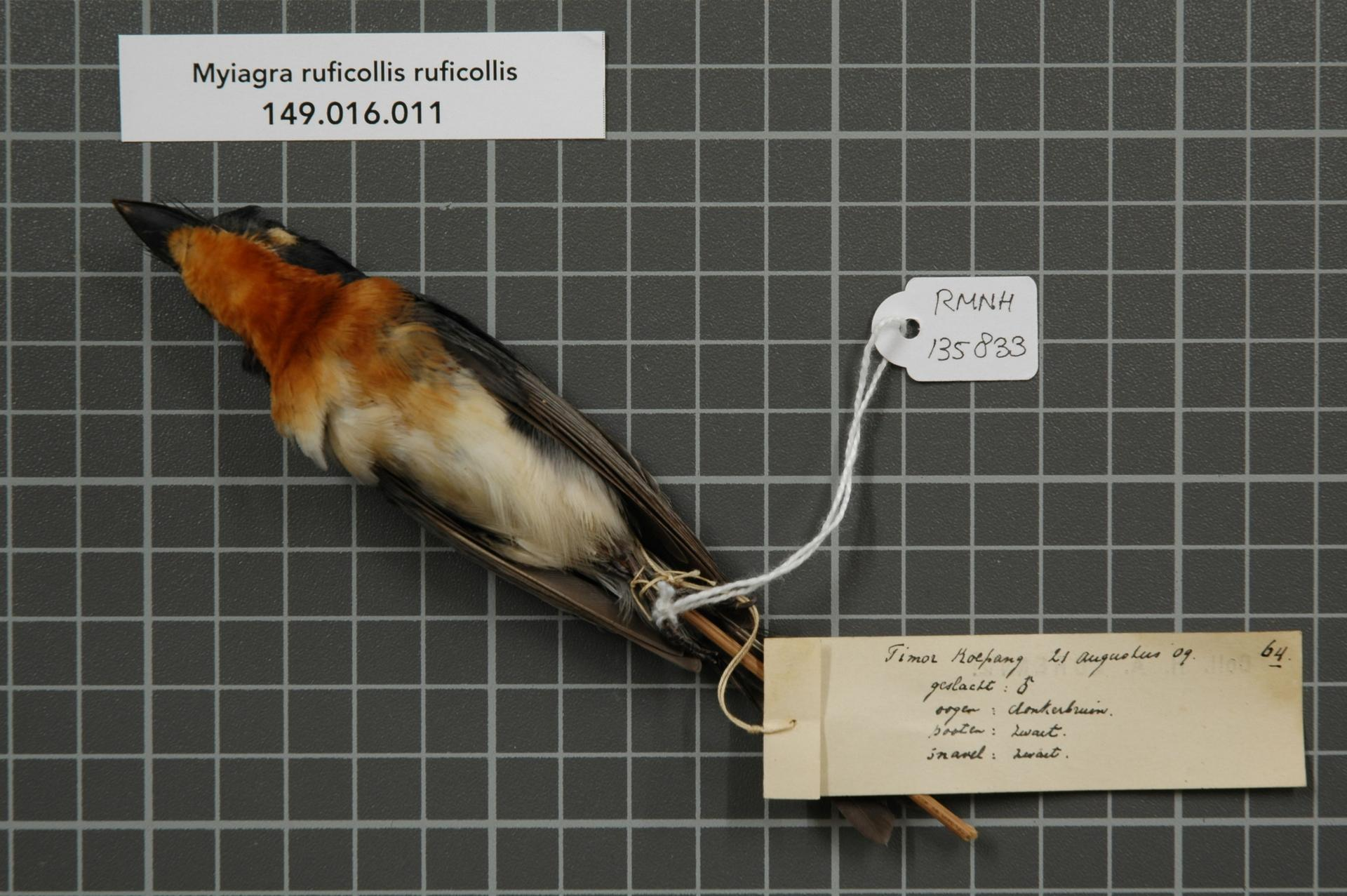
Broad-billed flycatcher (Myiagra ruficollis ruficollis), from Kupang, Timor, 1909

== Publications ==
=== by Lorentz ===
- (in Dutch) Eenige maanden onder de Papoea's. Leiden: E.J. Brill, 1905.
- (in Dutch) Zwarte menschen - witte bergen: verhaal van den tocht naar het sneeuwgebergte van Nieuw-Guinea. Leiden: E.J. Brill, 1913. (Tweede druk 2005, Amsterdam / Antwerpen: Uitgeverij Atlas; met een voorwoord van Tijs Goldschmidt en een inleiding van A.S. Troelstra. ISBN 90 450 05085).

=== by other authors ===
- Ballard, Chris, Steven Vink and Anton Ploeg, Race to the Snow; Photography and the Exploration of Dutch New Guinea, 1907-1936. Amsterdam: KIT Publishers, 2001.
- (in Dutch) Duuren, David van en Steven Vink, 'Hendrikus Albertus Lorentz (1871–1944)', in: David van Duuren, Oceania at the Tropenmuseum. Amsterdam: KIT Publishers, 2011, p. 66.
- (in Dutch) Schepers, J.H.G., In Memoriam mr. H.A. Lorentz. Tijdschrift van het Koninklijk Aardrijkskundig Genootschap 63, 1946, pp. 1–7.
- (in Dutch) Troelstra, Anne, Lorentz in Noord-Nieuw-Guinea, hfdst. 7 in Anne Troelstra (ed), Van Spitsbergen naar Suriname. Amsterdam/Antwerpen: Atlas, pp. 279–302.
