= North New Guinea expedition =

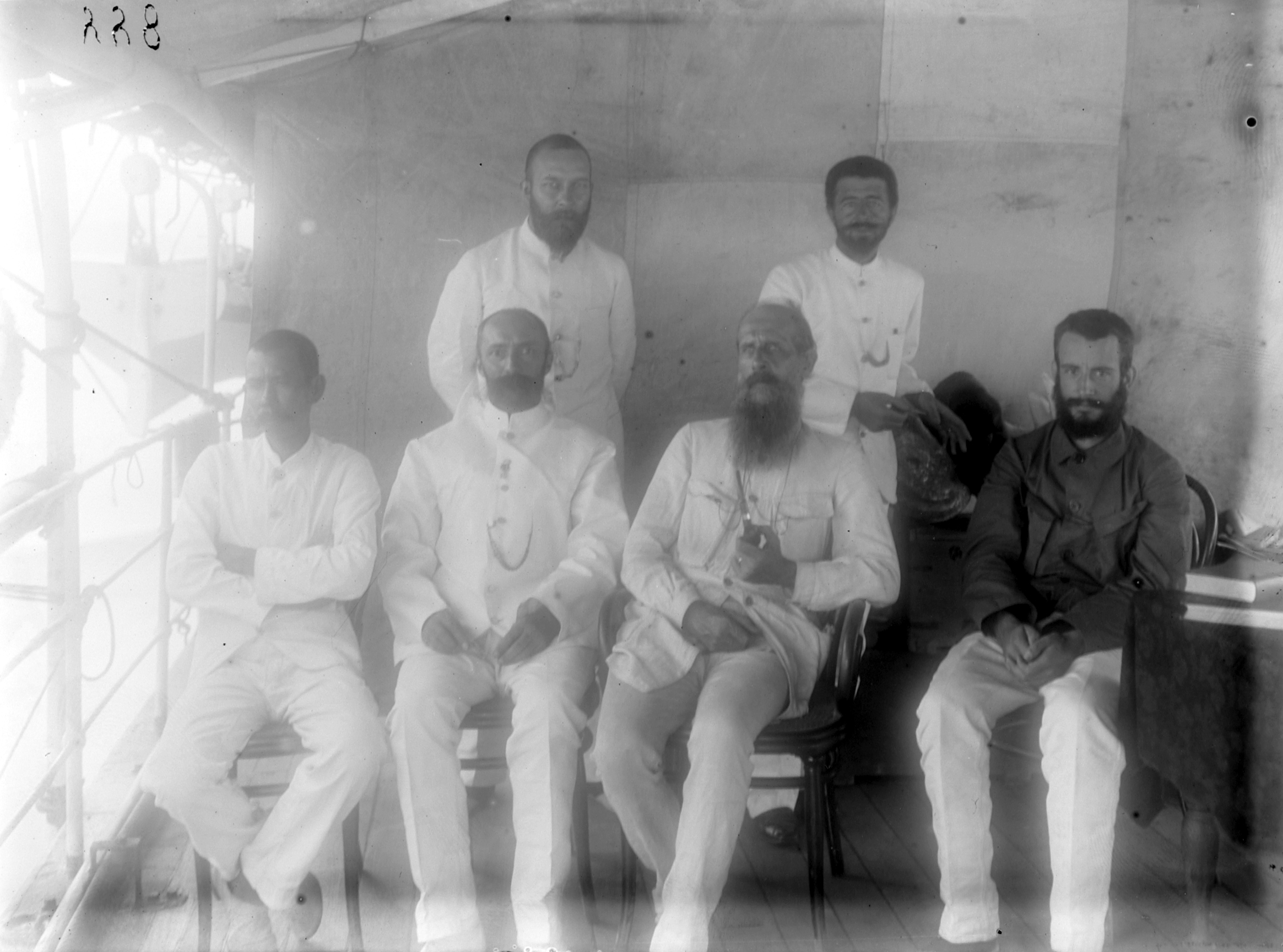
Arthur Wichmann and his expedition member.

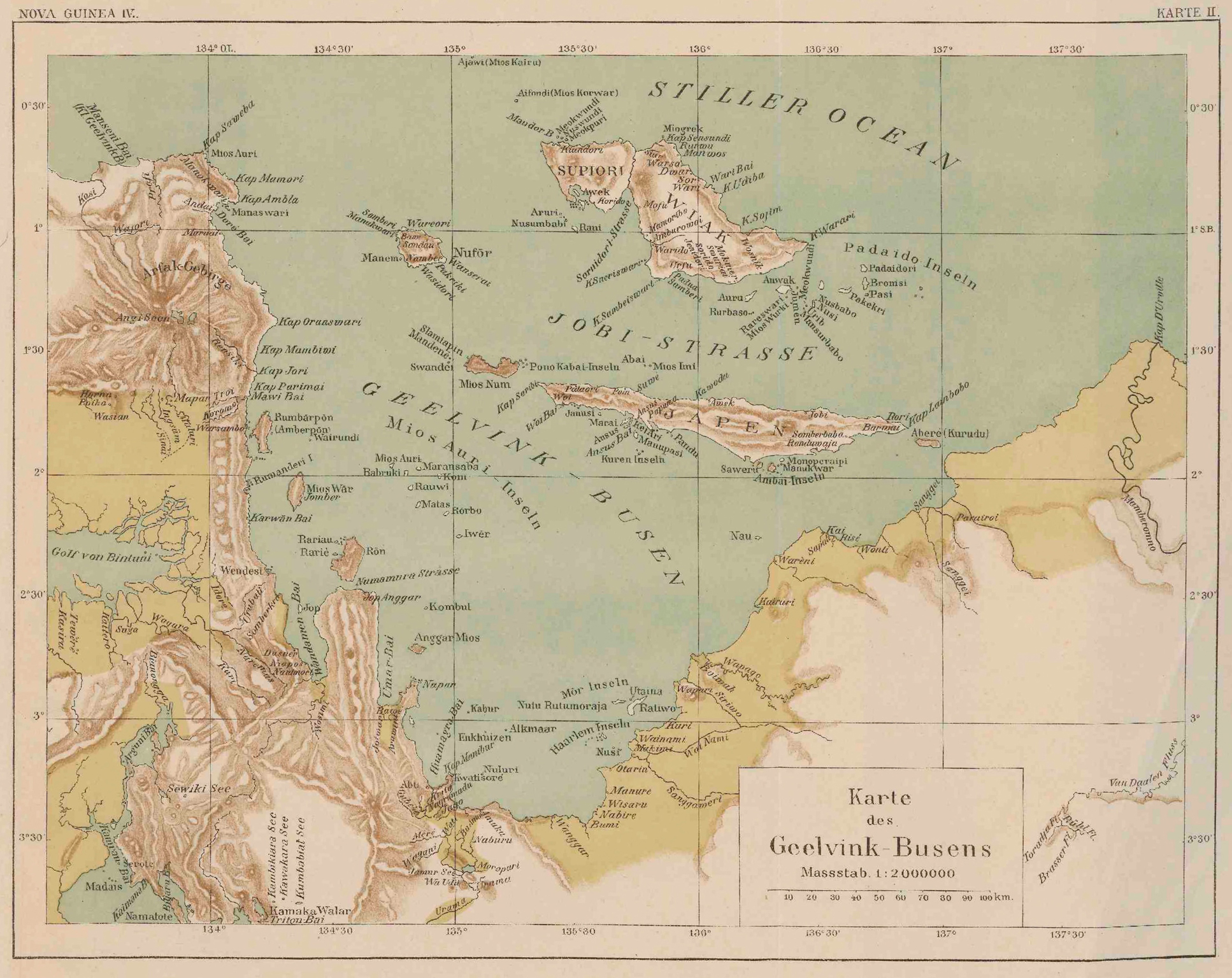
Map of Cenderawasih Bay, explored during the North New Guinea Expedition

The North New Guinea expedition (1903) was a Dutch expedition to the still largely unknown north coast of Dutch New Guinea for the purposes of scientific exploration and to seek exploitable coal resources.

== Literature ==
- Beaufort, L.F. de, Birds from Dutch New Guinea (Nova Guinea 5, boek 3). Leiden 1909, pp. 389–421.
- Lorentz, H.A., Eenige maanden onder de Papoea's. Leiden: E.J. Brill, 1905.
- Sande, G.A.J. van der, Ethnography and Anthropology (Nova Guinea 3). Leiden, 1906.
- Schmeltz, J.D.E., Gids voor de tentoonstelling van de ethnographische verzameling der Noord-Nieuw-Guinea-Expeditie 1903. Leiden: S.C. van Doesburgh, 1907.
- Wichmann, A., Bericht über eine im Jahre 1903 ausgeführte Reise nach Neu-Guinea. (Nova Guinea 4). Leiden, 1917.
