= H. A. Lorentz =

H. A. Lorentz may refer to:

- Hendrik Antoon Lorentz (1853–1928), Dutch physicist who shared the Nobel Prize in 1902
- Hendrikus Albertus Lorentz (1871–1944), Dutch explorer and diplomat
