= Rutten =

Rutten may refer to:

== Places ==
- Rutten, Belgium, a village in Belgium, noted as the location of the Hamal Castle
- Rutten, Netherlands, a town in Noordoostpolder, Flevoland, Netherlands

== People with the surname ==
- Bas Rutten (born 1965), Dutch mixed martial artist and kickboxer
- Ben Rutten (born 1983), Australian rules footballer
- Fred Rutten (born 1962), Dutch football player and coach
- Gerard Rutten (1902–1982), Dutch movie director
- Gwendolyn Rutten (born 1975), Belgian politician
- Louis Rutten (1884–1946), Dutch geologist
- Marguerite Rutten (1898–1984), French archaeologist and Assyriologist
- Martin Rutten (1876–1944), Belgian civil servant
- Martin Gerard Rutten (1910–1970), Dutch geologist and biologist, son of Louis
- Martin-Hubert Rutten (1841–1927), Belgian bishop
- Peter Johannes Rutten (1864–1953), Dutch politician
- Renaud Rutten (born 1963), Belgian actor
- Theo Rutten (1899–1980), Dutch politician

== See also ==
- Rutte (disambiguation)
