= Rute (disambiguation) =

"Rute" may refer to:

- Rute, a municipality of Córdoba, Spain
- Rute, Gotland, a settlement on the Swedish island of Gotland
- Rüte, a municipality of Appenzell Innerrhoden, Switzerland
- Rute (music), a type of drum beater
- Rute (length), the German word for the rod
- Rute Plateau, a plateau in Lower Carniola, Slovenia
- Juan Rute (fl. 16th century), English sailor and explorer
- Rute Gunnay, a Star Wars character

== See also ==
- Rutte (disambiguation)
- Rutebeuf, a French trouvère
