= Rutte (surname) =

Rutte is a Dutch surname originally meaning "son of Rut". Notable people with this surname include:

- Arno Rutte (born 1972), Dutch politician
- Mark Rutte (born 1967), Dutch politician, Secretary General of NATO, and then–Prime Minister of the Netherlands
- Mary L. Rutte, sponsor of the USS Fillmore (APA-83)
- Joseph Rutte, a Quaker and business partner of Richard Tapper Cadbury

== See also ==
- First Rutte cabinet, government cabinet of the Netherlands (2010–2012)
- Second Rutte cabinet, government cabinet of the Netherlands (2012–2017)
- Third Rutte cabinet, government cabinet of the Netherlands (2017–2022)
- Fourth Rutte cabinet, government cabinet of the Netherlands (2022–2024)
- Rutten (disambiguation)
