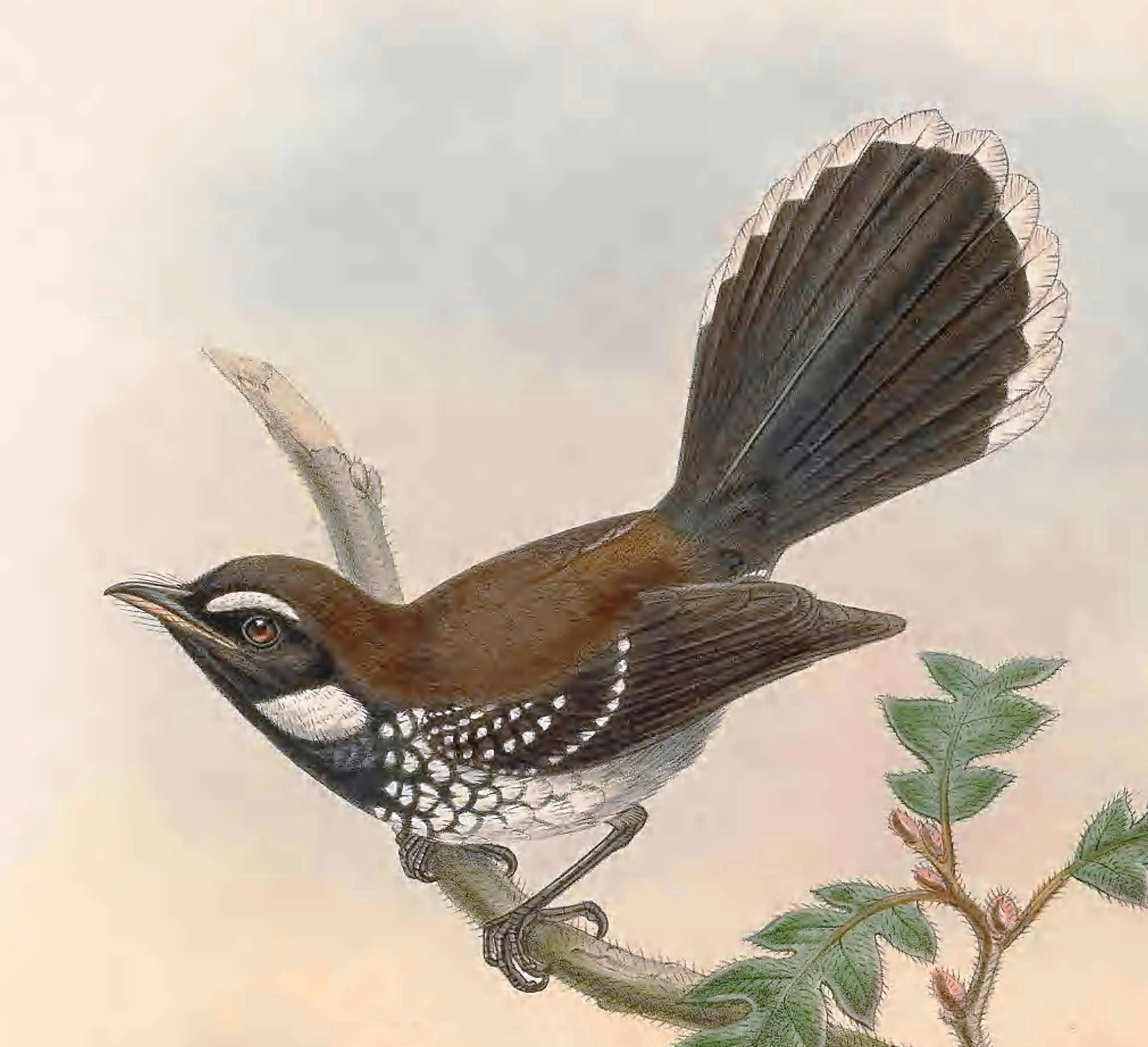

Conservation status
- Least Concern (IUCN 3.1)

Scientific classification
- Kingdom: Animalia
- Phylum: Chordata
- Class: Aves
- Order: Passeriformes
- Family: Rhipiduridae
- Genus: Rhipidura
- Species: R. leucothorax

Binomial name
- Rhipidura leucothorax Salvadori, 1874
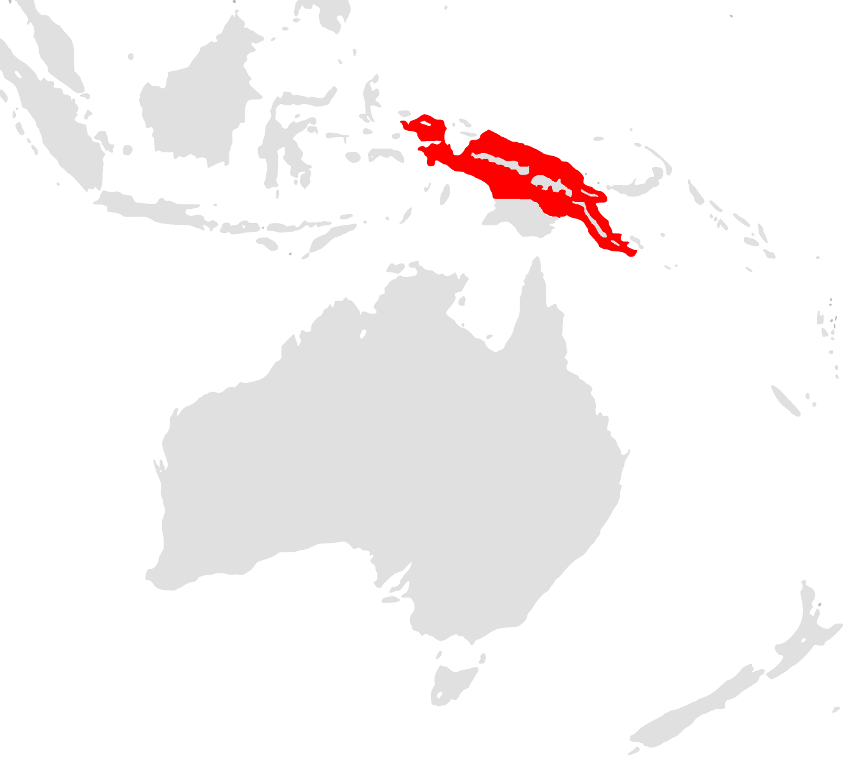

= White-bellied thicket fantail =

Species of bird

The white-bellied thicket fantail (Rhipidura leucothorax) is a species of bird in the family Rhipiduridae. This species is one of 47 in the genus Rhipidura. It is found in New Guinea. Its natural habitats are subtropical or tropical moist lowland forests and subtropical or tropical mangrove forests.

== Description ==
Medium-sized long-tailed bird (18cm, 19-19.7g). The plumage is blackish with a white belly, white spots on the chest, wings, side of the neck and a white tip of the tail. There is as well a short white stripe above the eye. The legs are dark - from dark gray to black. The tail is often upturned and fanned out. Males and females are similar. Juveniles are similar to adults, but browner in color, with spots on the breast and totally black bill.

White-bellied thicket fantail is similar to Black thicket fantail (R. maculipectus), but is differed by its white breast (which is reflected in its name). This species is also similar to Sooty thicket fantail (R. threnothorax) but that one has no white tip of the tale.

== Habitats and behavior ==
The majority of fantails are strong fliers, and some species can undertake long migrations, but white-bellied thicket fantail as well as the other thicket fantails (sooty thicket fantail and black thicket fantail) are very weak fliers, and need to alight regularly.

The birds of this species are very secretive and it is rather difficult to notice them. Inhabits the forest thickets of plains and hills, at altitudes up to 1350 m above sea level. They live in a variety of biotopes: in shrubs, thickets bordering watercourses, forests and light forests, near forest swamps and along the edges of mangroves and in the gardens as well.

Like other fantails, white-bellied thicket ones are entomophages. They are feeding usually within a few meters of the ground. Approximately 40% of the prey is harvested, 20% is caught on the fly.

The voice is a descending sound followed by a high ringing note «juu-wee!».

The nest is a small cup with a «tail». It is built of dried reeds or smth like that, lined with roots bound with spiders' webs. The nests are placed in the branch forks at a height of about 0.5 m. The clutch consists of 2 eggs 16-19 * 13-14.5 mm in size. The eggs are white, with blurry browny and lilac-gray spots, located mostly in the middle.

== Taxonomy ==
According to IOC there are 2 recognised subspecies. In alphabetical order, these are:

- R. l. leucothorax Salvadori, 1874 — west of SE part of New Guinea and also: Kairiru and Muschu islands at the north of New Guinea
- R. l. episcopalis Ramsay, EP, 1878 — east part of SE of New Guinea
