= Rutte (disambiguation) =

Mark Rutte (born 1967) is the 14th secretary general of NATO and former prime minister of the Netherlands (2010–2024).

Rutte may also refer to:

- Rutte (surname), a Dutch surname (including a list of people)
- Rutte, Tarvisio, an Italian parish
- Rutte, a Holland gin

== See also ==
- Rutten (disambiguation)
