= Clara Wichmann =

German-Dutch anarchist feminist (1885–1922)

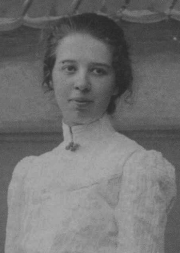
- Born: Clara Gertrud Wichmann; 17 August 1885; Hamburg, German Empire
- Died: 15 February 1922 (aged 36); The Hague, Netherlands
- Other name: Clara Meijer-Wichmann
- Occupations: Lawyer, writer
- Movement: Feminism, Anarchism
- Spouse: Jonas Meijer (m. 1921–1922)
- Children: Hetty Clara Passchier-Meijer (daughter)
- Parents: Carl Ernst Arthur Wichmann (father); Johanna Theresa Henriette Zeise (mother)
- Relatives: Erich Wichmann (brother)

Clara Gertrud Wichmann (17 August 1885 – 15 February 1922) was a German–Dutch lawyer and anarchist feminist activist, who became a leading advocate of criminal justice reform and prison abolition in the Netherlands.

== Biography ==
In 1885, Clara Wichmann was born in Hamburg, the daughter of Carl Ernst Arthur Wichmann and Johanna Theresa Henriette Zeise. In 1902, she studied philosophy and the works of Georg Wilhelm Friedrich Hegel. She went on to study law between 1903 and 1905, during which she first became critical of the criminal justice system and started to push for its reform.

She developed a theory of criminal law that advocated for the abolition of prisons and punitive justice, which she elaborated in her thesis, graduating as a Doctor of Law in 1912. In 1914, she was employed by the Dutch Statistics Office as a lawyer, but was soon promoted to deputy director of the Social Welfare Institute. She collaborated with Jacques de Roos on compiling criminal statistics, and in 1919, she succeeded de Roos as head of the Judicial Statistics Department.

During her studies, she had joined the Dutch feminist movement in 1908, co-founding the Nederlandsche Bond voor Vrouwenkiesrecht (English: Dutch Society for Women's Suffrage) and working as its secretary until 1911. She was also on the board of the Vereeniging tot Verbetering van den Maatschappelijken en den Rechtstoestand der vrouw in Nederland (English: Association for the Improvement of the Social and Legal Status of Women in the Netherlands). She went on to participate in the opposition to World War I and became an anarchist in 1918. She also studied the history of feminism and, from 1914 to 1918, co-authored the encyclopaedia De vrouw, de vrouwenbeweging en het vrouwenvraagstuk (English: Women, the women's movement and the women's issue) with Cornelia Werker-Beaujon.

She became an activist in the prison abolition movement and campaigned against punitive justice, which she described as "a blot of backwardness, coarseness, shallowness and harshness." In 1919, she established the Comité van Actie tegen de bestaande opvattingen omtrent Misdaad en Straf (English: Committee of Action against the existing views on Crime and Punishment) and co-founded the Bond van Revolutionair Socialistische Intellectuelen (English: Union of Revolutionary Socialist Intellectuals). On 21 March 1920, she gave a public speech in which she asserted that crime was rooted in social injustice, and that equitable social relations would make almost all criminal acts disappear. That same year, she co-founded the Bond van Religieuze Anarcho-Communisten (English: Union of Religious Anarcho-Communists). She wrote numerous articles for the organisation's newspaper, De Vrije Communist (English: The Free Communist), in which she called for strike actions as a means of non-violent resistance against social injustice.

In 1921, she married Jonas Meijer, a pacifist conscientious objector. The couple were close to the Dutch anarchists Albert de Jong and Bart de Ligt. Wichmann died in 1922, a few hours after giving birth to her daughter Hetty Clara Passchier-Meijer.

== Legacy ==
Jonas Meijer continued to publish Wichmann's work after her death. Though an atheist, he was Jewish by birth and survived the Second World War by going into hiding in Amsterdam. Hetty Clara survived the war and helped hide a Jewish family in Leiden whilst working with the resistance. After the war she became a doctor and until her death remained actively involved in the publishing and archiving of her mother's work. In 1987, the Clara Wichmann Institute, which advocated for women's rights, was opened in her name. In 2005, the institute studied the issue of positive discrimination, or discrimination against women on religious grounds, and its relationship with international treaties on gender equality. That same year, Ellie Smolenaars published Passie voor vrijheid, a biography on Wichmann.

== Selected works ==
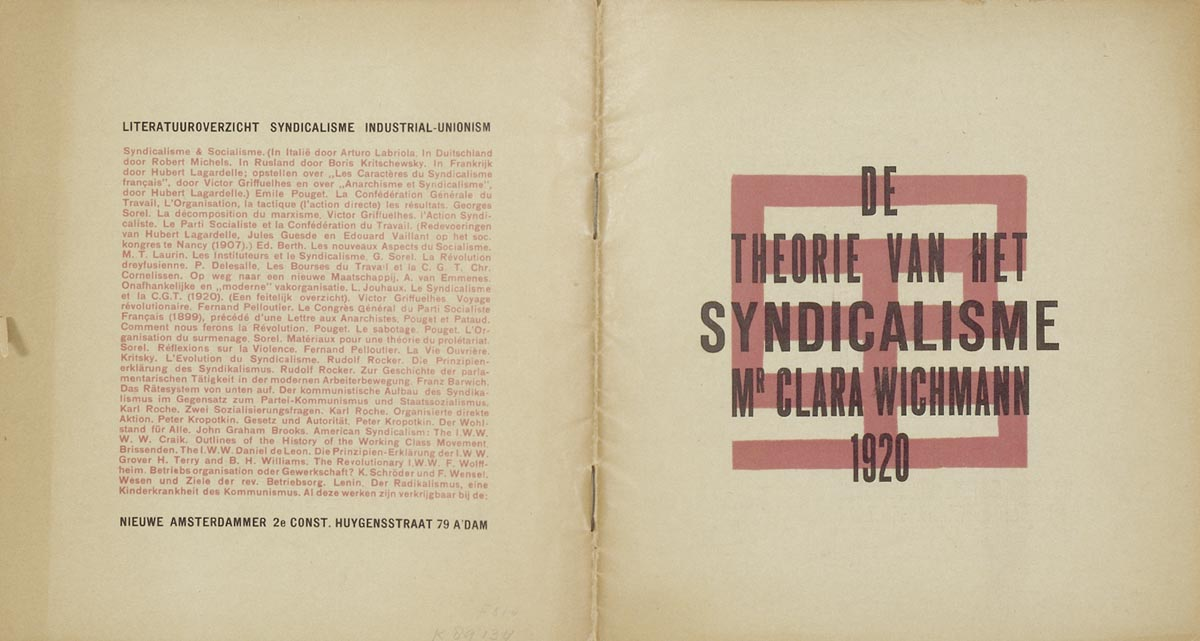
De theorie van het syndikalisme, design by Theo van Doesburg (1920).

- Wichmann, Clara; van den Bergh van Eysinga-Elias, Juliette (1913). De vrouw in Nederland voor honderd jaar en thans (in Dutch). Amsterdam: Maatschappij voor Goede en Goedkoope Lectuur. OCLC 779058713.
- ————————; Werker-Beaujon, Cornelia M.; Werker, W.H.M., eds. (1914–1918). De vrouw, de vrouwenbeweging en het vrouwenvraagstuk: encyclopaedisch handboek (in Dutch). Amsterdam: Elsevier. OCLC 781595790.
- ———————— (1917). Inleiding tot de philosophie der samenleving (in Dutch). Haarlem: De Erven F. Bohn. OCLC 905784833.
- ———————— (1917). De vrouw en de vredesbeweging in verband met de ontwikkeling der wereldbeschouwing (in Dutch). The Hague: Nederlandsch Comité van Vrouwen voor Duurzamen Vrede. OCLC 64895013.
- ———————— (1920). Het Russische huwelijks- en familierecht (in Dutch). Amsterdam: De Nieuwe Amsterdammer. OCLC 173230983.
- ———————— (1920). De theorie van het syndicalisme (in Dutch). Amsterdam: De Nieuwe Amsterdammer. OCLC 173230967.
- ———————— (1920). Misdaad, straf en maatschappij (in Dutch). Blaricum: De Waelburgh. OCLC 173230982.

Posthumously published

- Wichmann, Clara (1922). Die Grausamkeit der herrschenden Auffassung über Verbrechen und Strafe (in German). Berlin: Der freie Arbeiter. OCLC 72259776.
- ———————— (1923). Mensch en Maatschappij (in Dutch). Arnhem: Uitgevers Maatschappij van Loghum Slaterus en Visser. OCLC 81797642.
- ———————— (1924). Bevrijding (in Dutch). Arnhem: Uitgevers Maatschappij van Loghum Slaterus en Visser. OCLC 81280389.
- ———————— (1930). Misdaad, straf en maatschappij (in Dutch). Utrecht: Erven J. Bijleveld. OCLC 37885483.
- ———————— (1936). Vrouw en Maatschappij (in Dutch). Utrecht: Verlag Bijleveld. OCLC 781595791.

== See also ==
- Anarchism in the Netherlands
