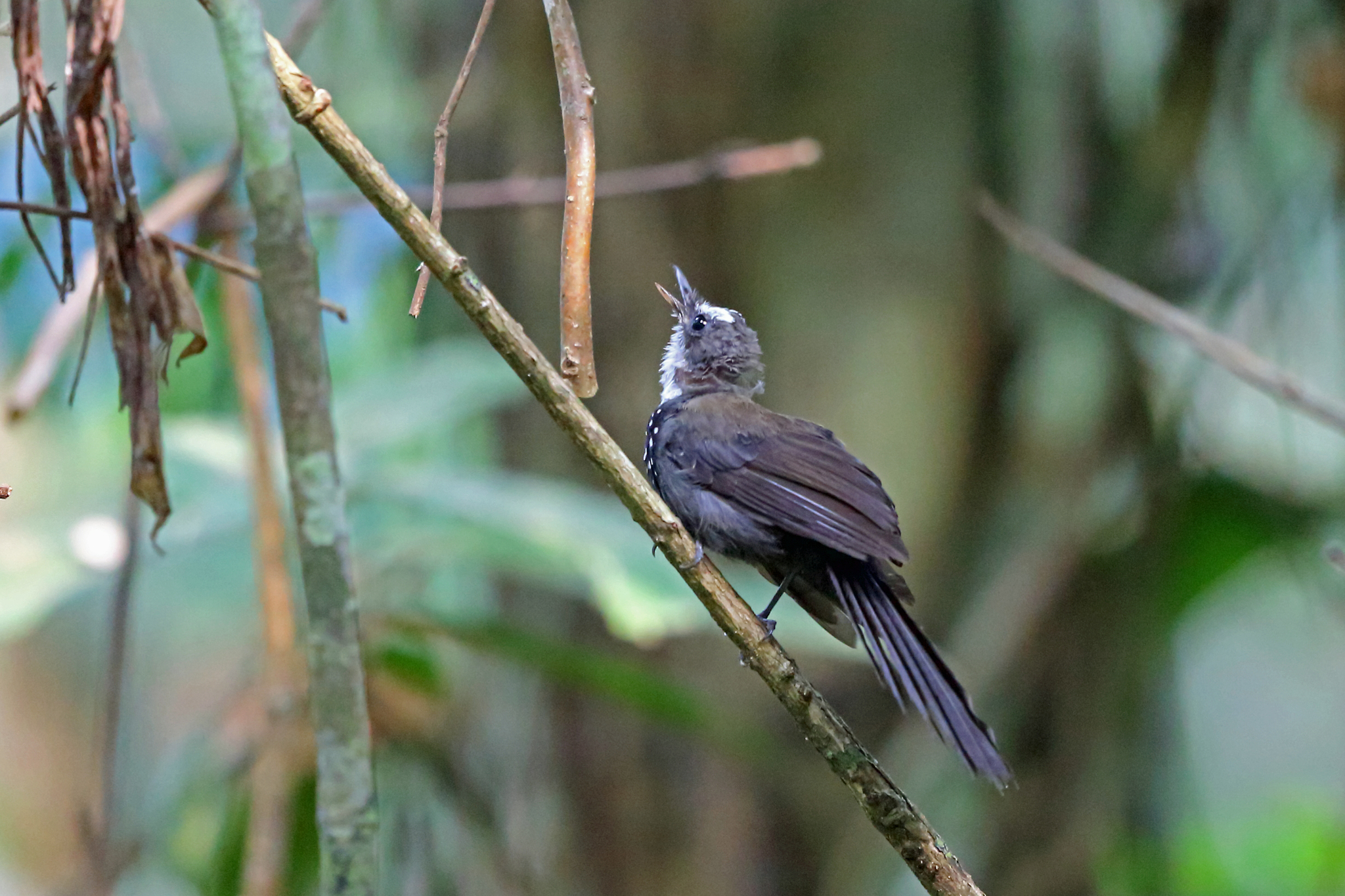

Conservation status
- Least Concern (IUCN 3.1)

Scientific classification
- Kingdom: Animalia
- Phylum: Chordata
- Class: Aves
- Order: Passeriformes
- Family: Rhipiduridae
- Genus: Rhipidura
- Species: R. threnothorax

Binomial name
- Rhipidura threnothorax Müller, 1843
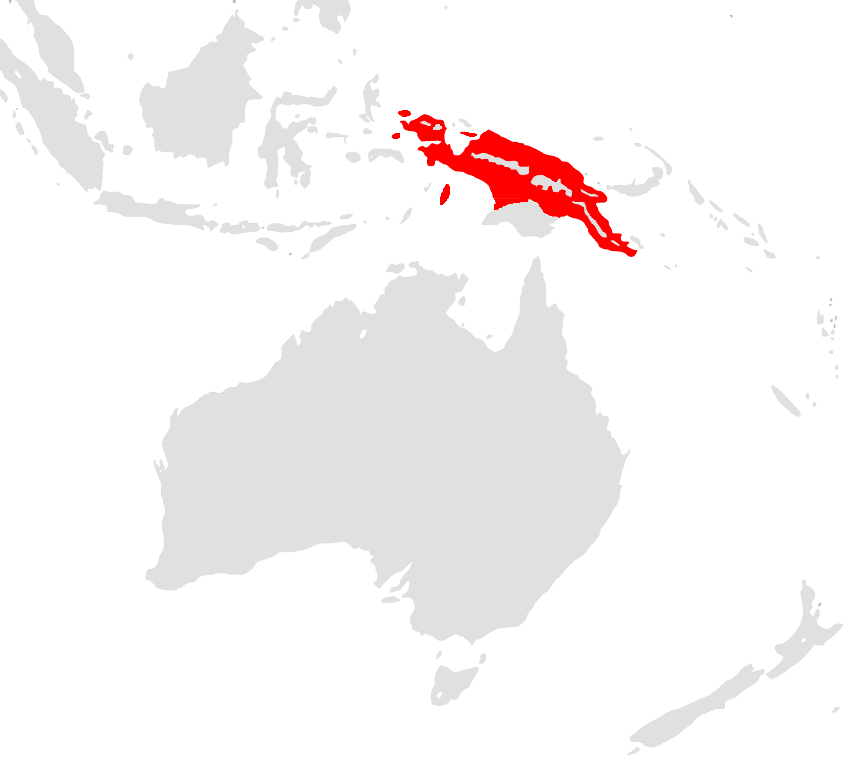

= Sooty thicket fantail =

Species of bird

The sooty thicket fantail (Rhipidura threnothorax) is a species of bird in the family Rhipiduridae. It is found in New Guinea.

== Habitats and behavior ==
The majority of fantails are strong fliers, and some species can undertake long migrations, but sooty thicket fantail as well as the other thicket fantails (white-bellied thicket fantail and black thicket fantail) are very weak fliers, and need to alight regularly.

Its natural habitat is subtropical or tropical moist lowland forests.

== Taxonomy ==
According to IOC there are 2 recognised subspecies. In alphabetical order, these are:

- R. t. fumosa Schlegel, 1871 — Yapen (Geelvink Bay, NW of New Guinea)
- R. t. threnothorax Müller, S, 1843 — Raja Ampat Islands (NW of New Guinea), Aru Islands (SW of New Guinea) and New Guinea
