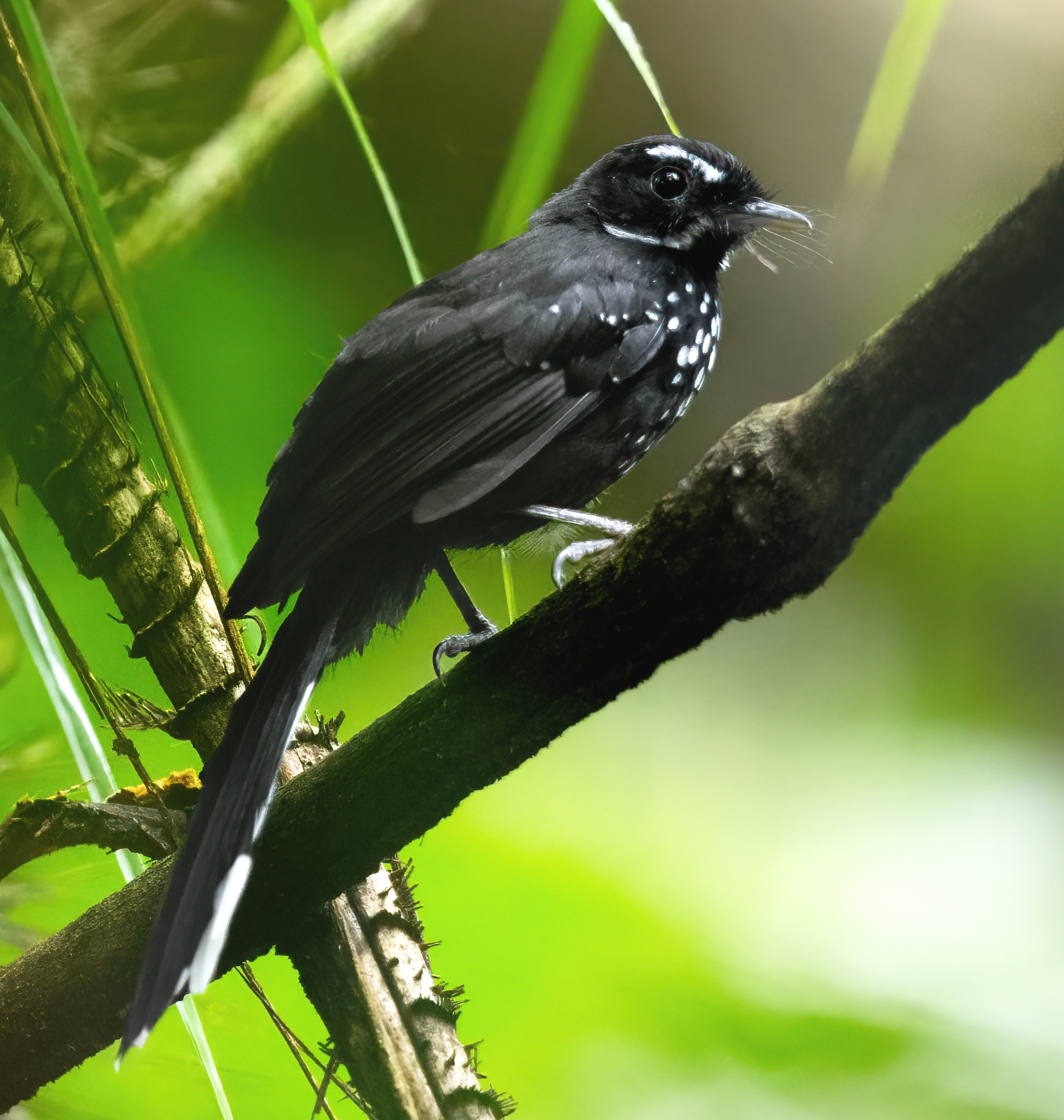
- In Central Province, Papua New Guinea

Conservation status
- Least Concern (IUCN 3.1)

Scientific classification
- Kingdom: Animalia
- Phylum: Chordata
- Class: Aves
- Order: Passeriformes
- Family: Rhipiduridae
- Genus: Rhipidura
- Species: R. maculipectus

Binomial name
- Rhipidura maculipectus Gray, 1858
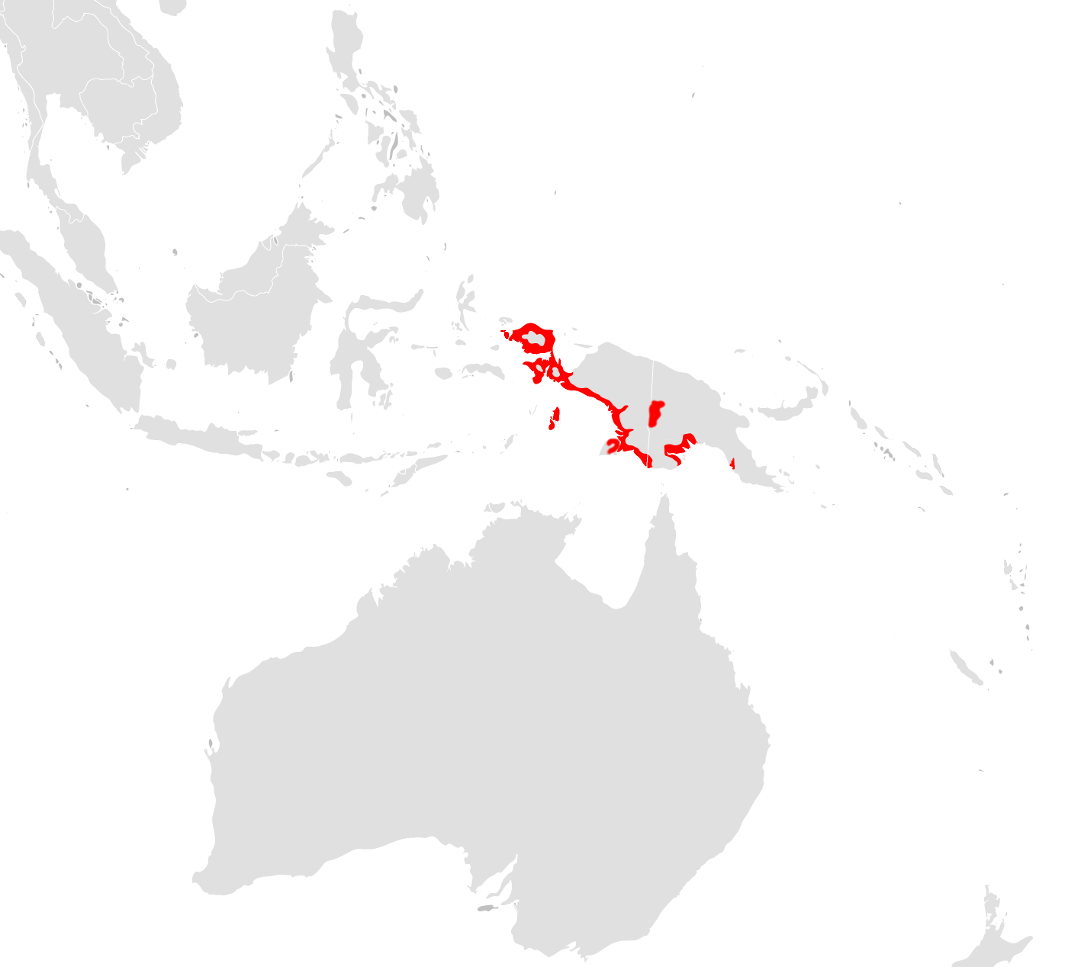
- resident range

= Black thicket fantail =

Species of bird

The black thicket fantail (Rhipidura maculipectus) is a species of bird in the family Rhipiduridae. It is found in the Aru Islands and New Guinea. This species is one of 47 in the genus Rhipidura.

== Description ==
This is a medium-sized, long-tailed bird measuring 18-19 cm and weighing 18-19 g. The plumage is blackish with white spots on the chest and wings and a white tip to the tail. There is besides a short white stripe above the eye and white spot on the side of the neck. The tail is often lifted and fanned out. The iris is dark brown, the beak is black with pinkish underside. Males and females are similar but females have fewer spots and are paler on the abdomen. Juveniles are sooty black all over except for an indistinct white supraorbital spot and white tips on the tail feathers.

The black thicket fantail is similar to the White-bellied thicket fantail (R. leucothorax), but the latter differs in its white belly (as reflected by its name). This species is also similar to the Sooty thicket fantail (R. threnothorax) which has no white tip to the tail.

== Habitats and behavior ==
The majority of fantails are strong fliers, and some species can undertake long migrations, but black thicket fantails as well as the other thicket fantails (sooty thicket and white-bellied thicket fantails) are very weak fliers, and need to alight regularly.

Birds of this species are very secretive and it is rather difficult to observe them. Their natural habitats are subtropical or tropical moist lowland forests and subtropical or tropical mangrove forests.

Like other fantails, black thicket fantails are entomophages. They usually feed within 1-2 meters from the ground. They catch insects on the fly, by means of horizontal sallies from a low perch.

The voice is a rising, ringing, metallic song followed by a «wee-chuv!».

== Citations ==
=== References ===
- "Black Thicket-Fantail Rhipidura maculipectus". Ebird: photos, description, range map.
- Tvardikova K. (2022). "Rhipidura maculipectus Gray, GR, 1858". New Guinea Birds online.
