= Louis Rutten =

Dutch geologist (1884–1946)

Louis Martin Robert Rutten (4 June 1884 in Maastricht – 11 February 1946 in Utrecht) was a Dutch geologist. In the first part of the twentieth century he mapped large parts of the islands of the Dutch East Indies, Cuba, the Betic Cordilleras and the Dutch Antilles. He was the father of the biologist and geologist Martin Rutten.

Louis Rutten studied geology at Utrecht University. His supervisor was Arthur Wichmann. Rutten wrote his thesis in 1909 on a paleontological subject. Shortly after, he married Johanna Catharina Pekelharing, who accompanied and assisted him on his journeys overseas.

After finishing his studies, Rutten was employed by Bataafse Petroleum Maatschappij, a predecessor of Royal Dutch Shell, for which he was sent to Borneo to search for oil. During his time in Borneo he was able to lead a scientific expedition to Ceram from 1917-1919. His work for the BPM then brought him successively to Argentina, Cuba, Mexico and Peru.

In 1921, Rutten succeeded his old teacher Wichmann as professor in geology, paleontology and crystallography at Utrecht University. Because of his work in exploration he gave his Professorial Chair a practical dimension by taking students on excursions and expeditions overseas. In 1930, Rutten led an expedition to the Dutch Antilles, in 1933 and 1938 expeditions to Cuba. He was the author or co-author of many publications about the geology of the Dutch East Indies as well as of the West Indies.

In 1919 he became correspondent of the Royal Netherlands Academy of Arts and Sciences, and full member in 1923.

A species of South American gecko, Phyllodactylus rutteni, is named in his honor. His son Martin Gerard Rutten also became a geologist.

== Sources ==
- Wagenaar-Hummelinck, Pieter (1946). In Memoriam: Prof. L. Rutten en twee van zijner leerlingen.
- Marks, P. (1979). Honderd jaar geologisch onderwijs aan de Rijksuniversiteit Utrecht.
