= Martin Gerard Rutten =

Dutch geologist, paleontologist, and biologist

Martin Gerard Rutten (22 October 1910 – 13 October 1970) was a Dutch geologist, paleontologist, and biologist. He worked as a professor of geology at the universities of Amsterdam and Utrecht.

Rutten was born in Jombang, Indonesia to geologist Louis Martin Robert and biologist Johanna Catharina Pekelharing. He joined the Dutch Youth Association for Nature Study and took an early interest in birds and published briefly on birds observed during his later travels. Like his father, who was a geologist in the oil industry, he took an interest in geology and natural history travelling around the world. He studied at the University of Utrecht, receiving a bachelor's degree in 1929, a master's degree in 1933, and a doctorate in 1936 on the geology of the Santa Clara Province in Cuba supervised by his father. He examined foraminifera and Rudistidae. Like his father, he too joined the Bataafsche Petroleum Maatschappij in Indonesia during which time he continued to work on fossil foraminifera in the family Orbitoididae, publishing the work in 1941. During World War II he returned to work at Utrecht. At the end of the war he worked as a relief team director in the British controlled part of Germany which helped improve his command of English. He returned to teach geology at the University of Amsterdam. In 1951 he moved to the University of Utrecht. He served as a visiting professor at the University of Michigan, Ann Arbor.

Among Rutten's contributions was the use of paleomagnetism as an indicator of changes in the position of the land and as a means of examining age. He also hypothesized that the Icelandic table mountains of basalt were formed by lava flows under an ice sheet. He wrote on the uniformitarian view of geological processes (which he called actualism) and the evolution of life. He noted that the processes were the same over geological time but the environmental conditions may have varied to cause differences in the visible effects. Like A. I. Oparin, he supported the view that life forms came before the oxygenation of the atmosphere. His last book, The Origin of Life by Natural Causes was published posthumously in 1971.
