= C. E. A. Wichmann =

German-Dutch geologist and mineralogist (1851–1927)

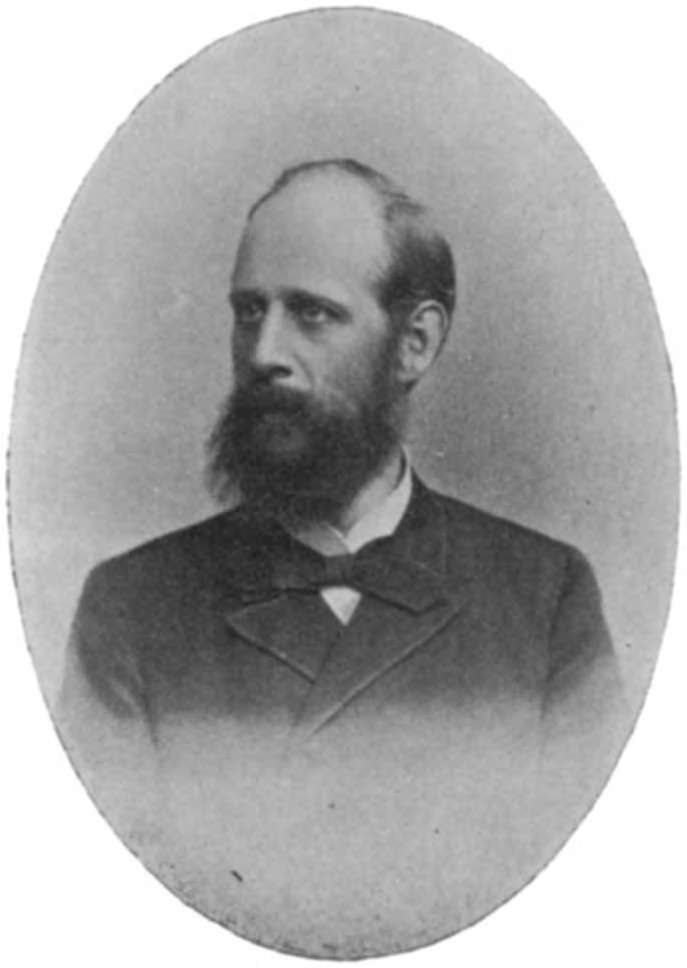
C. E. A. Wichmann

Carl Ernst Arthur Wichmann (9 April 1851 – 28 November 1927) was a German geologist and mineralogist. He was professor in geology at Utrecht University from 1879 to 1921, where he founded the geological institute. His daughter was the jurist and anarchist-socialist Clara Wichmann, his son the artist and fascist Erich Wichmann.

Arthur Wichmann spent his youth in Hamburg, where his father ran a boarding school. From 1871 to 1874 he studied at Leipzig University, where he was a pupil of Ferdinand Zirkel, from whom he got his interest in mineralogy. After he spent a few years as assistant to Zirkel he became professor at Utrecht University.

Geological research was never done at Utrecht before, and Wichmann committed himself to the task of starting a geological institute. Apart from setting up research and education Wichmann had to start a geological collection, for which reason he participated in expeditions to Dutch colonies, in 1888-1889 to the Dutch East Indies (Celebes, Flores, Timor and Rotti) and in 1902-1903 to New Guinea. As a scientist Wichmann was mainly interested in mineralogy and petrology. After his retirement in 1921 he returned to his city of birth Hamburg, where he died in 1927. His successor at Utrecht was L.M.R. Rutten.

== Sources ==
- P. Marks: Honderd jaar geologisch onderwijs aan de rijksuniversiteit Utrecht, 1979
- R.W.L. Vissers: Arthur Wichmann, grondlegger van de Aardwetenschappen in Utrecht, 2004
