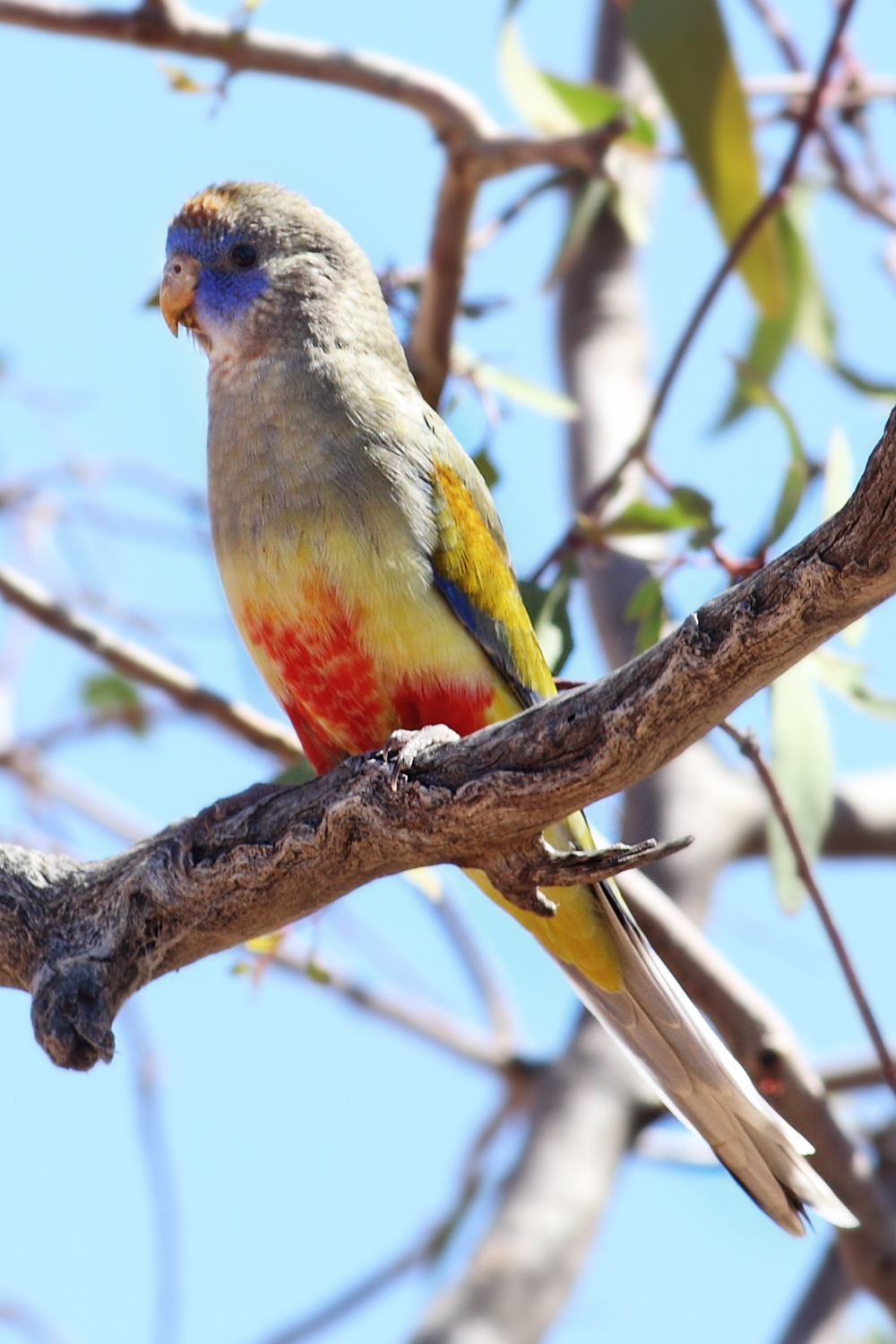
- Eastern bluebonnet (Northiella haematogaster)

Scientific classification
- Kingdom: Animalia
- Phylum: Chordata
- Class: Aves
- Order: Psittaciformes
- Family: Psittaculidae
- Subfamily: Platycercinae; Selby, 1836

Tribes
- Pezoporini; Platycercini

= Platycercinae =

Subfamily of birds

Platycercinae is a subfamily of birds belonging to the family Psittaculidae that inhabit Oceania. It consists of two tribes, the ground parrots and allies (Pezoporini) and the many species of broad-tailed parrot (Platycercini).

== Genera ==
Tribe Pezoporini:

- Genus Neophema
  - Blue-winged parrot, Neophema chrysostoma
  - Elegant parrot, Neophema elegans
  - Rock parrot, Neophema petrophila
  - Orange-bellied parrot, Neophema chrysogaster
  - Turquoise parrot, Neophema pulchella
  - Scarlet-chested parrot, Neophema splendida
- Genus Neopsephotus — sometimes included in Neophema
  - Bourke's parrot, Neopsephotus bourkii
- Genus Pezoporus
  - Ground parrot, Pezoporus wallicus
  - Night parrot, Pezoporus occidentalis

Tribe Platycercini:

- Genus Prosopeia
  - Crimson shining parrot, Prosopeia splendens
  - Masked shining parrot, Prosopeia personata
  - Maroon shining parrot, Prosopeia tabuensis
- Genus Eunymphicus
  - Horned parakeet, Eunymphicus cornutus
  - Ouvea parakeet, Eunymphicus uvaeensis
- Genus Cyanoramphus
  - Black-fronted parakeet, Cyanoramphus zealandicus†
  - Society parakeet, Cyanoramphus ulietanus†
  - Lord Howe parakeet, Cyanoramphus subflavescens†
  - Antipodes parakeet, Cyanoramphus unicolor
  - Red-crowned parakeet, Cyanoramphus novaezelandiae
  - Macquarie parakeet, Cyanoramphus erythrotis†
  - Reischek's parakeet, Cyanoramphus hochstetteri
  - Yellow-crowned parakeet, Cyanoramphus auriceps
  - Chatham parakeet, Cyanoramphus forbesi
  - Malherbe's parakeet, Cyanoramphus malherbi
  - New Caledonian parakeet Cyanoramphus saisseti
  - Norfolk parakeet Cyanoramphus cookii
- Genus Platycercus
  - Western rosella, Platycercus icterotis
  - Crimson rosella, Platycercus elegans
    - Adelaide rosella, Platycercus (elegans) adelaidae
    - Yellow rosella, Platycercus (elegans) flaveolus
  - Green rosella, Platycercus caledonicus
  - Pale-headed rosella, Platycercus adscitus
  - Eastern rosella, Platycercus eximius
  - Northern rosella, Platycercus venustus
- Genus Barnardius — sometimes included in Platycercus
  - Australian ringneck, Barnardius zonarius
- Genus Purpureicephalus
  - Red-capped parrot, Purpureicephalus spurius
- Genus Lathamus
  - Swift parrot, Lathamus discolor
- Genus Northiella — often included in Psephotus
  - Eastern bluebonnet, Northiella haematogaster
  - Naretha bluebonnet, Northiella narethae
- Genus Psephotus
  - Red-rumped parrot, Psephotus haematonotus
- Genus Psephotellus
  - Mulga parrot, Psephotellus varius
  - Golden-shouldered parrot, Psephotellus chrysopterygius
  - Hooded parrot, Psephotellus dissimilis
  - Paradise parrot, Psephotellus pulcherrimus†
