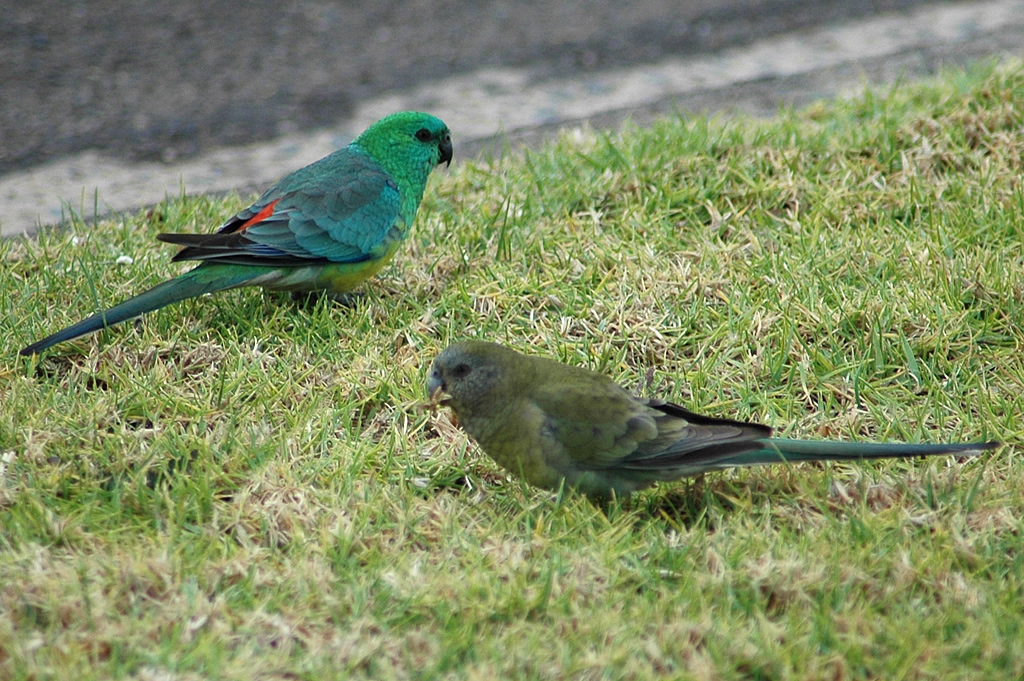
- A pair of red-rumped parrots

Scientific classification
- Kingdom: Animalia
- Phylum: Chordata
- Class: Aves
- Order: Psittaciformes
- Family: Psittaculidae
- Subfamily: Platycercinae
- Tribe: Platycercini; Selby, 1836

Genera
- Barnardius; Cyanoramphus; Eunymphicus; Lathamus; Northiella; Platycercus; Prosopeia; Psephotellus; Psephotus; Purpureicephalus

= Broad-tailed parrot =

Platycercini

Tribe of birds

A broad-tailed parrot is any of about 35–40 species belonging to the tribe Platycercini. The members of the tribe are small to medium in size, and all are native to Australasia, Australia in particular, but also New Zealand, New Caledonia, and nearby islands.

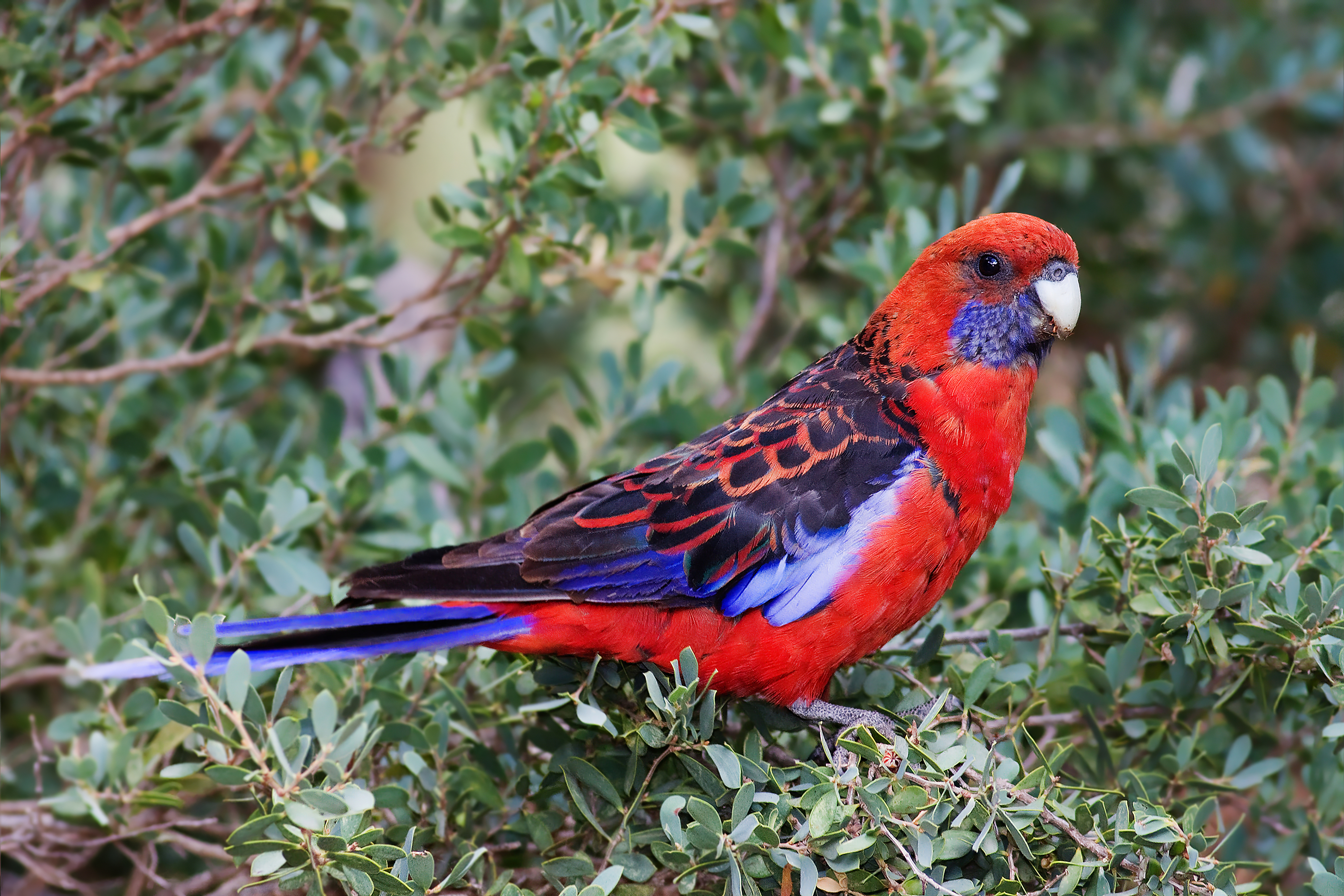
An adult crimson rosella

== Species ==
- Genus Prosopeia
  - Crimson shining parrot, Prosopeia splendens
  - Masked shining parrot, Prosopeia personata
  - Maroon shining parrot, Prosopeia tabuensis
- Genus Eunymphicus
  - Horned parakeet, Eunymphicus cornutus
  - Ouvea parakeet, Eunymphicus uvaeensis
- Genus Cyanoramphus
  - Black-fronted kakariki, Cyanoramphus zealandicus†
  - Raiatea kakariki, Cyanoramphus ulietanus†
  - Lord Howe parakeet, Cyanoramphus subflavescens†
  - Antipodes kakariki, Cyanoramphus unicolor
  - Red-crowned kakariki, Cyanoramphus novaezelandiae
  - Macquarie parakeet, Cyanoramphus erythrotis†
  - Reischek's kakariki, Cyanoramphus hochstetteri
  - Yellow-crowned kakariki, Cyanoramphus auriceps
  - Chatham Islands kakariki, Cyanoramphus forbesi
  - Malherbe's parakeet, Cyanoramphus malherbi
  - New Caledonian kakariki Cyanoramphus saisseti
  - Norfolk parakeet Cyanoramphus cooki
- Genus Platycercus
  - Western rosella, Platycercus icterotis
  - Crimson rosella, Platycercus elegans
    - Adelaide rosella, Platycercus (elegans) adelaidae
    - Yellow rosella, Platycercus (elegans) flaveolus
  - Green rosella, Platycercus caledonicus
  - Pale-headed rosella, Platycercus adscitus
  - Eastern rosella, Platycercus eximius
  - Northern rosella, Platycercus venustus
- Genus Barnardius - sometimes included in Platycercus
  - Australian ringneck, Barnardius zonarius
- Genus Purpureicephalus
  - Red-capped parrot, Purpureicephalus spurius
- Genus Lathamus
  - Swift parrot, Lathamus discolor
- Genus Northiella - often included in Psephotus
  - Eastern bluebonnet, Northiella haematogaster
  - Naretha bluebonnet, Northiella narethae
- Genus Psephotus
  - Red-rumped parrot, Psephotus haematonotus
- Genus Psephotellus
  - Mulga parrot, Psephotellus varius
  - Golden-shouldered parrot, Psephotellus chrysoptergius
  - Hooded parrot, Psephotellus dissimilis
  - Paradise parrot, Psephotellus pulcherrimus† (extinct, late 1920s)

The budgerigar was traditionally placed in this tribe, but this inclusion is incorrect. The closest relatives of the budgerigar are the lories and lorikeets. The genera Neopsephotus, Neophema, and Pezoporus are placed in a separate, but closely related tribe, the Pezoporini based on the paper by Joseph et al. (2011)
