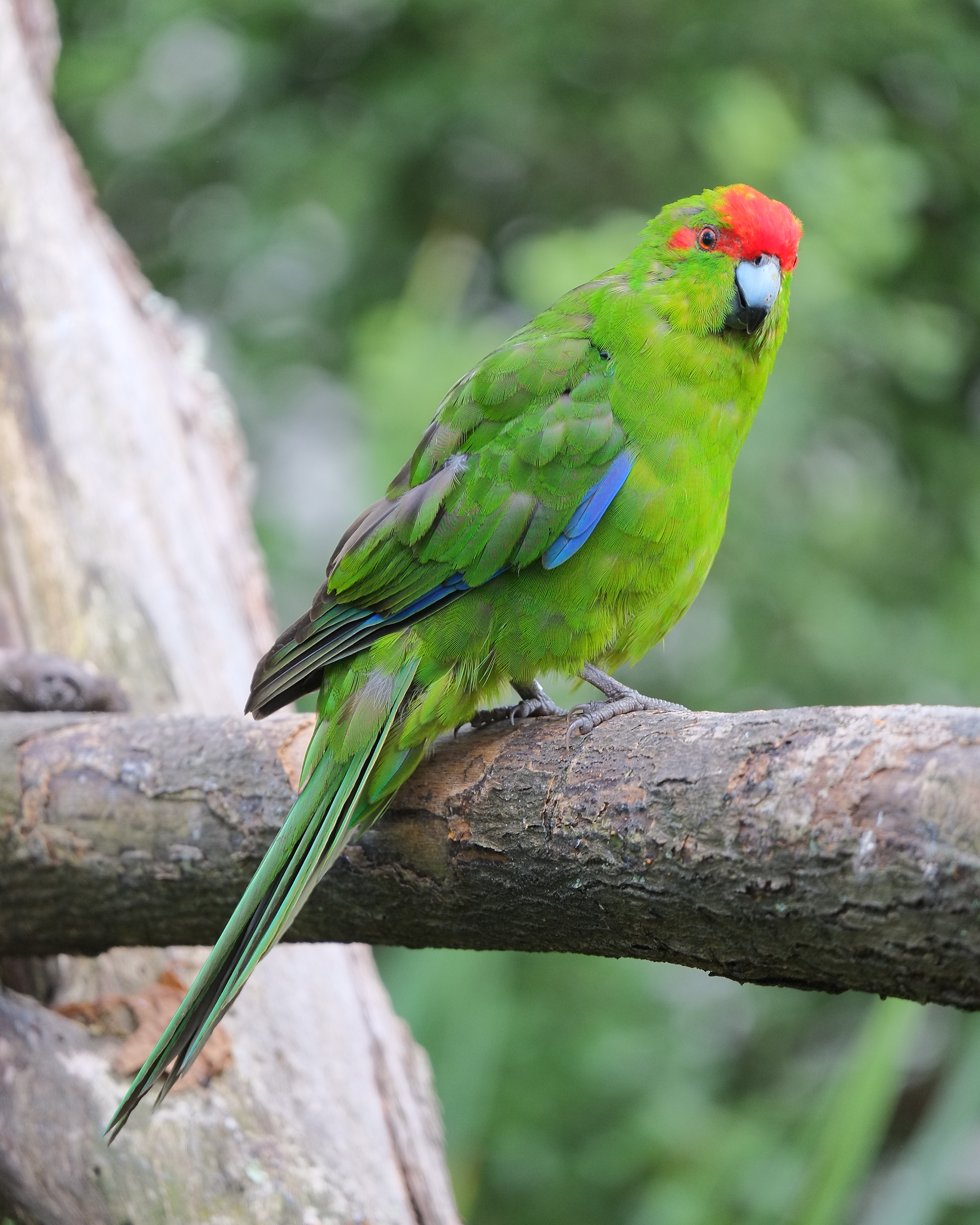
- Red-crowned parakeet (Cyanoramphus novaezelandiae)

Scientific classification
- Kingdom: Animalia
- Phylum: Chordata
- Class: Aves
- Order: Psittaciformes
- Family: Psittaculidae
- Tribe: Platycercini
- Genus: Cyanoramphus

Species
- Cyanoramphus auriceps (Kuhl, 1820); Cyanoramphus malherbi (Souancé, 1857); Cyanoramphus novaezelandiae (Sparrman, 1787)

= Kākāriki =

Common name for three species of parakeets

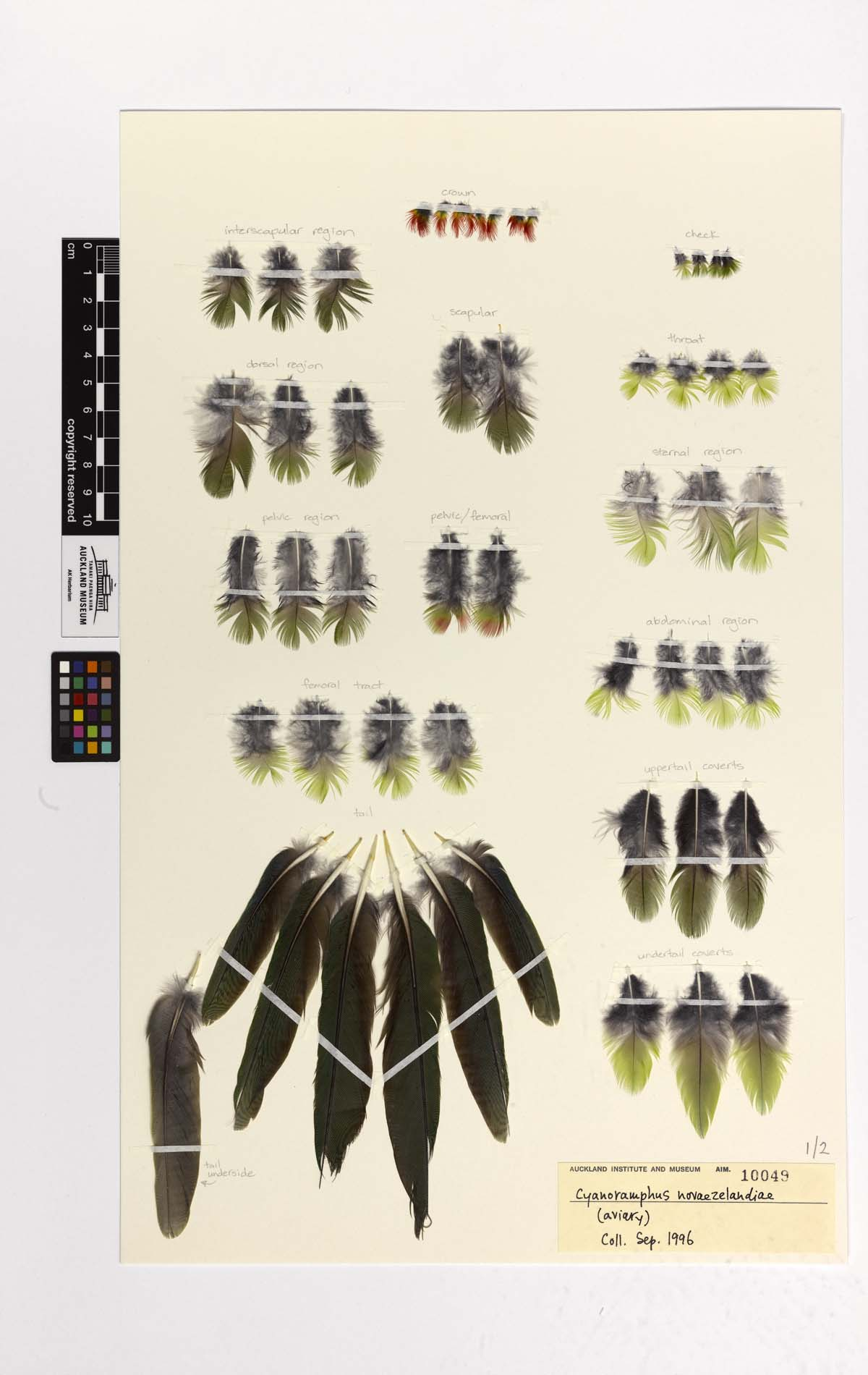
Museum specimen of kākāriki feathers

The three species of kākāriki (also spelled kaakaariki, without macrons), or New Zealand parakeets, are the most common species of parakeets in the genus Cyanoramphus, family Psittaculidae. The most commonly used name kākāriki is Māori in origin meaning "small parrot" (from kākā ‘parrot’ and riki ‘small’); it has also been used to refer to the colour green because of the birds' predominantly green plumage. The patches of red on the birds' rumps are, according to legend, the blood of the demigod Tāwhaki.

The three species on mainland New Zealand are the yellow-crowned parakeet (Cyanoramphus auriceps), the red-crowned parakeet, or red-fronted parakeet (C. novaezelandiae), and the critically endangered Malherbe's parakeet or orange-fronted parakeet (C. malherbi – not to be confused with Eupsittula canicularis, a popular aviary bird known as the orange-fronted conure, orange-fronted parakeet, or half-moon conure).

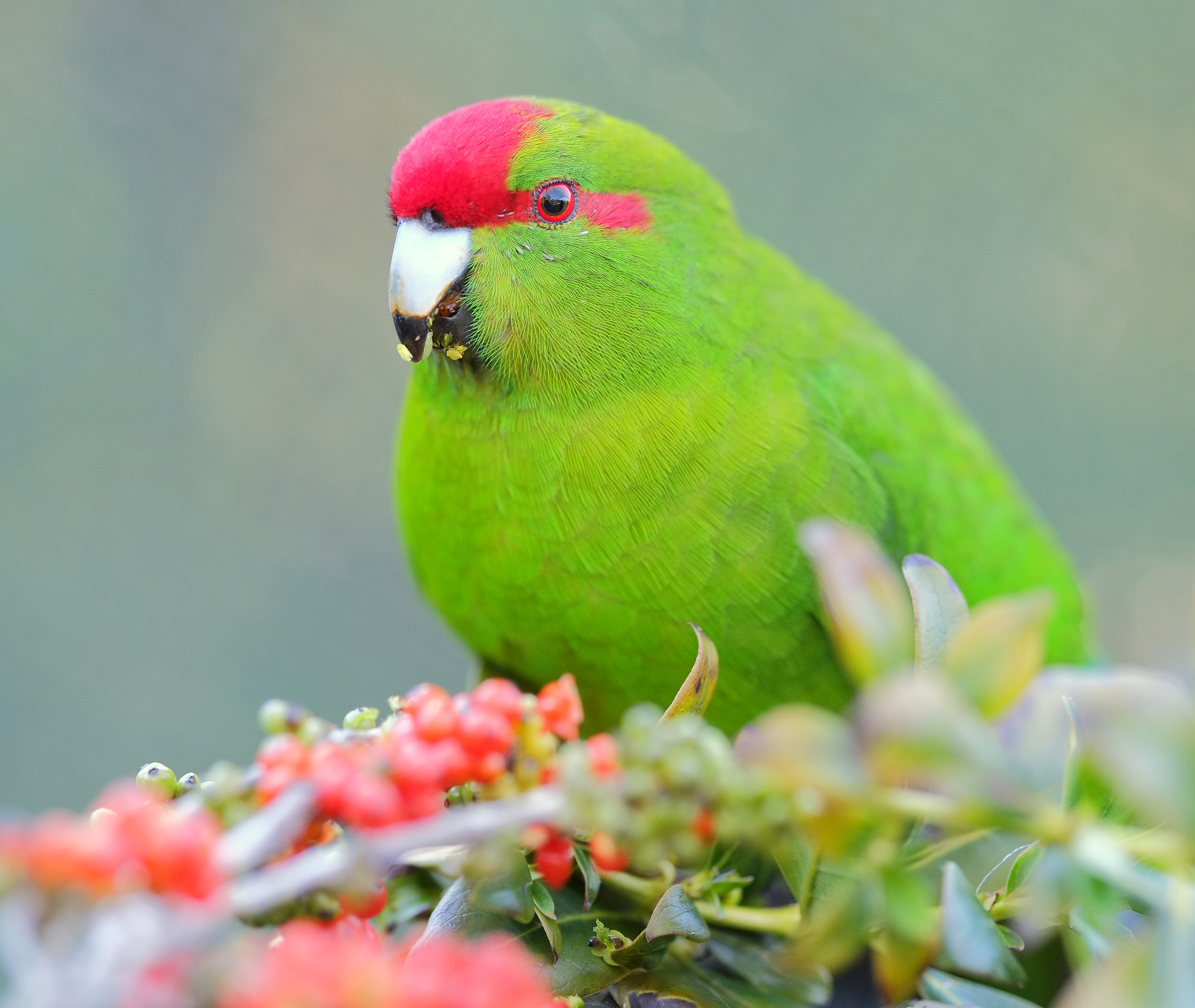
Kākāriki eating berries

== Habitat ==
All above species are endemic to New Zealand, and have become endangered as a result of habitat destruction following human settlement and nest predation by introduced mammals. Scarce on the mainland, kākāriki have survived well on outlying islands. They are easy to breed, but as with all protected native species in New Zealand, a license from the Department of Conservation is required to keep them in captivity—though they, along with lizards, are the only protected native species for which a license allows them to be kept privately (neither for public display and advocacy nor for breed and release for conservation purposes).

Mitochondrial DNA analysis has indicated that the orange-fronted parakeet is a separate species and not just a colour variation of the yellow-crowned parakeet. The orange-fronted parakeet is highly endangered, with less than 200 individuals remaining in the North Canterbury region of the South Island. Furthermore, Chatham Island's yellow-crowned parakeet and the red-crowned populations of New Caledonia, Norfolk Island, and the subantarctic islands have been determined to be distinct species.

The identification and detection of sex are very important for the protection of kākāriki. Understanding the sex ratios within populations helps in managing breeding programs and maintaining balanced demographics in captivity, contributing to the preservation of this species. Accurate sex testing plays a pivotal role in effective population management and conservation strategies for kākāriki.
