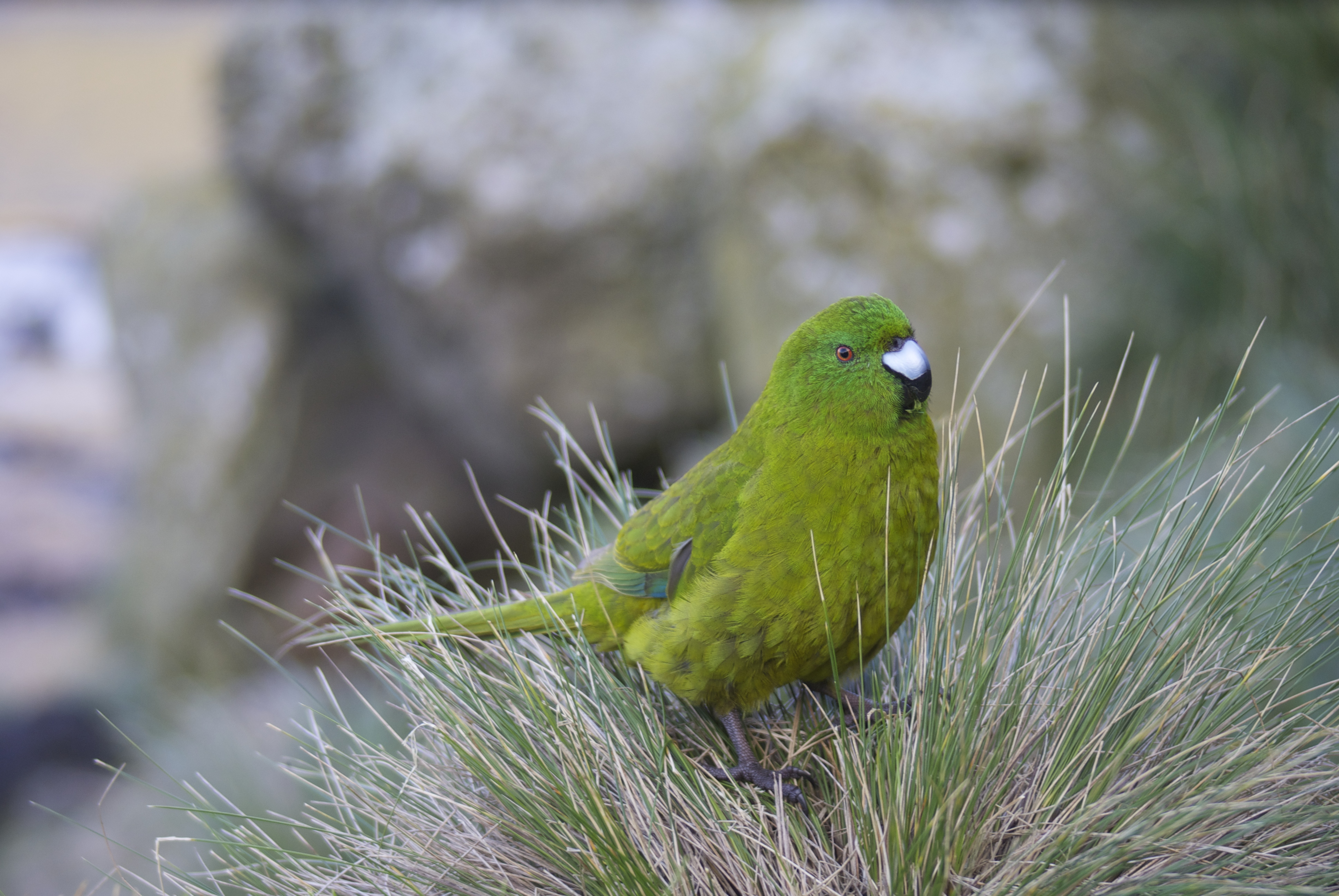
- At Ringdove Bay on Antipodes Island.

Conservation status
- Vulnerable (IUCN 3.1)
- CITES Appendix II

Scientific classification
- Kingdom: Animalia
- Phylum: Chordata
- Class: Aves
- Order: Psittaciformes
- Family: Psittaculidae
- Genus: Cyanoramphus
- Species: C. unicolor

Binomial name
- Cyanoramphus unicolor (Lear, 1831)
- Native range

= Antipodes kakariki =

Species of bird

The Antipodes kakariki (Cyanoramphus unicolor), also known as the Antipodes parakeet or Antipodes Island parakeet, is a parrot in the family Psittaculidae that is endemic to the Antipodes Islands of New Zealand. It is one of two parrot species found on the islands, and one of only five ground-dwelling parrots in the world. They are long-living birds that may live up to 10 years of age, but the introduction of mice that compete with them for food was a threat to their survival on the Antipodes Islands until the mice were successfully eradicated from the Islands in 2016 (confirmed 2018). Unusually for parrots, they sometimes prey upon other birds, a trait shared by another New Zealand parrot, the kea.

== Taxonomy ==
The Antipodes kakariki was depicted in 1831 by English artist Edward Lear in his Illustrations of the Family of Psittacidae, or Parrots. Lear used the common name "uniform parakeet" and coined the binomial name Platycercus unicolor. The species is now placed in the genus Cyanoramphus that was introduced in 1854 by French ornithologist Charles Lucien Bonaparte.

Its closest relative is Reischek's kakariki, which also lives on the Antipodes Islands. Other relatives include the Norfolk parakeet, Raiatea kakariki, and Chatham Islands kakariki.

== Distribution and habitat ==
The Antipodes kakariki is endemic to the Antipodes Islands of New Zealand. They are common on the main Antipodes Island, but are less common on smaller islands in the group such as Bollons Island. They live in very small numbers on Leeward Island, where they only live in a 0.1 km^{2} (0.039 sq mi) region of the island. The Antipodes kakariki lives on the 0.1 km^{2} (0.039 sq mi) Archway Island, as well.

== Description ==
It is the largest species in the genus Cyanoramphus at 30 cm (12 in) long. and makes a penetrating kok-kok-kok-kok noise.

== Behaviour and ecology ==
These kakarikis eat leaves, buds, grass, and tussock stalks, as well as sometimes feeding on seeds and flowers, and sometimes scavenge dead seabirds. The Antipodes kakariki also preys on grey-backed storm petrels, entering burrows to kill incubating adults, even digging at the entrance if it is too small.

Antipodes kakarikis spend much of their time on the ground and in very small groups, in pairs, or alone.

They are inquisitive, territorial, and mischievous.

Their nest is in a tunnel 2 m beneath fibrous peat away from the wind.

== Status ==
Their population is stable, but their conservation status is vulnerable. The population is 2,000-3,000.

Originally entirely restricted to the islands that bear their name, a small captive population, founded with less than 20 individuals, now inhabits the mainland.

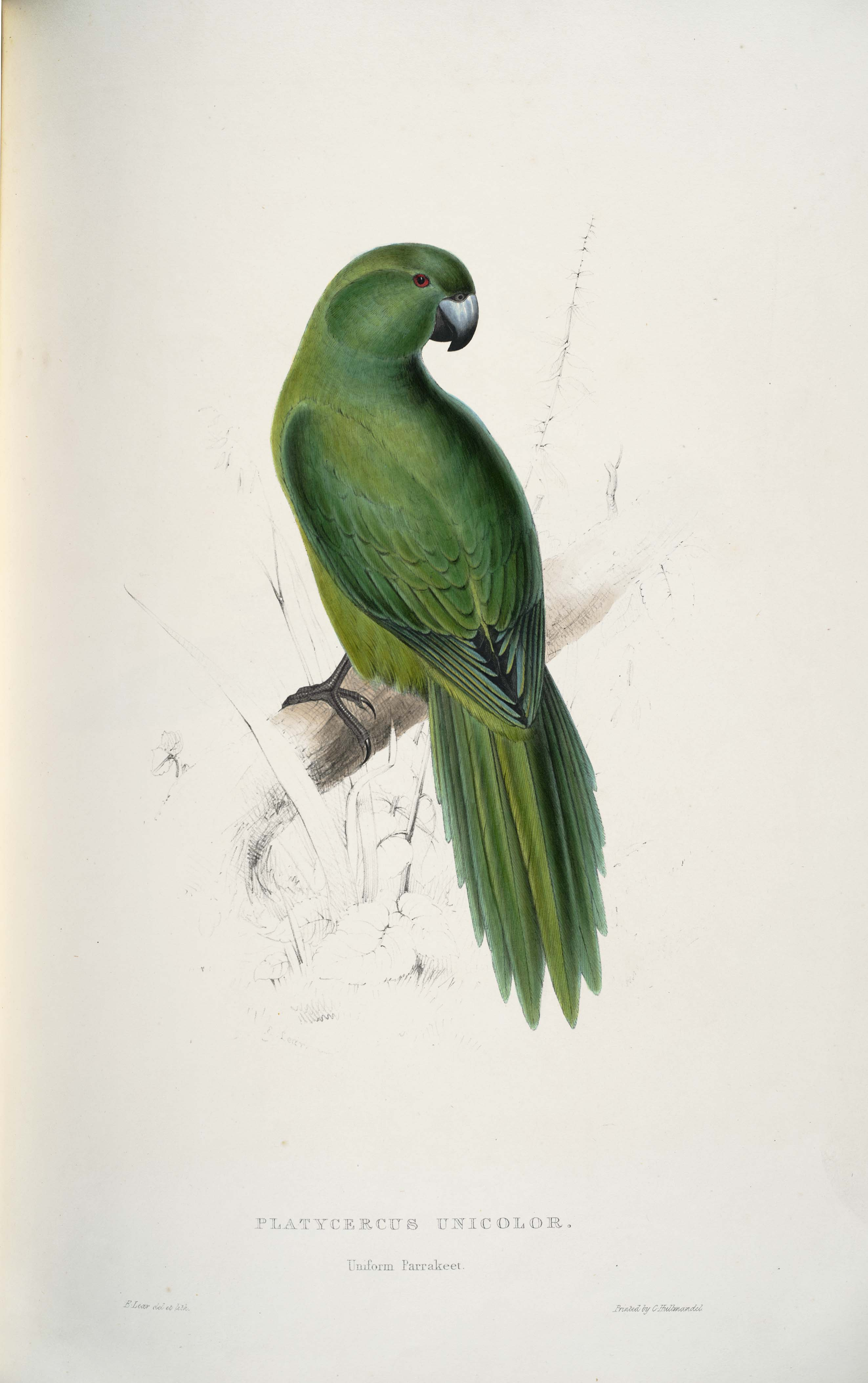
Antipodes Parakeet by Edward Lear (1812–1888).

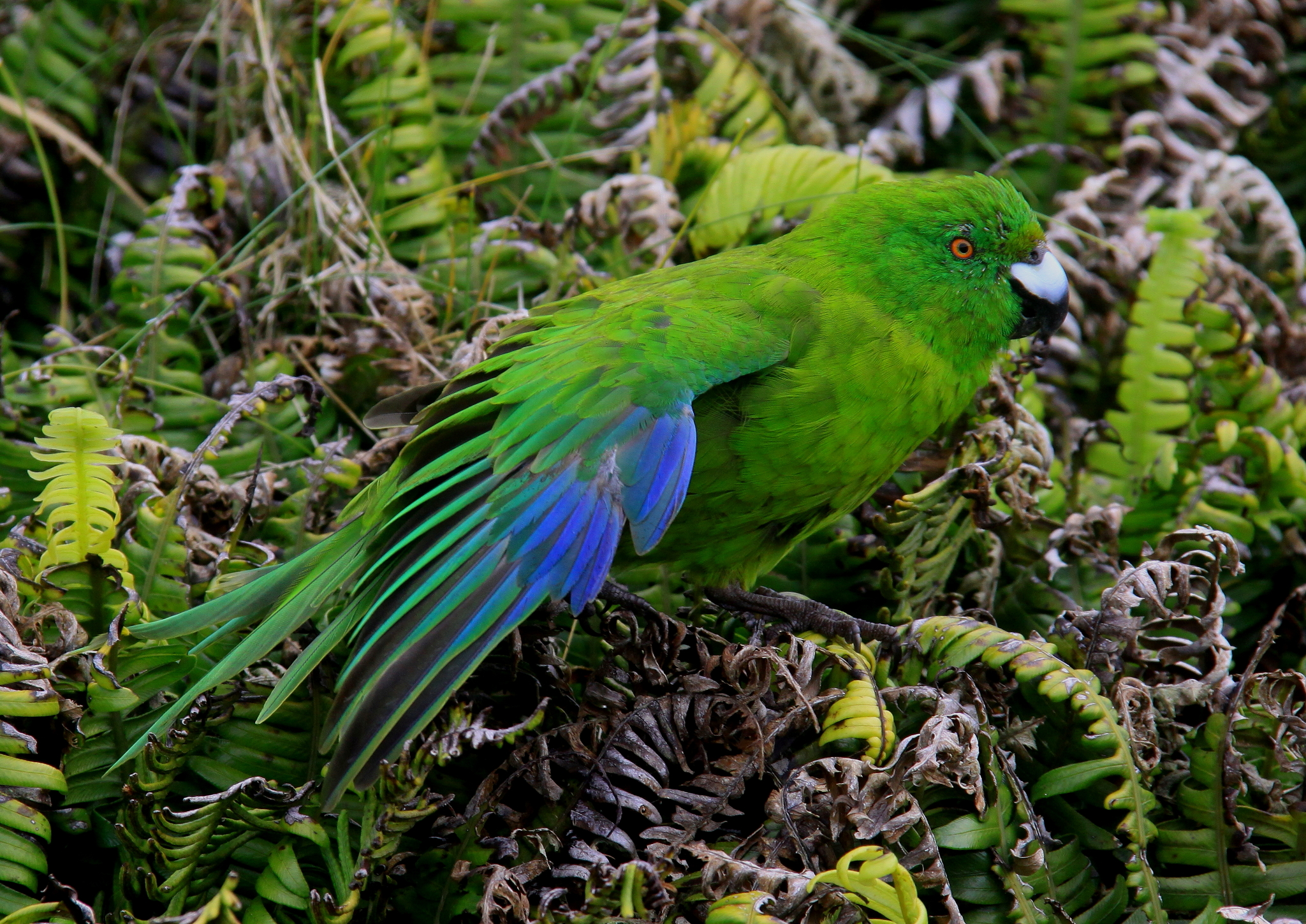

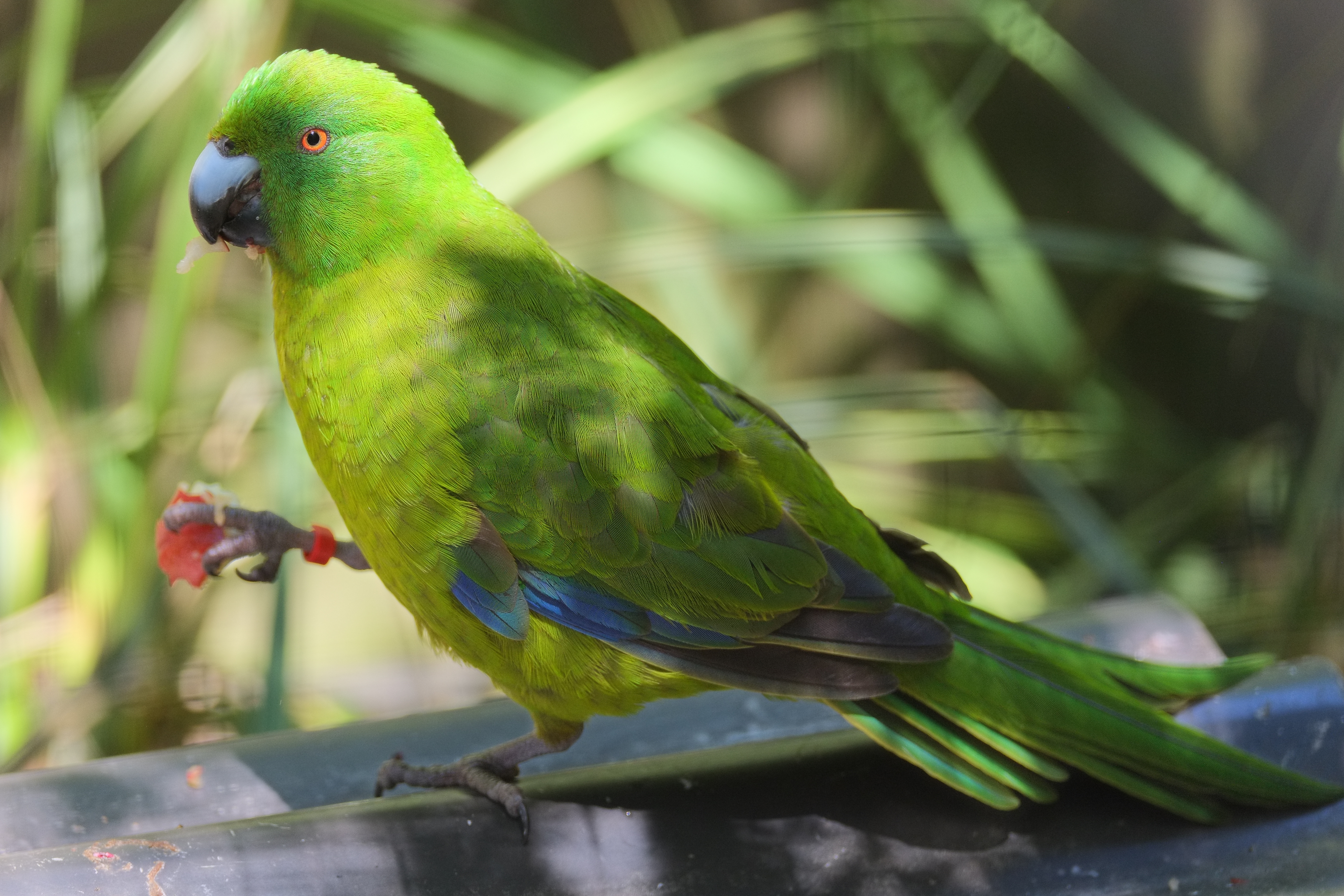
Eating a piece of apple

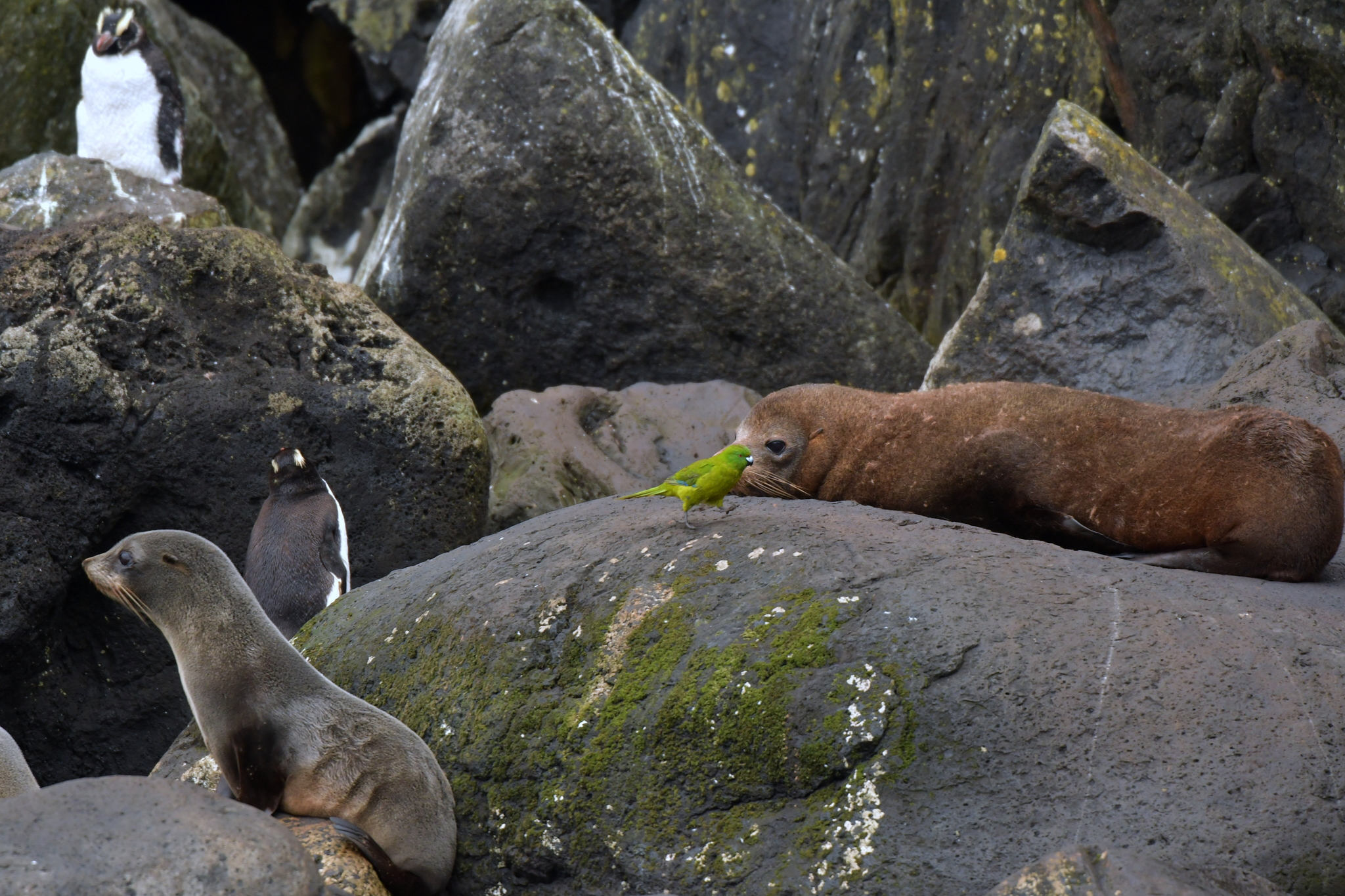
With penguins and fur seals

== See also ==
- Kākāriki
