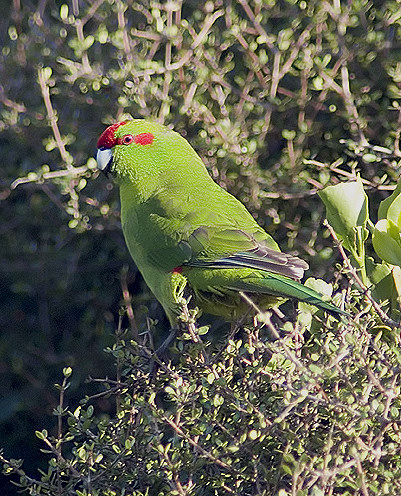
- Red-crowned parakeet (Cyanoramphus novaezelandiae)

Scientific classification
- Kingdom: Animalia
- Phylum: Chordata
- Class: Aves
- Order: Psittaciformes
- Family: Psittaculidae
- Subfamily: Platycercinae
- Tribe: Platycercini
- Genus: Cyanoramphus; Bonaparte, 1854

Species
- see text

= Cyanoramphus =

Genus of birds

Cyanoramphus is a genus of parakeets native to New Zealand and islands of the southern Pacific Ocean. The New Zealand species are locally called kākāriki. They are small to medium-sized parakeets with long tails and predominantly green plumage. Most species are forest dwellers, although several of the subantarctic species live in open grassland. The genus formerly had a widely disjunct distribution; while most of the genus ranged from New Caledonia to Macquarie Island, two species were found in the Society Islands, 4,100 km (2,500 mi) away from the rest.

Like many other species of birds, the Cyanoramphus kakariki have suffered from changes brought about by humans. The two species from the Society Islands, the black-fronted kakariki and the Raiatea kakariki, are now extinct, as are the taxa from Lord Howe Island and Macquarie Island, and an undescribed Campbell Island form. One species, the orange-fronted kakariki (C. malherbi), is critically endangered, while most other species are endangered or vulnerable. Habitat loss and introduced species are considered responsible for the declines and extinctions.

The genus Cyanoramphus was introduced in 1854 by French ornithologist Charles Lucien Bonaparte. The genus name combines the Ancient Greek kuanos meaning "dark-blue" and rhamphos meaning "bill". The type species was designated by English zoologist George Robert Gray in 1855 as what is now the extinct black-fronted parakeet (Cyanoramphus zealandicus).

== Species ==
Of the 10 recognised species, two are extinct:

Genus Cyanoramphus – Bonaparte, 1854 – eleven species
Common name	Scientific name and subspecies	Range	Size and ecology	IUCN status and estimated population
New Caledonian kakariki	Cyanoramphus saisseti Verreaux & Des Murs, 1860	New Caledonia	Size: 26 cm (10.2 in) Habitat: Montane forests Diet: Casuarina and Carica papaya fruits and seeds, and other plants	NE Unknown
Chatham Islands kakariki	Cyanoramphus forbesi Rothschild, 1893	Restricted to Mangere Island and Little Mangere Island in the Chatham Islands group, New Zealand	Size: 23–26 cm (9.1–10.2 in) Habitat: Forest and shrubland, especially dense and unbroken. Prefers Nothofagus-Podocarpus forest Diet: Varies seasonally: in spring (Oct–Nov), predominantly invertebrates, flowers, and seeds; in autumn (Mar–May), includes more leaves and seeds	VU 250–999
Norfolk parakeet	Cyanoramphus cookii Gray, 1859	Norfolk Island, Australia	Size: 30 cm (12 in) Habitat: Forest Diet: Mostly seeds and blossoms, with fruits and leaf shoots	EN <100
Antipodes kakariki	Cyanoramphus unicolor (Lear, 1831)	Antipodes Islands, New Zealand	Size: 30 cm (11.8 in) Habitat: Tall and dense Poa litorosa grasslands, especially on slopes and near water. Also around Carex sedge, prickly fern, and Coprosma antipoda scrub Diet: Leaves of Poa and Carex, seeds, berries, flowers, carrion of penguins and small petrels, seabird eggs	VU 2,000–3,000
Yellow-crowned kakariki	Cyanoramphus auriceps (Kuhl, 1820)	New Zealand and its offshore islands, and Auckland Island	Size: 23 cm (9.1 in) Habitat: Lush Nothofagus-Podocarpus mountain forest at up to 1250 m (4100 ft) Diet: Seeds, berries, buds, shoots, roots, and invertebrates including Ultracoelostoma assimile scale insects and Heliostibes vibratrix caterpillars	NT 10,000–30,000
Orange-fronted kakariki or Malherbe's parakeet	Cyanoramphus malherbi Souancé, 1857	Restricted to three valleys on New Zealand's South Island and offshore island sanctuaries	Size: 20 cm (7.9 in) Habitat: Beech forest necessarily providing mature trees with natural cavities Diet: Seeds, berries, flowers, buds, leaves, and invertebrates, including scale insects, caterpillars, and aphids	CR 50–249
Red-crowned kakariki	Cyanoramphus novaezelandiae (Sparrman, 1787) Four subspecies: C. n. cyanurus Salvadori, 1891; C. n. novaezelandiae (Sparrman, 1787); C. n. chathamensis Oliver, 1930; † C. n. erythrotis (Wagler, 1832)	New Zealand (Note: Nominate subspecies (C. n. novaezelandiae) is thought to be extinct on mainland New Zealand.)	Size: 25–27 cm (9.8–10.6 in) Habitat: Forest, shrubland, grassland, varying across range and between subspecies Diet: Greatly varies seasonally: buds and blossoms in spring, fruit in summer, seeds in autumn, seeds and fruit in winter. Also nectar, invertebrates, honeydew, seaweed, and small limpets.	LC 16,500–35,300
Reischek's kakariki	Cyanoramphus hochstetteri (Reischek, 1889)	Antipodes Islands, New Zealand	Size: 28 cm (11 in) Habitat: Low vegetation in more open areas around range Diet: Leaves, flowers, berries, seeds, and invertebrates. Occasionally scavenges from dead seabirds	NE 4,000–6,000
† Black-fronted kakariki	Cyanoramphus zealandicus (Latham, 1790)	Tahiti, French Polynesia	Size: 25 cm (9.8 in) Habitat: Presumed forest, specifically subtropical/tropical moist lowland forest Diet: Unknown	EX
† Raiatea kakariki	Cyanoramphus ulietanus (J. F. Gmelin, 1788)	Raiatea, French Polynesia (Note: Known only from two specimens.)	Size: 25 cm (9.8 in) Habitat: Presumed forest, specifically subtropical/tropical moist lowland forest Diet: Unknown	EX

Also, subfossil remains have been found from a yet undescribed extinct species from Campbell Island, New Zealand.

- Eunymphicus
- Cyanoramphus
  - New Caledonian parakeet (C. saisseti)
  - - Chatham Islands parakeet (C. forbesi)
    - - Norfolk parakeet (C. cookii)
      - Antipodes parakeet (C. unicolor)
      - - Yellow-crowned parakeet (C. auriceps)
        - - - Malherbe's parakeet (C. malherbi)
            - Reischek's parakeet (C. hochstetteri)
          - - Red-crowned parakeet (C. n. chathamensis)
            - Red-crowned parakeet (C. n. novaezelandiae)

Phylogeny of Cyanoramphus
