= Orange-fronted parakeet =

Orange-fronted parakeet may refer to:

- Eupsittula canicularis, also known as the orange-fronted conure, or half-moon conure, a species of bird from Central America
- Cyanoramphus malherbi, also known as Malherbe's parakeet, or kākāriki karaka, a species of bird from New Zealand
