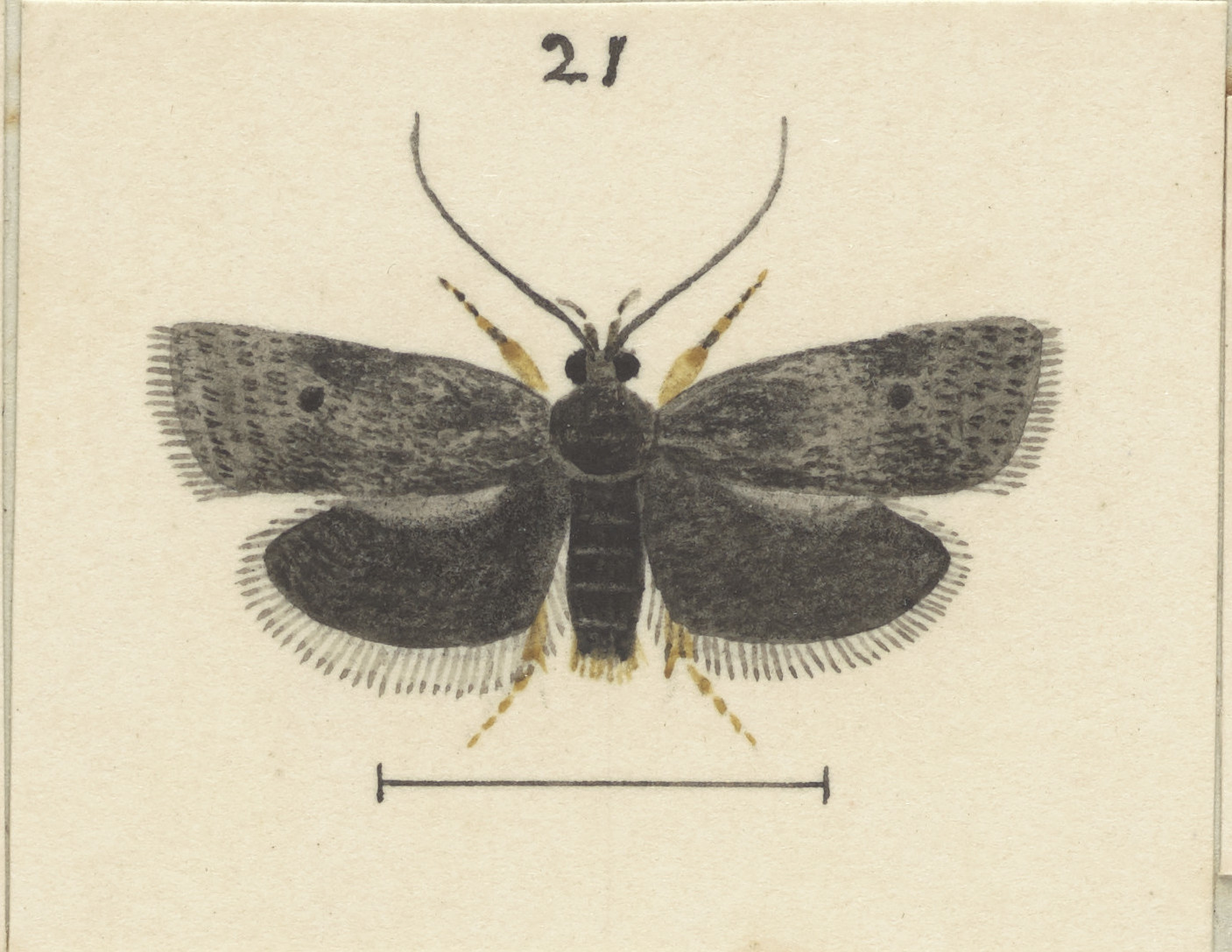
- Illustration by George Hudson

Scientific classification
- Kingdom: Animalia
- Phylum: Arthropoda
- Class: Insecta
- Order: Lepidoptera
- Family: Oecophoridae
- Genus: Heliostibes
- Species: H. vibratrix

Binomial name
- Heliostibes vibratrix Meyrick, 1927

= Heliostibes vibratrix =

Species of moth endemic to New Zealand

Heliostibes vibratrix is a species of moth in the family Oecophoridae. It is endemic to New Zealand. This species inhabits open mountainside habitat and is known to feed on Nothofagus truncata. Yellow-crowned parakeets predate the larvae of H. vibratrix.

== Taxonomy ==
This species was described by Edward Meyrick in 1927 using a specimen collected by George Hudson in January at Mount Arthur at 4000 ft. The female holotype specimen is held at the Natural History Museum, London.

== Description ==
Meyrick described the species as follows:

♀ 16 mm. Head and palpi fuscous. Thorax rather darker bronzy-fuscous. Abdomen dark fuscous, ventral surface pale yellow. Forewings suboblong, termen hardly oblique; fuscous, with numerous irregular transverse cloudy dark purplish-fuscous striae; second discal stigma forming a small transverse dark fuscous spot; two slight whitish marks on dorsum about middle: cilia fuscous. Hindwings blackish-grey; cilia grey, basal third dark fuscous.

== Distribution ==
This species is endemic to New Zealand.

== Habitat and host species ==
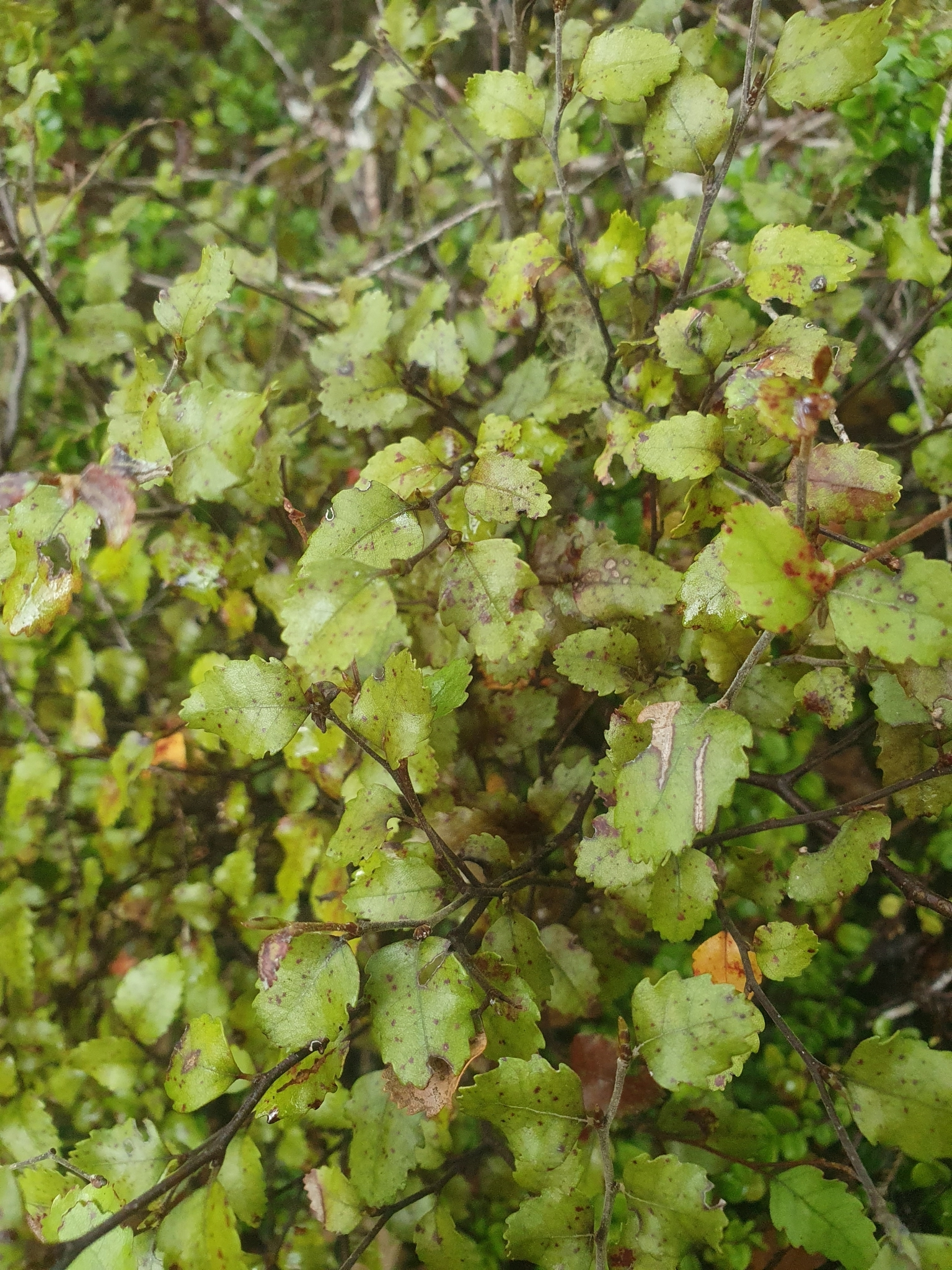
Nothofagus truncata, a host species of H. vibratrix.

This species prefers open mountainside habitat. The larvae of this species are known to feed on Nothofagus truncata. Larvae are a predated by the Yellow-crowned parakeet.
