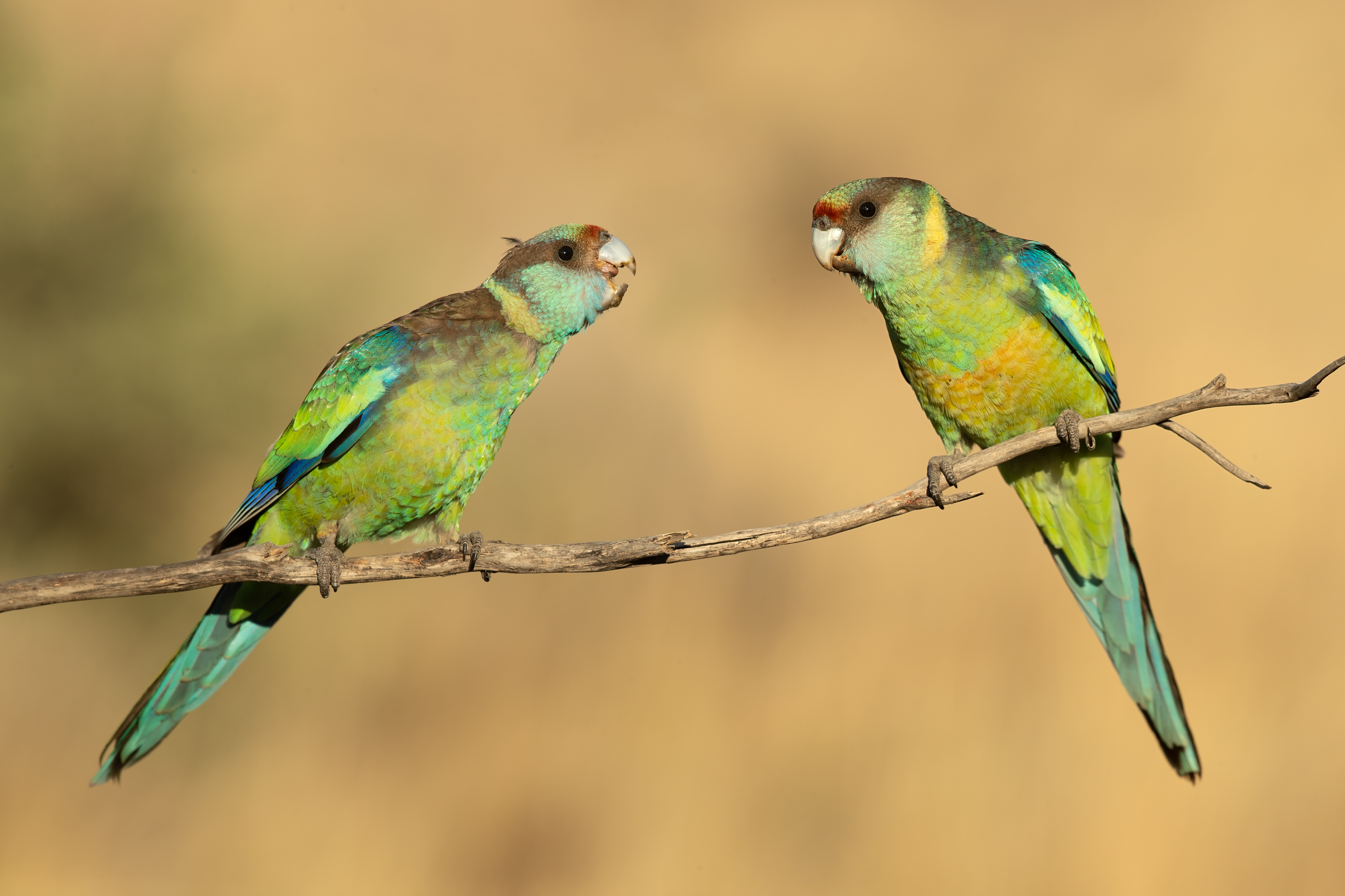
- B. z. barnardi near Patchewollock, Victoria

Conservation status
- Least Concern (IUCN 3.1)

Scientific classification
- Kingdom: Animalia
- Phylum: Chordata
- Class: Aves
- Order: Psittaciformes
- Family: Psittaculidae
- Tribe: Platycercini
- Genus: Barnardius; Bonaparte, 1854
- Species: B. zonarius

Binomial name
- Barnardius zonarius (Shaw, 1805)

Subspecies
- B. z. zonarius B. z. semitorquatus B. z. barnardi B. z. macgillivrayi

Synonyms
- Barnardius barnardi (Vigors & Horsfield, 1827)

= Australian ringneck =

Species of bird

The Australian ringneck (Barnardius zonarius) is a parrot native to Australia. Except for extreme tropical and highland areas, the species has adapted to all conditions. Treatments of genus Barnardius have previously recognised two species, the Port Lincoln parrot (Barnardius zonarius) and the mallee ringneck (Barnardius barnardi), but due to these readily interbreeding at the contact zone they are usually regarded as a single species B. zonarius with subspecific descriptions. Currently, four subspecies are recognised, each with a distinct range.

In Western Australia, the ringneck competes for nesting space with the rainbow lorikeet, an introduced species. To protect the ringneck, culls of the lorikeet are sanctioned by authorities in this region. Overall, though, the ringneck is not a threatened species.

== Description ==
The subspecies of the Australian ringneck differ considerably in colouration. It is a medium size species around 33 cm (13 in) long. The basic colour is green, and all four subspecies have the characteristic yellow ring around the hindneck; wings and tail are a mixture of green and blue.

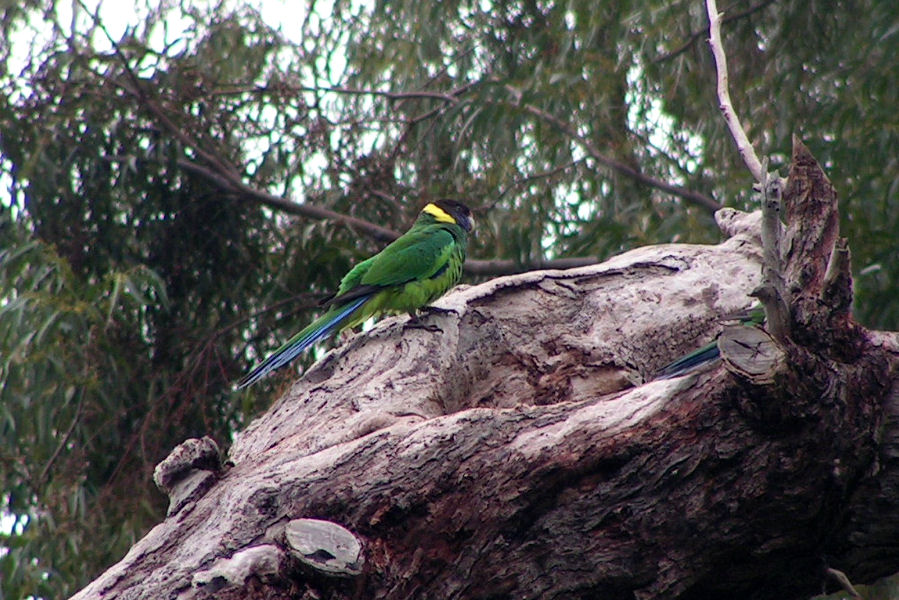
B. z. semitorquatus, Perth, Western Australia

The B. z. zonarius and B. z. semitorquatus subspecies have a dull black head; back, rump and wings are brilliant green; throat and breast bluish-green. The difference between these two subspecies is that B. z. zonarius has a yellow abdomen while B. z. semitorquatus has a green abdomen; the latter has also a prominent crimson frontal band that the former lacks (the intermediate shown in the box has characteristics of both subspecies). The two other subspecies differ from these subspecies by the bright green crown and nape and blush cheek-patches. The underparts of B. z. barnardi are turquoise-green with an irregular orange-yellow band across the abdomen; the back and mantle are deep blackish-blue and this subspecies has a prominent red frontal band. The B. z. macgillivrayi is generally pale green, with no red frontal band, and a wide uniform pale yellow band across the abdomen.

The calls of the Mallee ringneck and Cloncurry parrot have been described as "ringing", and the calls of the Port Lincoln ringneck and Twenty-eight parrot have been described as "strident". The name of the Twenty-eight is an onomatopoeic derived from its distinctive call, which sounds like "twenty-eight" (or the French equivalent, vingt-huit, according to one early description).

== Taxonomy and naming ==
The Australian ringneck was first described by English naturalist George Shaw and drawn by Frederick Polydore Nodder in 1805 in their work The Naturalist's Miscellany: Or, Coloured Figures of Natural Objects; Drawn and Described Immediately From Nature. He called it Psittacus zonarius "zoned parrot". A broad-tailed parrot, it is most closely related to the rosellas of the genus Platycercus, and has been placed in that genus by some authorities, including Ferdinand Bauer.

Pre-existing names for the species, derived from the Nyungar language of Southwest Australia, are dowarn [pronounced dow'awn] and doomolok [dorm'awe'lawk]; these were identified from over one hundred records of regional and orthographic variants to supplement the names already suggested by John Gilbert, Dominic Serventy and others.

Currently, four subspecies of ringneck are recognised, all of which have been described as distinct species in the past: (As of 1993, the Twenty-eight and Cloncurry parrot were treated as subspecies of the Port Lincoln parrot and the mallee ringneck, respectively.)

Several other subspecies have been described, but are considered synonyms with one of the above subspecies. B. z. occidentalis has been synonymised with B. z. zonarius. Intermediates exist between all subspecies except for between B. z. zonarius and B. z. macgillivrayi. Intermediates have been associated with land clearing for agriculture in southern Western Australia.

The classification of this species is still debated, and molecular research by Joseph and Wilke in 2006 found that the complex split genetically into two clades—one roughly correlating with B. z. barnardi and the other with the other three forms; B. z. macgillivrayi was more closely related to B. z. zonarius than to the neighbouring B. z. barnardi. The researchers felt it was premature to reorganise the classification of the complex until more study was undertaken.

=== Subspecies ===
Subspecies
Common and binomial names	Image	Description	Range
Twenty-eight parrot		Identification: The red band and green belly distinguishes it from the Port Lincoln parrot.	Found in the south western forests of coastal and subcoastal Western Australia.
B. z. semitorquatus (Quoy & Gaimard, 1830)		Identification: The red band and green belly distinguishes it from the Port Lincoln parrot.	Found in the south western forests of coastal and subcoastal Western Australia.
Port Lincoln parrot or Port Lincoln ringneck			Common from Port Lincoln in the south east to Alice Springs in the north east, and from the Karri and Tingle forests of South Western Australia up to the Pilbara district.
B. z. zonarius (Shaw, 1805)			Common from Port Lincoln in the south east to Alice Springs in the north east, and from the Karri and Tingle forests of South Western Australia up to the Pilbara district.
Cloncurry parrot		Identification: The yellow belly, lighter green colour and lack of red band distinguishes it from the mallee ringneck.	Found from the Lake Eyre basin in the Northern Territory to the Gulf Country of northwestern Queensland, from Burketown south to Boulia, with Kynuna and Camooweel as eastern and western limits respectively.
B. z. macgillivrayi (North, 1900)		Identification: The yellow belly, lighter green colour and lack of red band distinguishes it from the mallee ringneck.	Found from the Lake Eyre basin in the Northern Territory to the Gulf Country of northwestern Queensland, from Burketown south to Boulia, with Kynuna and Camooweel as eastern and western limits respectively.
Mallee ringneck			Inhabits central and western New South Wales west of Dubbo, the southwestern corner Queensland west of St George, eastern South Australia and northwestern Victoria.
B. z. barnardi (Vigors & Horsfield, 1827)			Inhabits central and western New South Wales west of Dubbo, the southwestern corner Queensland west of St George, eastern South Australia and northwestern Victoria.

== Behaviour ==
The Australian ringneck is active during the day and can be found in eucalypt woodlands and eucalypt-lined watercourses. The species is gregarious and depending on the conditions can be resident or nomadic. In trials of growing hybrid eucalypt trees in dry environments parrots, especially the Port Lincoln parrot, caused severe damage to the crowns of the younger trees during the research period between 2000–2003.

=== Feeding ===
This species eats a wide range of foods that include nectar, insects, seeds, fruit, and native and introduced bulbs. It will eat orchard-grown fruit and is sometimes seen as a pest by farmers.

=== Breeding ===
Breeding season for the northern populations starts in June or July, while the central and southern populations breed from August to December, but this can be delayed when climatic conditions are unfavourable. The nesting site is a hollow in a tree trunk. Generally four or five white oval eggs are laid measuring 29 mm x 23 mm, although a clutch may be as few as three and as many as six. Fledgling survival rates have been measured at 75%.

== Conservation ==
Although the species is endemic, the species is considered not threatened, but in Western Australia, the Twenty-eight subspecies (B. z. semitorquatus) gets locally displaced by the introduced rainbow lorikeets that aggressively compete for nesting places. The rainbow lorikeet is considered a pest species in Western Australia and is subject to eradication in the wild.

In Western Australia, a licence is required to keep or dispose of more than four Port Lincoln ringnecks. All four subspecies are sold in the Canary Islands and in Australia, and they are traded via the CITES convention. The sale of the Cloncurry parrot is restricted in Queensland. The Australian ringneck can suffer from psittacine beak and feather disease, which causes a high nestling mortality rate in captivity.
