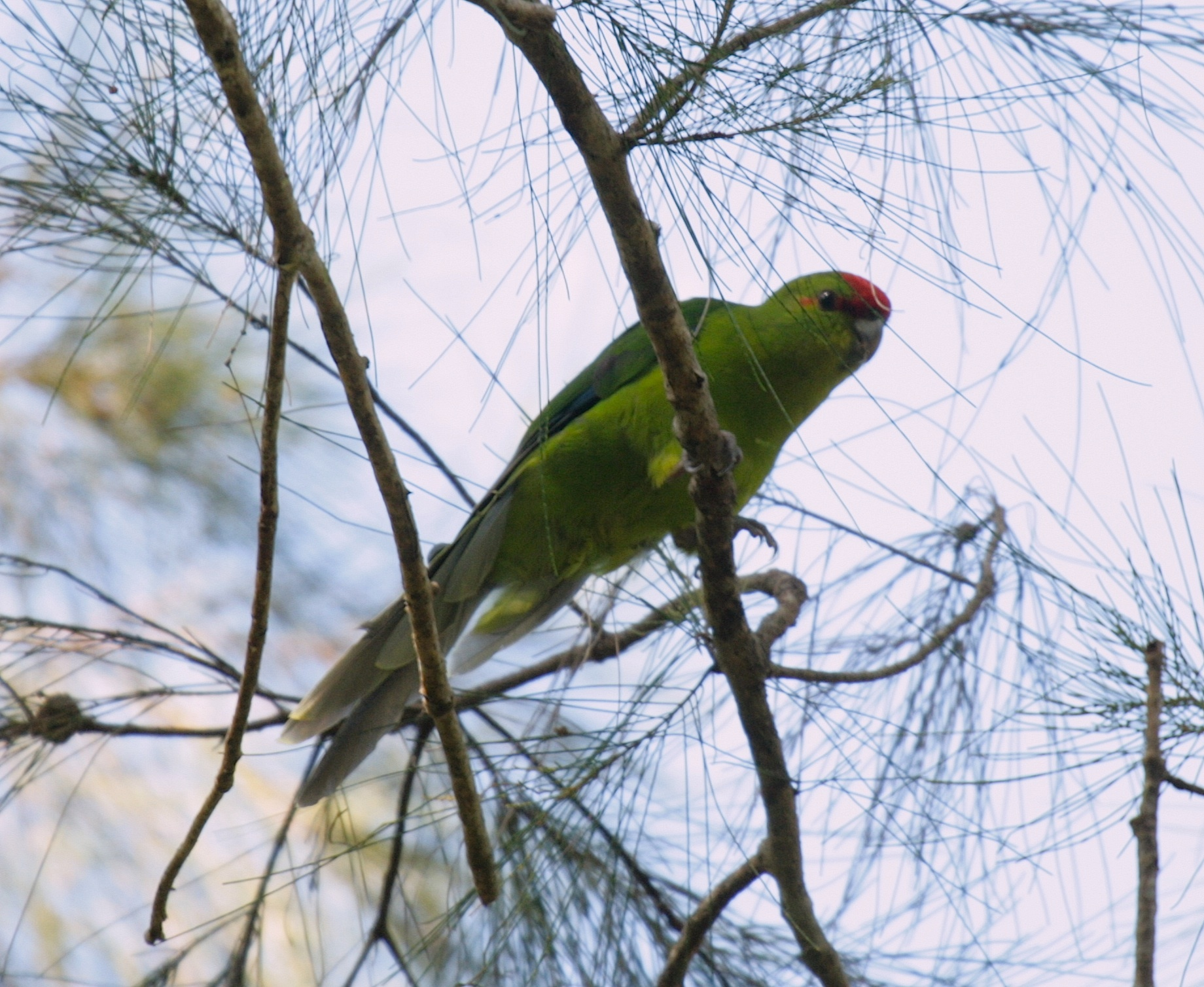
- CITES Appendix I

Scientific classification
- Kingdom: Animalia
- Phylum: Chordata
- Class: Aves
- Order: Psittaciformes
- Family: Psittaculidae
- Genus: Cyanoramphus
- Species: C. saisseti

Binomial name
- Cyanoramphus saisseti Verreaux & Des Murs, 1860

= New Caledonian kakariki =

Species of bird

The New Caledonian kakariki (Cyanoramphus saisseti), also known as the New Caledonian parakeet or New Caledonian red-crowned parakeet is a species of parrot in the family Psittaculidae. It is endemic to New Caledonia. The species was once considered to be conspecific with the red-fronted parakeet of New Zealand; it is now considered a full species, and is the sister species to all other species in the genus Cyanoramphus, which had its origins in New Caledonia.

== Taxonomy ==
The New Caledonian kakariki was formally described in 1860 as Cyanoramphus saisseti by the French ornithologists Jules Verreaux and Marc Des Murs based on specimens from New Caledonia. The number of specimens they used is unclear, but they had at least one specimen of each sex. The New Caledonian kakariki was formerly considered to be the same species as the red-crowned kakariki, Norfolk parakeet, and Reischek's kakariki. However, genetic studies revealed that the New Caledonian kakariki was the sister lineage to all other species in its genus, and it is now usually considered a distinct species. The New Caledonian kakariki is most closely related to the Norfolk parakeet.

== Distribution and habitat ==
The New Caledonian kakariki is endemic to the island of Grande Terre in New Caledonia, inhabiting an area of around 2800 square kilometres across the island. Historically, the species inhabited all forested habitats on the island. Today, it prefers oligotrophic rainforests growing on both ultramafic and non-ultramafic soil over all other habitats. It spends more time in bushes and on the ground than other New Caledonian parakeets.

== Mating ==
The breeding season lasts from September to April, with the kakarikis laying eggs from October to February, hatching taking place from October to March, and fledging occurring from November to April. Nests are made in tree hollows or cracks in rocks. Nests have 2–5 eggs, which are laid over a period of two days and then incubated by the female for an average of 21 days before they hatch. The kakariki has a polyandrous breeding system, with two males, one larger and one smaller, breeding with the female. Both males help feed the female while she is incubating and all three adults feed nestlings after hatching. Nestlings fledge after an average of 39 days, after which they are fed by adults for another month.
