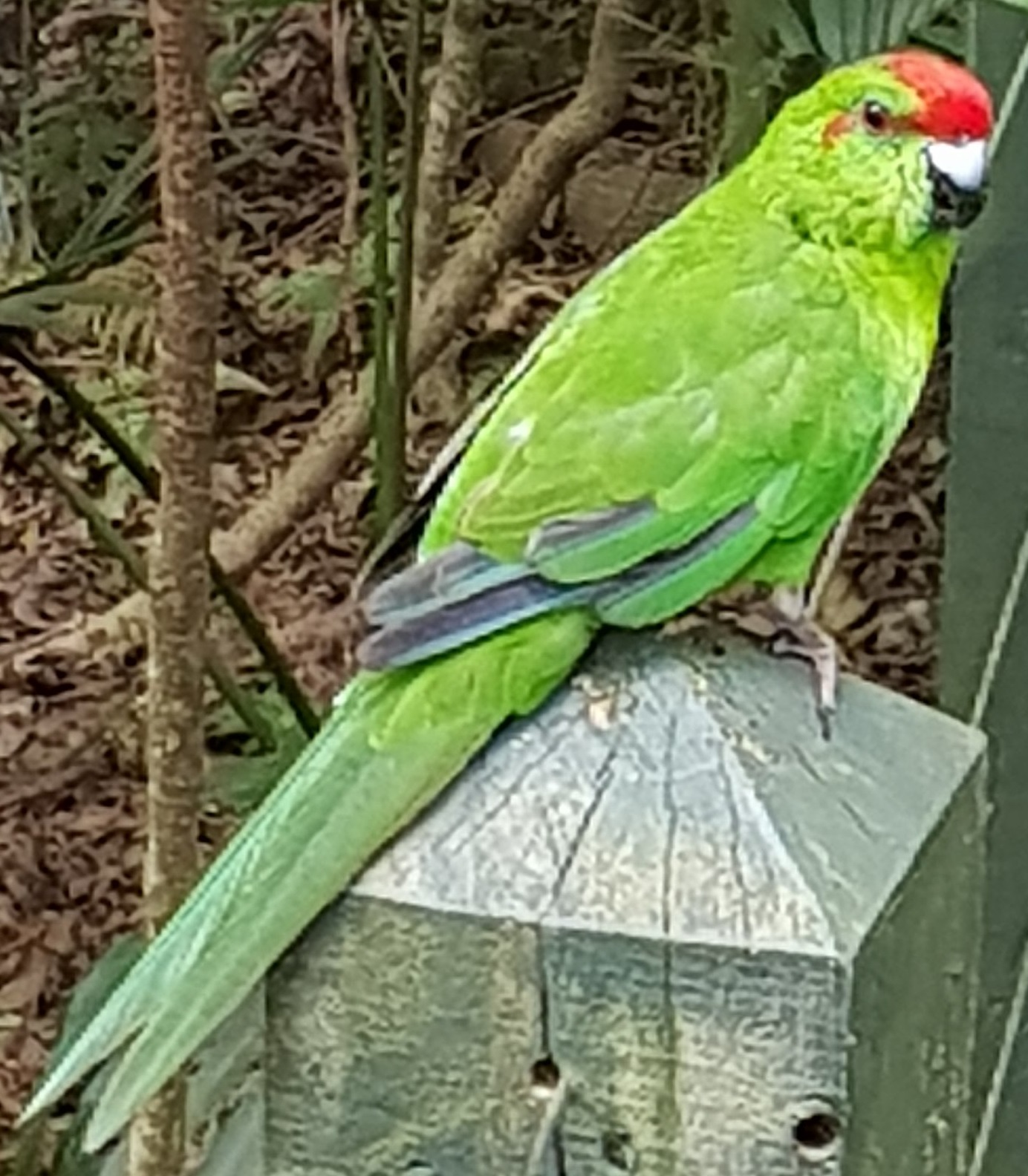
- On Norfolk Island, Australia
- CITES Appendix I

Scientific classification
- Kingdom: Animalia
- Phylum: Chordata
- Class: Aves
- Order: Psittaciformes
- Family: Psittaculidae
- Genus: Cyanoramphus
- Species: C. cookii

Binomial name
- Cyanoramphus cookii (Gray, 1859)

Synonyms
- Cyanoramphus novaezelandiae (Sparrman, 1787); Platycercus Cookii (Gray, GR, 1859); Cyanoramphus saisseti Verreaux & Des Murs, 1860

= Norfolk parakeet =

Species of bird

The Norfolk parakeet (Cyanoramphus cookii), also called Tasman parakeet, Norfolk Island green parrot or Norfolk Island red-crowned parakeet, is a species of parrot in the family Psittaculidae. It is endemic to Norfolk Island (located between Australia, New Zealand and New Caledonia in the Tasman Sea). A subspecies, the Lord Howe parakeet, became extinct in the 19^{th} century.

== Taxonomy ==
George Robert Gray described the Norfolk parakeet in 1859 as Platycercus Cookii, from a specimen in William Bullock's museum, and recorded it as from New Zealand. The species name honours James Cook, who reported the species on Norfolk Island when he landed there in 1774, noting it was the same as those occurring in New Zealand. In 1862, Gray described a specimen from Norfolk Island as Platycercus rayneri, collected by a Mr Rayner. In 1891, Italian ornithologist Tommaso Salvadori confirmed the two taxa as synonymous and coming from Norfolk Island.

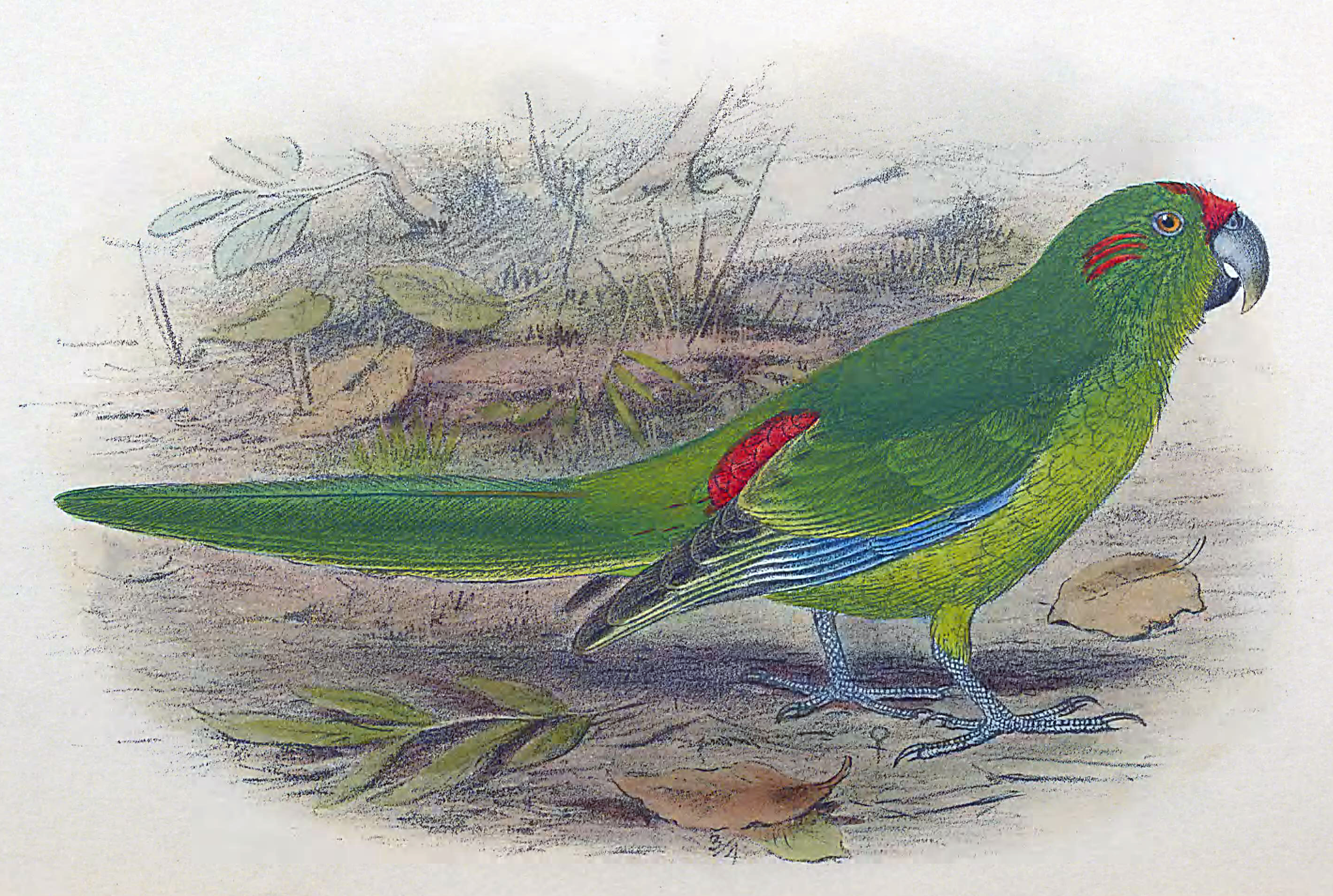
Illustration of the extinct Lord Howe Island subspecies by Henrik Grønvold

It was long considered a subspecies of the red-crowned kakariki of New Zealand. Ornithologists Alfred North (1893) and Graeme Phipps (1981) noted that the Norfolk parakeet was significantly larger than the red-fronted kakariki. Phipps added that further investigation was needed into their status and conservation. DNA analysis in 2001 showed that it was an early offshoot from the other parakeets in the genus Cyanoramphus, with only the New Caledonian and Chatham Islands kakariki more divergent.

The Norfolk parakeet is also known as Norfolk Island green parrot, and locally as green parrot. The name "Tasman parakeet" is used by ornithologists Les Christidis and Walter E. Boles on the argument that this species and the Lord Howe parakeet (Cyanoramphus novaezelandiae subflavescens) are probably a single species for which they use biogeographical arguments. Tasman is used for other species with the same distribution and they propose that name for that reason. However, the latter subspecies was not included in the genus-wide phylogenetic reconstruction using DNA sequences, and the lumping of the species should be considered tentative.

Two subspecies are recognised:

- C. c. cookii (Gray, 1859) – Norfolk Island (east of Australia)
- † C. c. subflavescens Salvadori, 1891 – Lord Howe parakeet – formerly Lord Howe Island (east of Australia); extinct, last recorded 1860s

The Lord Howe parakeet was formally described in 1891 by the Italian zoologist Tommaso Salvadori under the binomial name Cyanoramphus subflavescens. It was formerly considered as a subspecies of the red-crowned kakariki (Cyanoramphus novaezelandiae). The parrot was abundant on the island, but was persecuted by the early settlers because of its raids on their crops and gardens. It was last recorded in 1869. Only two specimens of the Lord Howe parakeet exist. They come from the John Gould collection, taken by John MacGillivray in September 1853 on the voyage of HMS Herald, and are held in the Natural History Museum.

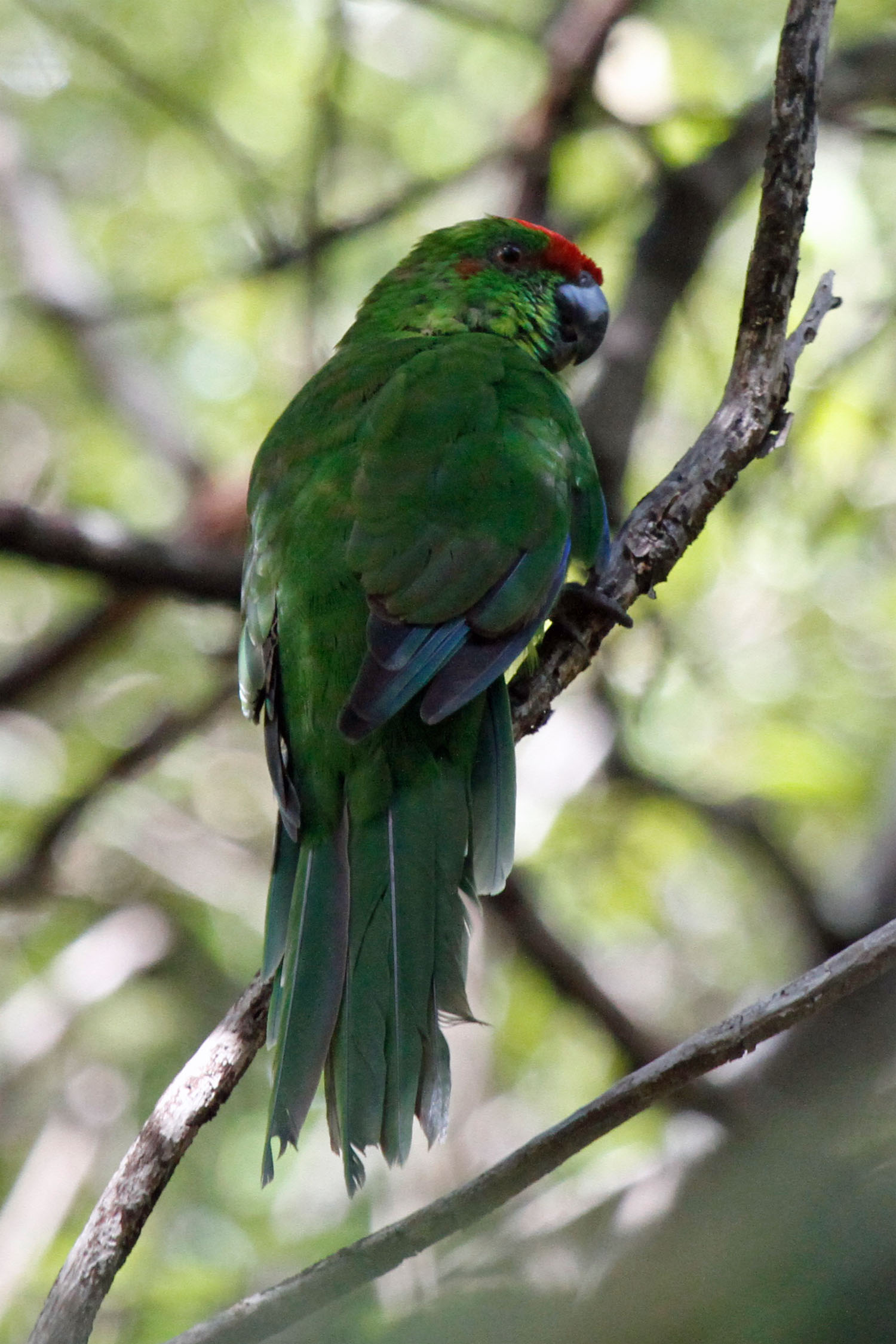
In Norfolk Island National Park

== Distribution and habitat ==
Originally found throughout Norfolk Island (to which it is endemic), it vanished from much of its range until by 1908 it was restricted to forest around Mount Pitt in the northwestern corner of the Island. Its natural habitats are native rainforest, from which it ventures into surrounding plantations and orchards.

== Diet ==
Seeds make up over half the Norfolk parakeet's diet, particularly in winter. Five species make up 85% of its diet, including the Norfolk pine (Araucaria heterophylla), niau palm (Rhopalostylis baueri), ake ake (Dodonaea viscosa), as well as the introduced African olive (Olea europaea subsp. cuspidata) and cherry guava (Psidium cattleyanum).

== Threats ==
Once a common species, the Norfolk parakeet had dwindled to under 50 birds by the late 1970s. Factors contributing to its decline include habitat loss, particularly of large old trees with suitable hollows for breeding, killing of eggs and young by rats and cats, shooting by early settlers, and competition for nest sites by introduced crimson rosellas and common starlings. In 1983 a captive breeding program was commenced. Although it was not successful, it sparked interest in the bird's fate in the people of Norfolk Island.

Between 1987 and 2000, a concerted effort to reduce rat and cat populations by trapping, and construction of nesting boxes designed to keep out rats increased parrot numbers, with around 250 young fledged. However, numbers of Norfolk parakeets were difficult to assess and concern was raised between 2009 and 2012 that it might be declining again. A census in 2009 estimated a count of 240 birds.

It is only found in Norfolk Island National Park and the surrounding area.
