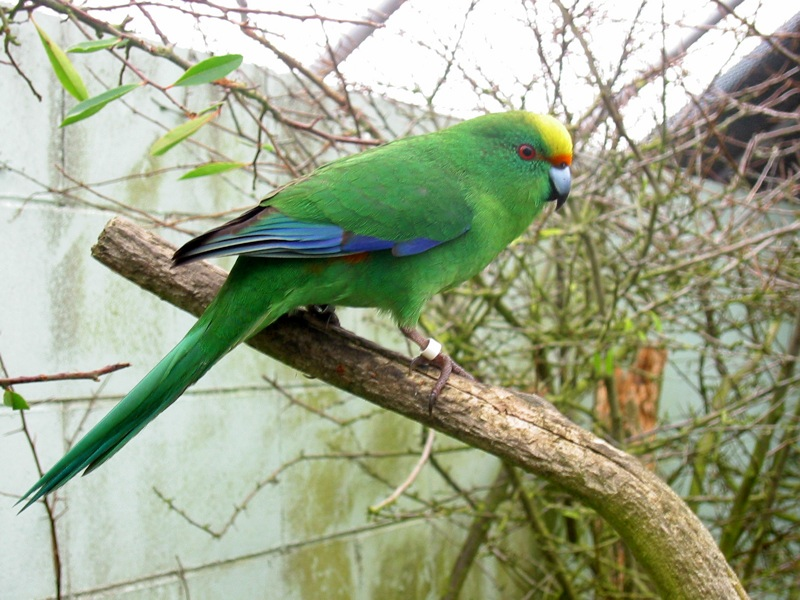
- At Isaac Peacock Springs wildlife refuge, New Zealand

Conservation status
- Critically Endangered (IUCN 3.1)
- CITES Appendix II

Scientific classification
- Kingdom: Animalia
- Phylum: Chordata
- Class: Aves
- Order: Psittaciformes
- Family: Psittaculidae
- Genus: Cyanoramphus
- Species: C. malherbi

Binomial name
- Cyanoramphus malherbi Souancé, 1857

= Orange-fronted kakariki =

Species of New Zealand bird

The orange-fronted kakariki (Cyanoramphus malherbi), also known as orange-fronted parakeet or Malherbe's parakeet, is a small parrot endemic to New Zealand. It is known in te reo māori as kākāriki karaka or orange-fronted kākāriki, with kākāriki translating to 'small parrot' and the colour green. The species has a similar name to the "orange-fronted parakeet" with Eupsittula canicularis, a Central American species. Restricted to a few valleys in the South Island, its population declined to around 200 in the 1990s, and it is considered critically endangered by the International Union for Conservation of Nature, and Nationally Critical by the New Zealand Threat Classification System. The kakariki has since been translocated to several islands and a fenced mainland site.

== Taxonomy ==
The genus Cyanoramphus is endemic to New Zealand and surrounding islands and it has been proposed that the ancestor of Cyanoramphus dispersed from New Caledonia to New Zealand via Norfolk Island 500,000 years ago.

Controversy has surrounded the classification of this bird, as to whether it is a distinct species, or a colour morph of the similar yellow-crowned kakariki (C. auriceps). It was described in 1857 from a museum specimen of unknown origin; its species name honours French ornithologist Alfred Malherbe. During the late 1800s, ornithologists considered it to be a distinct species, but during the latter half of the 20th century, it was often considered a colour morph; as recently as 1990, the Ornithological Society of New Zealand listed it as a form of C. auriceps. After analysis using molecular genetic methods in 2000, the current consensus among researchers, which is accepted by the New Zealand Department of Conservation, is that C. malherbi is a distinct species.

== Description ==
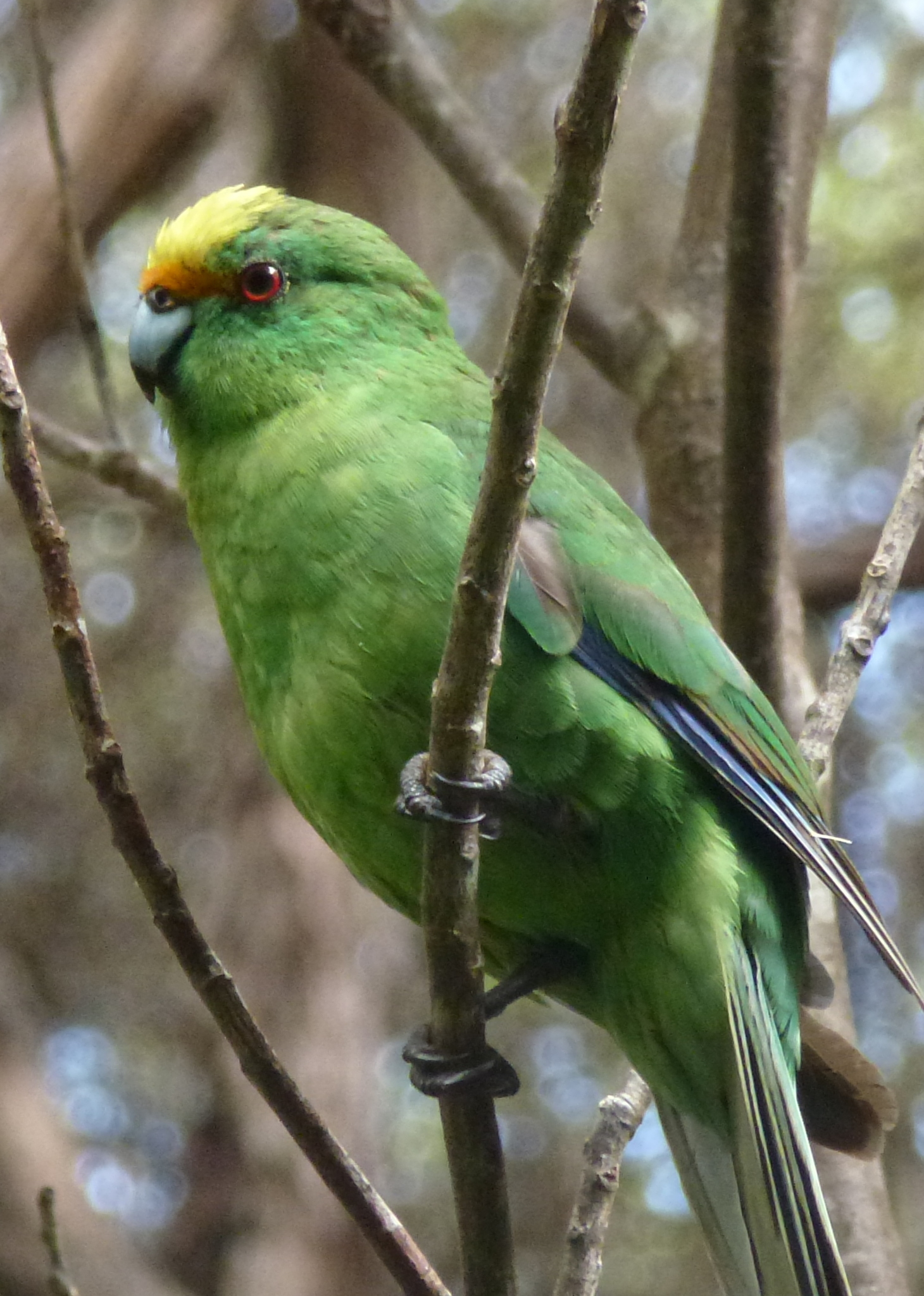
Adult with its orange frontal band

The orange-fronted kakariki is a medium-sized parrot, about 20 cm long. Its body is primarily a bright blue-green, with azure blue primary covert and leading-edge feathers on its wings.

It has a distinctive (and diagnostic) orange frontal band with a lemon yellow crown, but this is absent in juvenile birds, which have a band of pale yellow. The orange frontal band begins to develop when the bird is 2–5 weeks old. Its rump has orange patches on the sides. Colouration in males tends to be brighter, and juveniles are distinctly duller.

The only reliable features that separate mature orange-fronted kakarikis from the similar yellow-crowned kakarikis (C. auriceps) are the colour of the frontal band and rump, though there are more subtle differences in size, plumage colour and habits.

== Distribution and habitat ==
The species is found in only three regions on New Zealand's South Island: the South Branch Hurunui River Valley, Hawdon River Valley, and the Poulter Valley. In addition, kākāriki karaka have been translocated to Te Hoiere / Maud Island, Oruawairua / Blumine Island, Chalky Island, Mayor Island / Tūhua, Pukenui / Anchor Island and the Brook Waimārama Sanctuary in Nelson. Several of these island populations no longer persist with only Blumine and Brook Waimārama Sanctuary carrying significant populations, and Anchor Island still in the establishment phase .

In the South Island, the kakariki is predominantly found only in Nothofagus/Fuscospora (beech) forest with some reports from alpine and subalpine tussock and open matagouri shrubland.

== Behaviour ==
The kakariki is most often observed foraging, preening, and resting. It prefers the upper-middle stratum of forests, but also frequents lower strata more often than C. auriceps.

=== Diet and feeding ===
The orange-fronted kakariki typically feeds in the canopy of New Zealand beech trees, but also forages in low vegetation and on the ground. It is typically observed feeding in flocks of mixed species, eating various seeds, beech flowers, buds, and invertebrates.

During spring, invertebrates become a significant part of their diet, including leaf roller moth and fungus moth caterpillars, other Lepidoptera, and aphids. They have been observed feeding on herbs and ferns on the ground, including Lobelia species, Oreomyrrhis colensoi, Parahebe lyallii, Leptinella maniototo and Blechnum penna-marina. During mast years, beech seeds become the dominant feature of their diet.

The Maud Island population appeared to have different dietary preferences to mainland populations, eating more plant species and fewer invertebrates.

=== Breeding ===
Orange-fronted kakarikis are monogamous and able to nest year-round, but peak breeding is between December and April. They primarily nest in natural hollows or cavities of mature beech trees, often in red beech (Fuscospora fusca). On Maud Island they were found to nest in Pinus radiata forests.

Clutch size is around seven eggs with an incubation period of 21–26 days. The female exclusively incubates and the male feeds her. Nestlings fledge between 43 and 71 days, but remain dependent for 2–4 weeks.

Their breeding is also linked to the production of beech seed during mast years. During seeding events, and other periods where food is plentiful, they are able to produce secondary clutches, with some pairs reportedly breeding up to four times in succession.

== Status ==
The orange-fronted kakariki was classified as Nationally Critical by the New Zealand Department of Conservation in 2021 and critically endangered by the IUCN.

In the 19th century, the species was widespread, occurring throughout New Zealand's South Island. The birds, along with other members of their genus, reportedly flocked en masse into rural areas, feeding on orchards and crops. This behaviour, likely a result of population booms driven by the masting of beech forests, has ceased since the extirpation of these species from much of the mainland.

Prior to 2000, the parrot's population numbered in the hundreds in the South Island, but fell from 500–700 individuals to an estimated 100–200 by 2004, due to significant increases in rat and stoat populations, in particular a rat plague during 2001.

The Hawdon River Valley houses 70–200 individuals reported in 2013, but numbers are apparently decreasing. The Poulter Valley population also declined in 2013, with roughly 40–80 individuals now occurring in this region. The South Branch Hurunui River Valley population is even smaller, as few as 20–40 birds. The current stronghold for this species is the Brook Waimārama Sanctuary, numbering upwards of 300 individuals. The population continues to grow due to the pest-free habitat afforded by the pest-resistant fence.

The world population of this species was estimated to be 290–690 individuals in 2013, with translocated island populations making up 160–420 of these birds. Determining exact numbers of the orange-fronted kakariki is difficult, however, due to their rarity, quiet nature, and similarities to C. auriceps.

=== Threats ===
The original decline in population was most likely due to habitat destruction and fragmentation by human activity, hunting, and primarily, predation from exotic species. The biggest limitation of this species today is predation by introduced mammalian pests.

Orange-fronted parakeets evolved in isolation from land mammals, so are especially vulnerable to introduced predators. Their current decline is due to predation from stoats (Mustela ermine), rats (Rattus spp.), and brushtail possums (Trichosurus vulpecula) , which target eggs and nestlings. One population was reduced by 85% in 2001 due to predator irruption after a beech mast (a season of high production by southern beech). Deer and possums also contribute to the decline of kākāriki karaka through forest destruction.

Competition for food may also be a factor. Introduced birds, mice, wasps, and rats are considerably reducing invertebrate numbers, on which the kakariki relies during winter and spring. The parakeet is a food generalist, though, and may compensate with other food sources, as observed on Maud Island. This dietary flexibility is promising for the species' recovery.

Inbreeding depression and low genetic diversity may affect the viability of these small populations by reducing their capacity to adapt to threats and diseases.

The specialised nesting habitat of the orange-fronted kakariki increases its vulnerability to extinction. The reasons for this include: (1) a single nest opening means that incubating females may be unable to escape from invading predators and will also be killed, (2) because only females incubate, predation may cause a biased sex ratio, (3) their relatively long nesting period (when compared to other parakeets) increases their vulnerability to predation. Introduced starlings may also be outcompeting the parrot for nesting sites.

=== Conservation ===
The orange-fronted kakariki is protected under New Zealand's Wildlife Act 1953. The species is also listed under Appendix II of the Convention on International Trade in Endangered Species of Wild Fauna and Flora (CITES) meaning international export/import (including parts and derivatives) is regulated.

Predator management is the main strategy to reverse this species' decline. All three mainland populations come under the "Operation Ark" initiative, which controls stoat, possum, and rat populations through integrated pest management, with particular focus on reducing the effect of predator plagues. These pest-management strategies have worked with other New Zealand bird species to reduce predation by introduced mammals.

Individual nest sites are also protected from predators using metal tree-trunk wraps; this has been a successful programme and only one nest out of 153 has been lost to predators since 2003.

The other major conservation strategy is captive-breeding programmes carried out at Peacock Springs by the Isaac Wildlife Trust, with individuals being released on predator-free islands. Birds are placed in portable aviaries in the forest to acclimatise them before release.

A total of 45 birds was released between 2005 and 2007 on Chalky Island, off the coast of Fiordland. The local population had increased to 150 individuals in 2009, and 100–200 by 2011, but had declined to 50–150 individuals in 2013.

Sixty-eight individuals were released on Maud Island in the Marlborough Sounds between 2007 and 2009, but in 2013, the island's population consisted of only 10–20 birds.

Orange-fronted kakarikis have also been translocated to Mayor Island / Tūhua in the Bay of Plenty and Blumine Island in the Marlborough Sounds; estimated population in 2013 were 50–150 and 50–100 birds, respectively. The Blumine population is the most secure island site today.A recent translocation to Anchor Island in Fiordland is still in an establishment phase.

A population of kākāriki karaka has been established at the Brook Waimārama Sanctuary near Nelson through seven translocations (to March 2023) totalling 125 birds from several of the other populations. The 690 hectare sanctuary is free of all introduced mammals except for mice, with two thirds intact mature beech forest.
