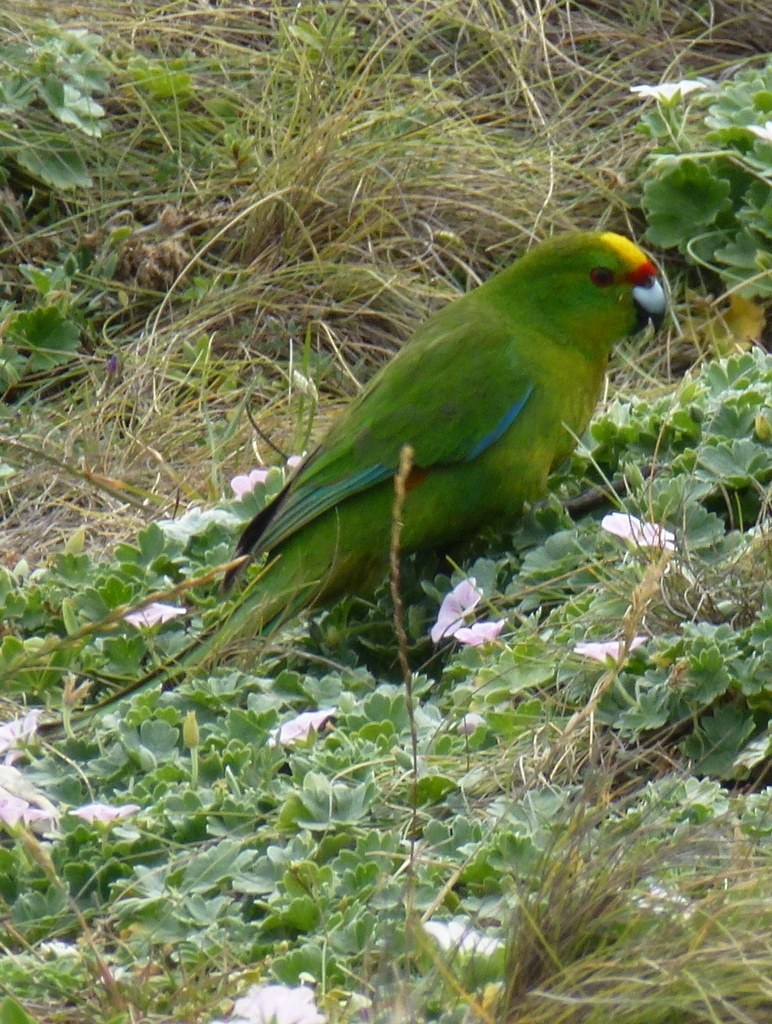

Conservation status
- Vulnerable (IUCN 3.1)
- CITES Appendix I

Scientific classification
- Kingdom: Animalia
- Phylum: Chordata
- Class: Aves
- Order: Psittaciformes
- Family: Psittaculidae
- Genus: Cyanoramphus
- Species: C. forbesi

Binomial name
- Cyanoramphus forbesi Rothschild, 1893

= Chatham Islands kakariki =

Species of bird

The Chatham Islands kakariki (Cyanoramphus forbesi), also known as the Chatham Islands parakeet or Forbes' parakeet, is a rare species endemic to the Chatham Islands group, New Zealand. This kakariki is one of New Zealand's rarest birds and is classified as Vulnerable on the IUCN Red List, as a result of a range of threats to the species survival, including habitat loss, predation, and hybridization. A number of conservation methods have been employed to assist the recovery of this species, and currently the population trend is considered stable.

== Taxonomy ==
Walter Rothschild described the species in 1893.

Chatham Islands kakariki is one of ten species in the genus Cyanoramphus, a genus consisting of kakarikis from New Zealand and surrounding islands. Originally classified as a distinct species (Cyanoramphus forbesi) the Chatham Islands kakariki was later thought to be a subspecies of the yellow-crowned kakariki (Cyanoramphus auriceps) and was renamed Cyanoramphus auriceps forbesi. The Chatham Islands kakariki has since been the subject of a range of molecular tests to determine the correct classification of the bird. These tests have resulted in C. forbesi being reinstated as a separate species to C. auriceps, on the basis of genetic variations, as well as morphological differences such as size and vocalisations.

=== Hybridisation ===
Mitochondrial DNA analysis and microsatellite genetic markers have both indicated a high degree of hybridisation between the Chatham Islands kakariki and the red-crowned kakariki (Cyanoramphus novaezelandiae chathamensis), which is also found on Mangere Island in the Chatham Islands.

== Description ==
Chatham Islands kakarikis are medium-sized parakeets, with long tails and orange-red eyes. Plumage is bright green, with a red band across the forehead (but not reaching the eyes) and a yellow forecrown. The lores are also green, and the bird has some red plumage on the sides of the rump, and violet-blue outer primaries and wing coverts. The female parakeet is slightly smaller than the male, which is also reflected in her smaller bill size.

The Chatham Islands kakariki is easily distinguished from the Chatham Island red-crowned parakeet by its golden-yellow forecrown, as like its name suggests the Chatham Island red-crowned parakeet has a red forecrown. It is also distinguishable from the yellow-crowned parakeet (Cyanoramphus auriceps) despite looking quite similar, as C. auriceps is not found in the Chatham Islands.

== Distribution and habitat ==
The Chatham Islands kakariki is found only on Mangere and Little Mangere (Tapuaenuku) Islands in the Chatham Islands group. The Chatham Islands are sovereign land of New Zealand, and lay to the South-east of Wellington.

Historically, the Chatham Islands kakariki was documented in the 1800s to have travelled to nearby Pitt Island and southern Chatham Island. The species was extinct on Mangere Island by 1930 as a result of significant deforestation. However, the species persisted on Little Mangere Island, until recolonizing Mangere Island in the 1960s after the removal of introduced species (such as cats, rabbits and grazing livestock) and after the native vegetation had a chance to grow back.

The parakeet is found in dense forest and scrub, and utilizes tree hollows and rock crevices to nest.

== Conservation ==
The Chatham Islands kakariki is absolutely protected under New Zealand's Wildlife Act 1953. The species is also listed under Appendix I of the Convention on International Trade in Endangered Species of Wild Fauna and Flora (CITES) meaning international export/import (including parts and derivatives) is regulated.

The Chatham Islands kakariki has faced a number of threats to its survival, with the population once falling as low as 20–30 individuals. These threats include deforestation and habitat destruction, the introduction of predators, and the fact that the entire population is confined to two small islands in the Chatham Islands group-Mangere and Little Mangere Islands, which are only 112 ha and 16 ha respectively.

Massive deforestation of Mangere Island has had a significant impact on the population of the Chatham Islands kakariki, as the environmental boundaries (like differing habitat preference) that once separated the Chatham Islands kakariki from the Chatham Island red-crowned kakariki were no longer in place. Deforestation and the creation of open farmland meant the Chatham Islands kakariki was being deprived of the forest habitat it prefers. As the Chatham Island red-crowned kakariki was better able to adapt to these new changes in habitat than the Chatham Islands kakariki, they were able to colonize new areas of the island, including habitat that was previously only occupied by the Chatham Islands kakariki. As a result, competition for habitat and breeding resources (such as mates) has driven the increased rate of hybridisation between these two species, effectively affecting the genetic makeup of the population of both of these Cyanoramphus species. This is particularly threatening to the C. forbesi population as it is not found anywhere else and therefore runs the risk of essentially being bred out as a species.

To prevent the further genetic loss of the Chatham Islands kakariki due to hybridisation, both hybrids and Chatham Island red-crowned parakeets were culled on Mangere Island as of 1976. These culls took place routinely until the population of hybrid birds and C. n. chathamensis reached levels that were considered not to be an immediate threat to the C. forbesi population. Eliminating these birds also reduced the amount of competition for resources like food and habitat, and gave the Chatham Islands kakariki numbers a chance to increase. Currently the population of hybrid birds is monitored, and culls will resume if the number of hybrid birds on Mangere Island reaches 10% of the total number of parakeets on the island. The islands inhabited by the Chatham Islands kakariki have also undergone reforestation efforts (of approximately 6000 trees annually since 1976) to boost natural habitat for the species and to add a degree of separation between them and C. n. chathamensis species which prefer more open habitat when given the choice.

== Behaviour ==
The Chatham Islands kakariki is typically seen singly or in pairs, but rarely in groups. The birds are considered sedentary, and remain at a single nesting site throughout the year.

=== Diet ===
The diet of Chatham Islands kakarikis consists of invertebrates, flowers, seeds, leaves, fruit, shoots and bark. They have been noted feeding in the forest canopy and on the forest floor, as well as in trees, shrubs or other plants when fruiting, seeding or flowering. The Chatham Islands kakariki feeds both individually and in groups with conspecifics, as well as with Chatham Island red-crowned parakeets and hybrids of the two species.

=== Reproduction ===
Chatham Islands kakariki nests in hollows of dead or living trees, and breed between October and March. The birds become quite territorial of boundaries when breeding, chasing other birds away from the area and making loud vocalisations. The female bird will stay in the nest during incubation, and the male will bring her food. Clutch size is between 2-9 eggs, and once the eggs hatch both the male and the female adult birds will share parental care of the offspring. When provided with nest boxes, the species has a high rate of chick mortality, though it is unclear why this may be the case.
