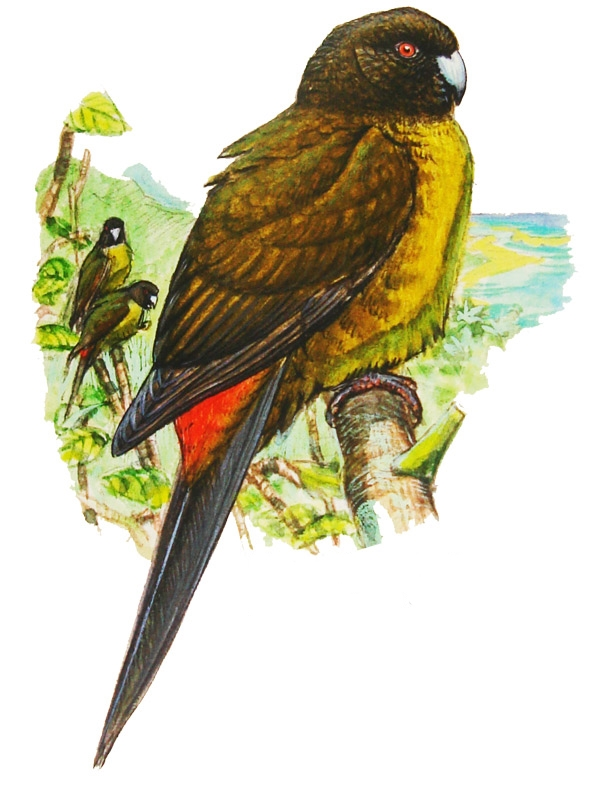

Conservation status
- Extinct (c. 1777) (IUCN 3.1)

Scientific classification
- Kingdom: Animalia
- Phylum: Chordata
- Class: Aves
- Order: Psittaciformes
- Family: Psittaculidae
- Genus: Cyanoramphus
- Species: †C. ulietanus

Binomial name
- †Cyanoramphus ulietanus (J. F. Gmelin, 1788)

Synonyms
- Psittacus ulietanus J. F. Gmelin, 1789; Platycercus tannaensis Finsch, 1868; Psittacus fuscatus von Pelzeln, 1873

= Raiatea kakariki =

Raiatea parakeet

Extinct bird of the Society Islands

The Raiatea kakariki (Cyanoramphus ulietanus), also known as the Raiatea parakeet, Society parakeet or brown-headed parakeet, is an extinct parakeet of the genus Cyanoramphus.

== Description ==
The Raiatea kakariki averaged 25 cm (9.75 to 10 inches) in length. Its head was chocolate brown, paler on the neck, rump, and wings. The bill showed a pale bluish grey hue and had a black tip. The lower back and tail coverts exhibited a rufous brown colouring. The underwing coverts and outer webs to flight feathers were greyish blue. The breast, abdomen, and undertail coverts were olive yellow. The mid-rectrices were olive brown and outer rectrices grey. The irises were orange red in adults and brown in juveniles. The feet were greyish brown. Males and females were not sexually dimorphic.

== Distribution and habitat ==
The Raiatea kakariki was endemic to Raiatea, the second largest island of the Society Islands. It was probably a forest species, as this was the native habitat on this island.

== Status ==
It is presumed to have gone extinct shortly after its discovery in 1773. The causes of its decline were likely habitat loss due to forest clearing, hunting, and invasive species.

There are only two museum specimens known to exist. The date of their origin was discussed, with Erwin Stresemann (1950) and James Greenway (1958) suggesting 1773 or 1774. However, in 1979 the ornithologist David G. Medway from New Zealand claimed that the two specimens were taken in November 1777 during the third circumnavigation by James Cook. He based the claim on the travel diary entries by Joseph Banks. The specimens are in the Natural History Museum in London and in the Naturhistorisches Museum, Vienna.
