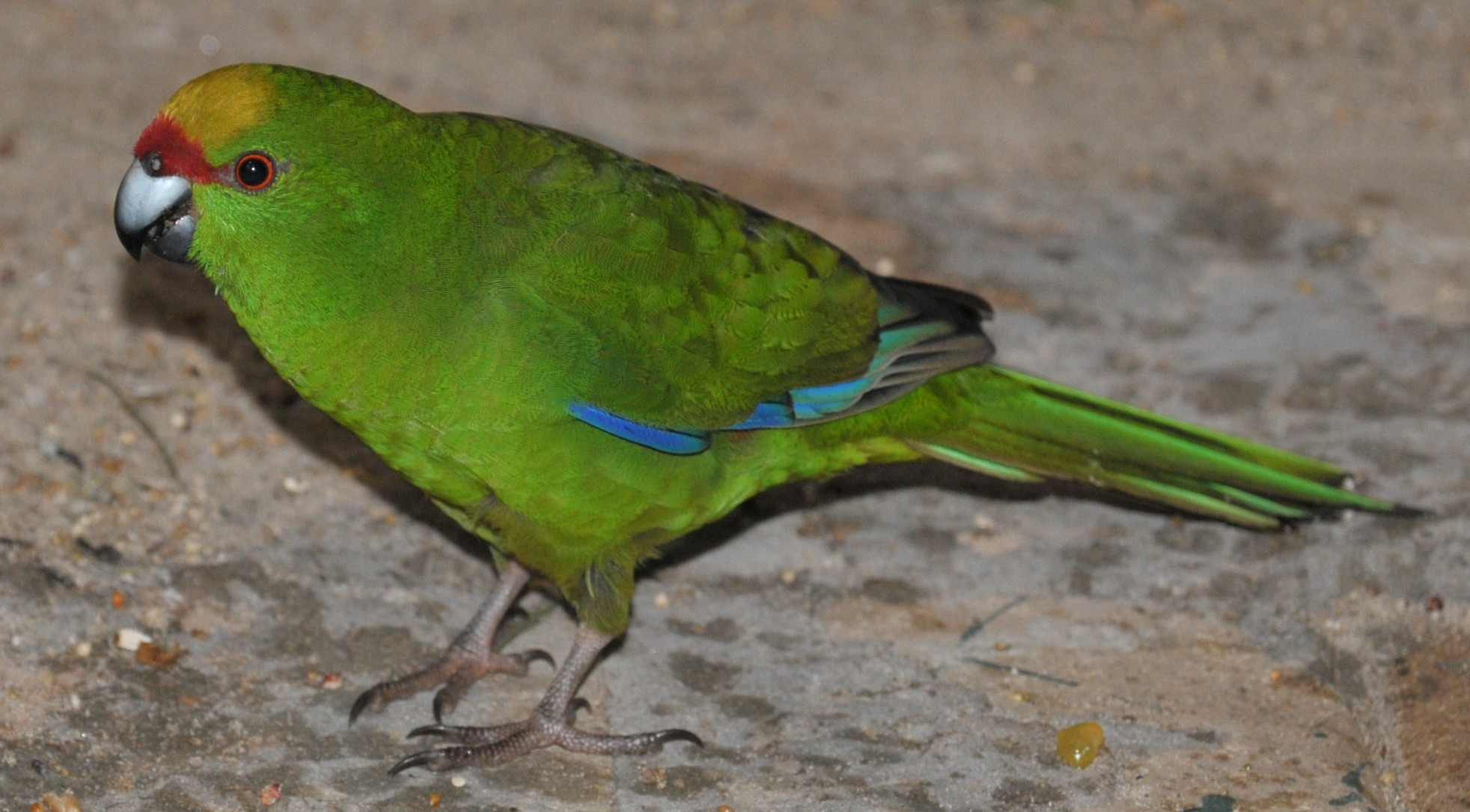
- In captivity

Conservation status
- Near Threatened (IUCN 3.1)
- CITES Appendix II

Scientific classification
- Kingdom: Animalia
- Phylum: Chordata
- Class: Aves
- Order: Psittaciformes
- Family: Psittaculidae
- Genus: Cyanoramphus
- Species: C. auriceps

Binomial name
- Cyanoramphus auriceps (Kuhl, 1820)

Synonyms
- Psittacus auriceps

= Yellow-crowned kakariki =

Species of bird

The yellow-crowned kakariki (Cyanoramphus auriceps), also known as the yellow-crowned parakeet or yellow-fronted parakeet, is a species of bird endemic to the islands of New Zealand. The species is found across the main three islands of New Zealand, North Island, South Island and Stewart Island/Rakiura, as well as on the subantarctic Auckland Islands. It has declined due to predation from introduced species such as stoats, although unlike the red-crowned kakariki, it has not been extirpated from the mainland of New Zealand. Its Māori name is kākāriki.

== History ==
The yellow-crowned kakariki was once widely distributed across all of New Zealand, both the main islands and the outlying ones. However, due to both the aforementioned introduced mammals and human destruction of habitat, these kakarikis have become much scarcer in the last few decades. While uncommon, they are still the most common kakariki in New Zealand.

== Taxonomy ==
This species was first described by Heinrich Kuhl in 1820 and originally named Psittacus auriceps.

== Description ==
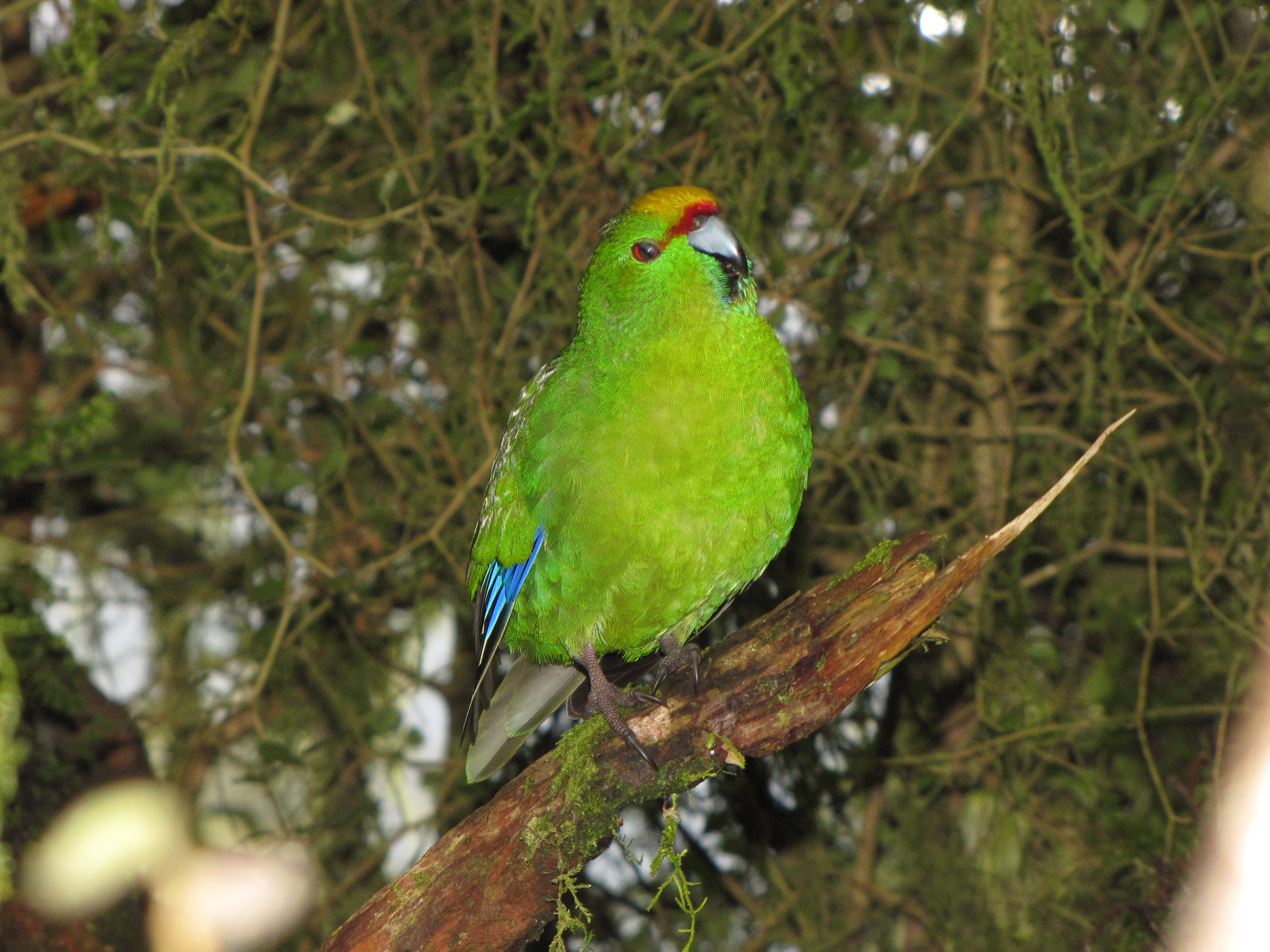
Yellow-crowned kakariki near Lake Matheson, New Zealand

Yellow-crowned kakarikis are 23 cm long and primarily bright green. They have a red band fronting their eponymous golden crown. Their wings, when spread in flight, are bluish purple. Their eyes are either orange or red and their bill is grey.

The males of this species are larger than the females. The females can also be distinguished from males as their bills are disproportionally smaller.

== Range and habitat ==
Yellow-crowned kakarikis prefer the upper canopies of tall, unbroken stub and forest, though they have been observed at high-altitude tussock meadows and on some of the subantarctic islands. A notably favoured habitat is mixed podocarp and southern beech (Nothofagus) forest. The preference of C. auriceps for the upper canopies may have placed it at an advantage in comparison to the red-crowned kakariki, as it likely reduced the risk from predators.

These kakarikis are endemic to New Zealand and range across the main islands, as well as Ewing Island in the Auckland Islands. This is the world's most southern observed location of Cyanoramphus, and the second-southernmost location of living parrots.

== Diet ==
Yellow-crowned kakarikis subsist on the seeds of beech, flax, and tussock, but also eat fruits, flowers, leaves, shoots, and invertebrates.

== Reproduction ==
These birds build nests in crevices, burrows, and trunks of trees depending on the habitat. Their eggs are white.

== Conservation ==
The yellow-crowned kakariki is absolutely protected under New Zealand's Wildlife Act 1953. The species is also listed under Appendix II of the Convention on International Trade in Endangered Species of Wild Fauna and Flora (CITES) meaning international export/import (including parts and derivatives) is regulated.
