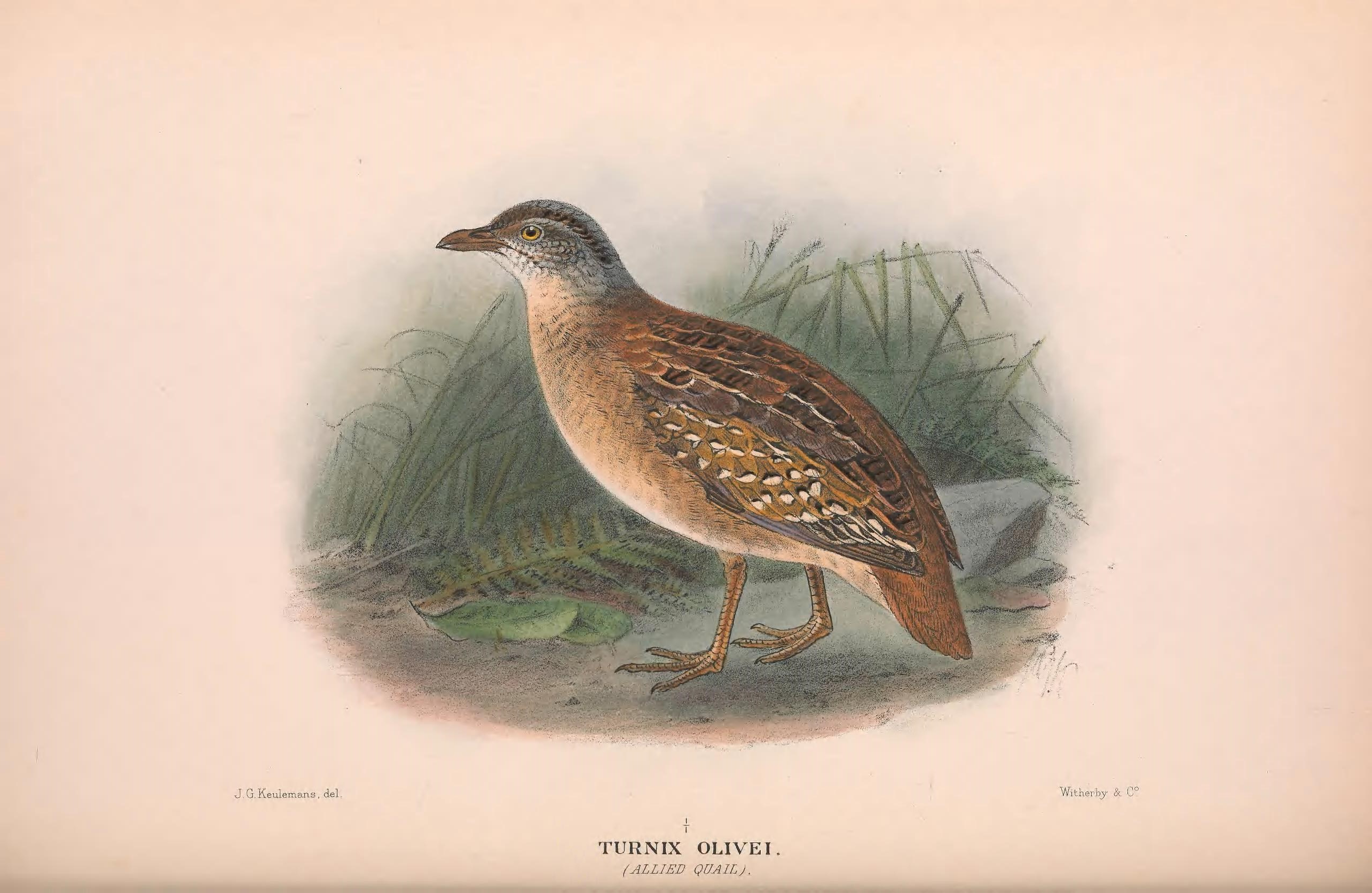
- Turnix olivii

Conservation status
- Critically Endangered (IUCN 3.1)

Scientific classification
- Kingdom: Animalia
- Phylum: Chordata
- Class: Aves
- Order: Charadriiformes
- Family: Turnicidae
- Genus: Turnix
- Species: T. olivii

Binomial name
- Turnix olivii Robinson, 1900

= Buff-breasted buttonquail =

Species of bird

The buff-breasted buttonquail (Turnix olivii) is the largest and possibly the rarest of the buttonquail. This species is endemic to Cape York Peninsula, in Queensland, Australia.

== Description ==
The buff-breasted buttonquail measures from 18–23 cm (7.1–9.1 in) and usually weighs over 110 g (3.9 oz). Both the tail and wings are short. The back is chestnut. The sides of the head are marked with chestnut on an otherwise plain gray head; while the breast is warm buff-colored. The painted buttonquail and the brown quail both coexist with this species. The buff-breasted is larger (and longer-legged) than either and is quite different from the all-dark quail. The painted species is almost totally mottled, with bold white spotting on the breast and no warm buff coloration. The most similar species to the buff-breasted is the chestnut-backed buttonquail, which does not overlap in the wild.

The advertising (or booming) call made by the female is ooom-oom-oom, repeated up to 20 times. The notes are almost inaudible initially, then become gradually louder, higher-pitched and shorter until they are far-carrying. The males will respond with a deep, rapid chu-chu-chu whistle. Other calls, perhaps in reaction to danger, include gug-gug-gug, a soft chirp-chirp-chirp and a loud kwaare-kwaare.

== Distribution and habitat ==
These birds favor lowland, subcoastal grasslands or woodlands. They may be found at any elevation to 400 m (1,300 ft). Reports describe this species as dependent on grassy woods made up of Melaleuca, Acacia, Alphitonia and Tristania. They have been seen in area of heavy scrub ground cover, up to 1 m (3.3 ft) high in some cases, but can also be seen in rocky areas where almost no scrub cover is present.

=== Important Bird Areas ===
Sites identified by BirdLife International as being important for buff-breasted buttonquail conservation are the Iron and McIlwraith Ranges, and the Morehead River of Far North Queensland.

== Conservation status ==
The buff-breasted buttonquail is an endangered species, with a population estimated at 500 individuals and an historical range of 2,070 km^{2} (800 sq mi). They have been extirpated from large portions of their original range, probably due in part due to cattle overgrazing, sites made unsuitable by fire regimes and general habitat clearances to make way for human habitation.

A series of targeted surveys for this species from 2018 to 2022 failed to find any individuals despite locating four other species of buttonquail within the region, suggesting that some reports of buff-breasted buttonquail since the 1920s may be misidentifications of related taxa.

T. olivii has been listed as Critically Endangered by the IUCN Red List and the Australian EPBC Act.

== Behaviour ==
Very few people see the buff-breasted buttonquail due to its tiny range and inconspicuous disposition. The buttonquail usually walk or run in areas where they are well camouflaged, almost never leaving the ground except when absolutely necessary. They are usually sedentary, but local movements have been recorded, probably in response to seasonal habitat changes.

=== Diet ===
Details of their diet are little known, but (like most buttonquail) they probably eat insects and seeds, with sand used as a digestion aid.

=== Breeding ===
These birds are known to be solitary breeders. The breeding season is January through March. The nest is a shallow depression with a dome of grasses and a side entrance, which itself is lined with grasses and leaves. Usually the nest site is well obscured behind grasses, low scrubs or tussock. Two to four round eggs (usually 3) are laid. The eggs are whitish and speckled with chestnut, bluish-gray or black. The incubation period is unknown, but the male is thought to assume all incubation and chick-care activities. The young are precocial and nidifugous.
