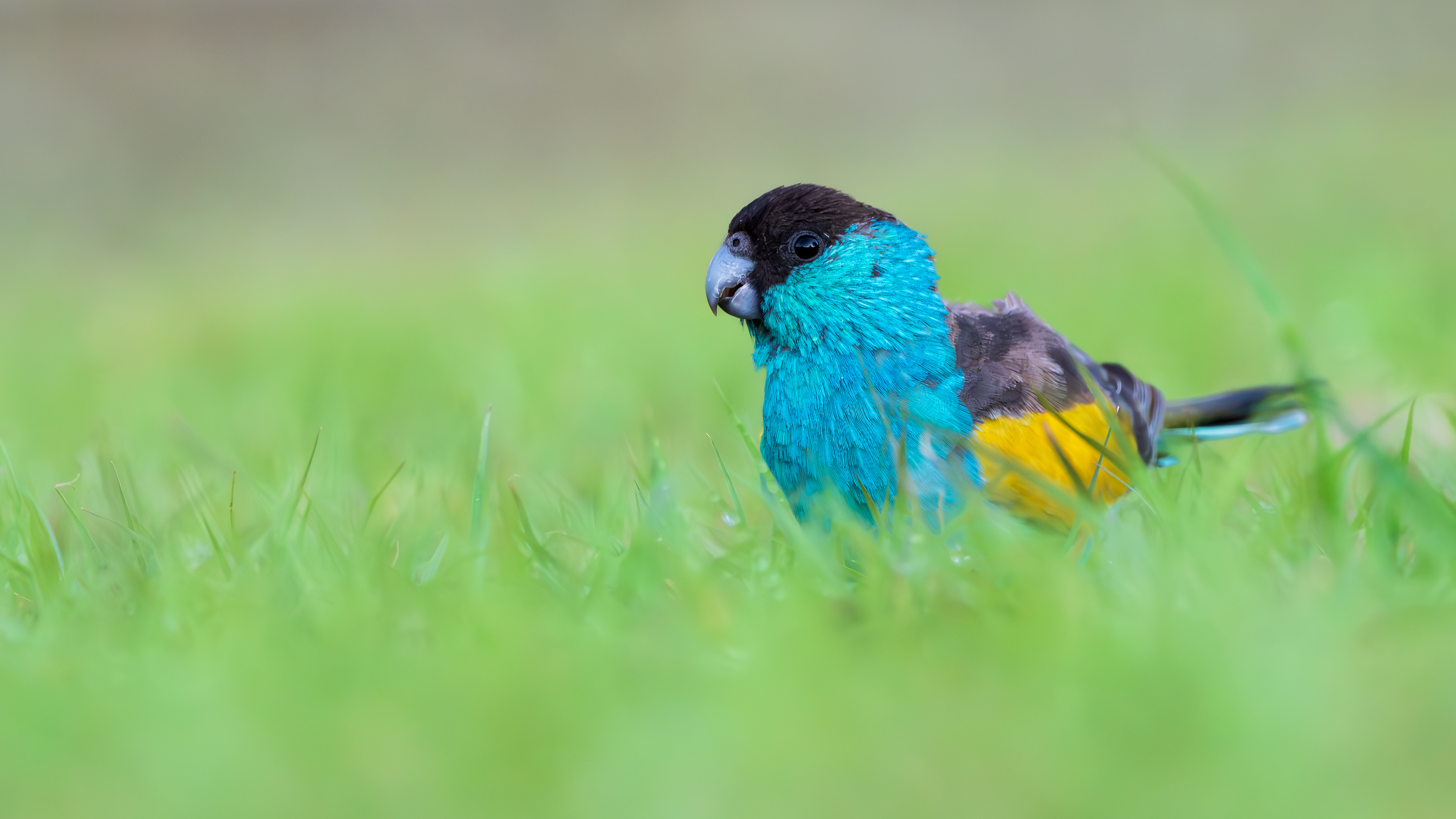
- Male, Pine Creek, Northern Territory
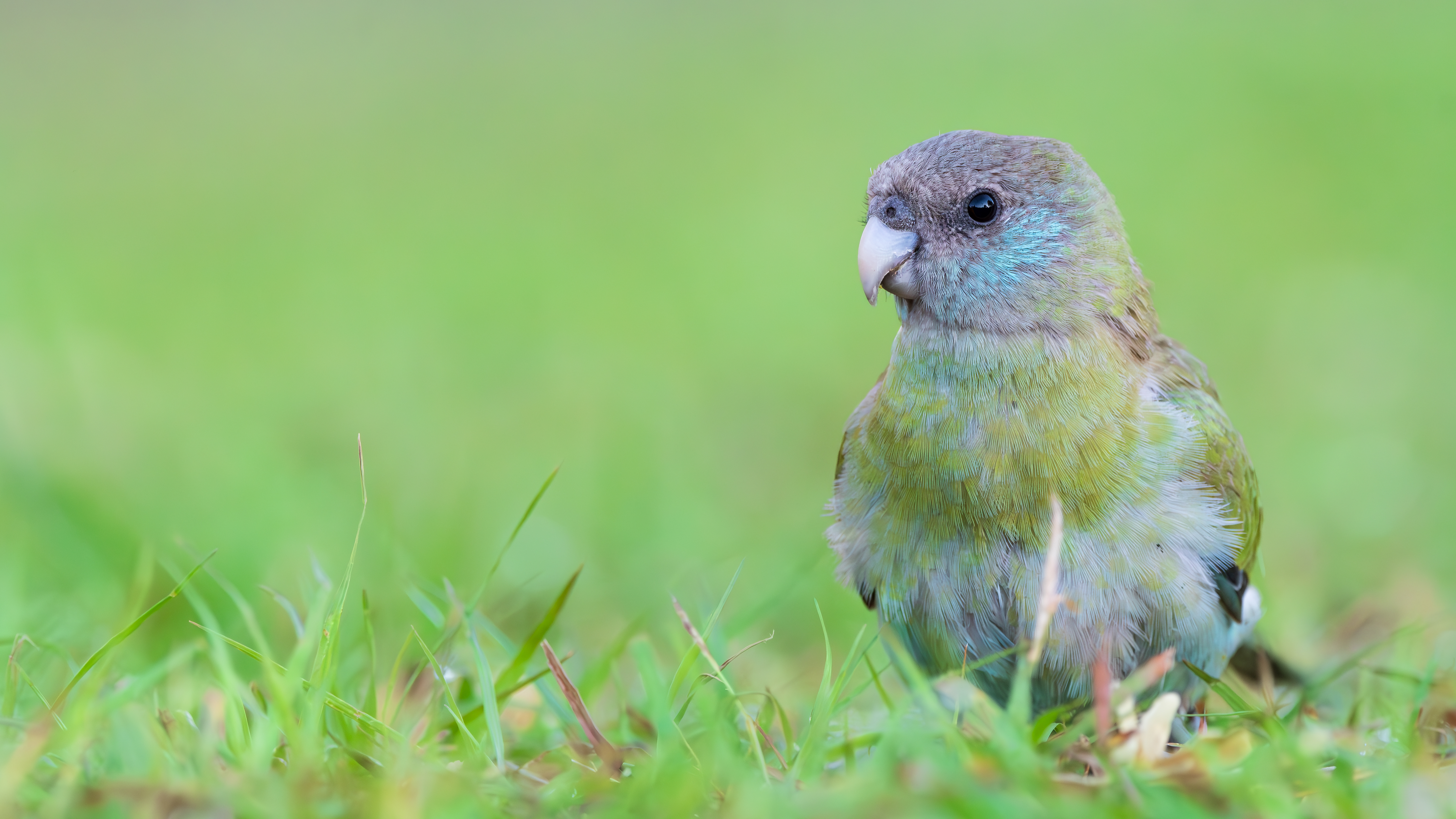
- Female, Pine Creek, Northern Territory

Conservation status
- Least Concern (IUCN 3.1)
- CITES Appendix I

Scientific classification
- Kingdom: Animalia
- Phylum: Chordata
- Class: Aves
- Order: Psittaciformes
- Family: Psittaculidae
- Genus: Psephotellus
- Species: P. dissimilis

Binomial name
- Psephotellus dissimilis (Collett, 1898)

Synonyms
- Psephotus dissimilis

= Hooded parrot =

Species of bird

The hooded parrot (Psephotellus dissimilis) is a species of parrot native to the Northern Territory in Australia. It is found in savannah and open woodland and is one of two extant species in its genus that breed in termite mounds. It has declined from much of its original range.

== Taxonomy ==
One of three species known as antbed parrots, the hooded parrot is closely related to (and sometimes considered a subspecies of) the golden-shouldered parrot (Psephotellus chrysopterygius). A genetic study revealed its ancestors most likely diverged from ancestors of the latter species in the late Miocene or early Pliocene at the conclusion of the 'Hill Gap'.

Norwegian naturalist Robert Collett described the hooded parrot in 1898. Its species name is the Latin word dissimilis "different" and either refers to its sexual dimorphism or its different appearance from its closest relative. Black-hooded parrot is an alternative name.

== Description ==
The hooded parrot is a medium-sized parrot, up to 26 cm (10 in) long, weighing 50 to 60 g (1.8 to 2.1 oz). The male has a black head, bluish-grey beak, dark-brown irises, and its wings have a yellow patch. Its upper-parts are brown, its lower parts are turquoise blue, its back is brown, the tail is olive green tipped pale blue, and its legs are pink-grey. The female is a dull-green parrot with a grey-brown head and pink undertail coverts. Juveniles are similar to the female.

The male hooded parrot can be distinguished from the similar looking male golden-shouldered parrot mainly by the absence of a pale frontal band, a larger yellow patch on the wings, and absence of the red on the abdomen. The female is very similar to the female Yellow-shouldered parrot being identified by the absence of a pale frontal band and an absence of red on the abdomen.

== Distribution and habitat ==
An Australian endemic, the hooded parrot inhabits to semi-arid areas of northeast Northern Territory, and is separated from the golden-shouldered parrot by the Carpentarian faunal barrier.

Though this species has disappeared from most of its original range, it remains common in protected areas. The hooded parrot is evaluated as Least Concern on IUCN Red List of Threatened Species.

== Behaviour ==
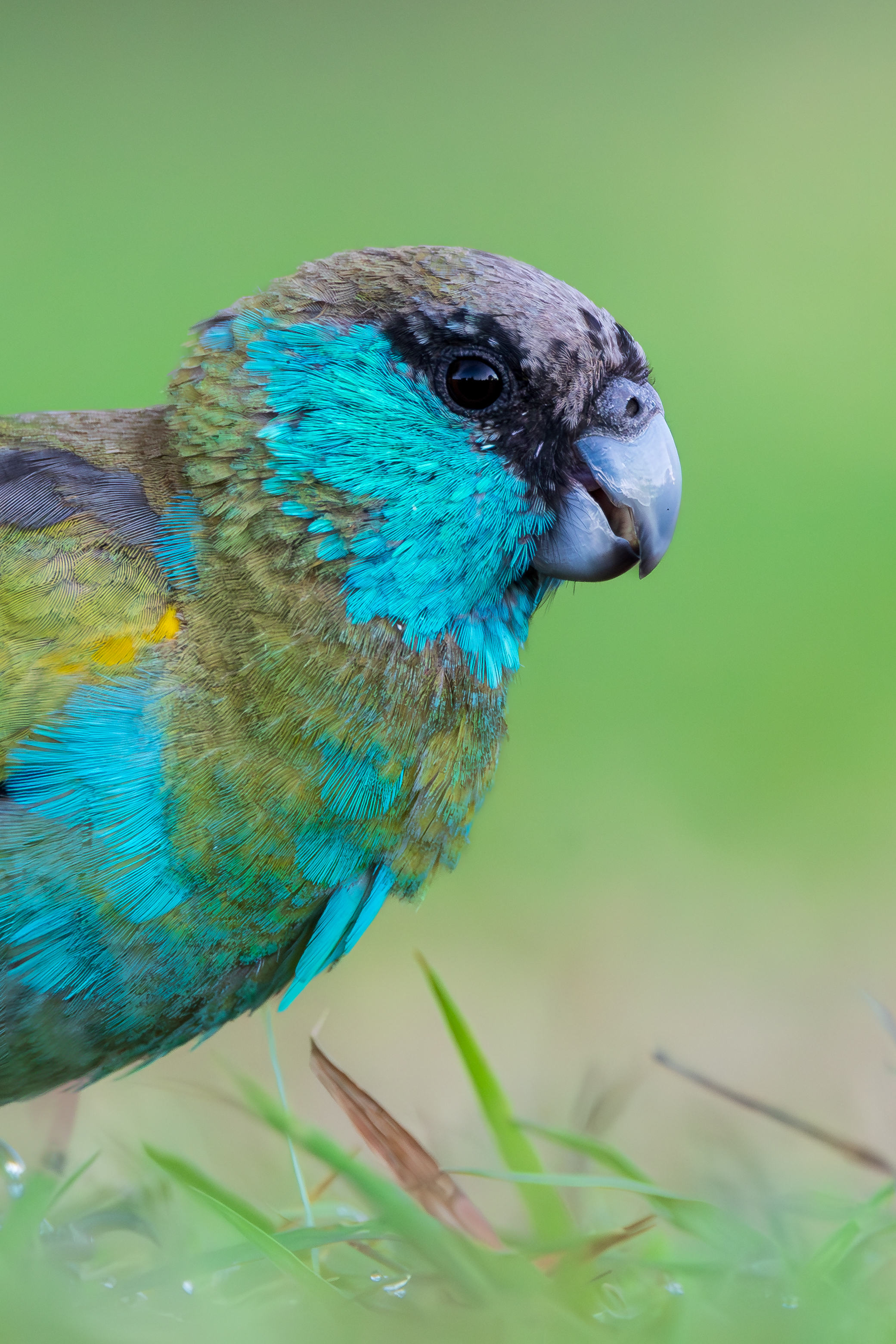
A hooded parrot male in moulting plumage

The diet consists mainly of seeds, berries and vegetables.

The hooded parrot digs cavities in termite mounds. It generally chooses conical termite mounds, only successful in flat two dimensional mounds if it digs at the edge rather than on the face of the mound. Excavation takes around three weeks. The tunnel is roughly horizontal and around 50 to 80 cm (20 to 31 in) long.

Breeding takes place once or twice a year between April and August. The female lays four or five white, slightly shiny eggs that are 21 mm (0.83 in) long by 19 mm (0.75 in) wide.

The hooded parrot has a close ecological relationship with the moth species Trisyntopa neossophila. The female moth lays eggs in the parrot nesting cavity, so that the eggs hatch at the same time as the baby hooded parrots. The moth larvae live in small tunnels at the base of the cavity and emerge to eat the dark material of parrot feces, leaving the white uric acid deposits. They build a silk layer across the base of the cavity to protect themselves from chicks. They pupate in the cavity walls once the juvenile parrots leave the nest.

The goanna species Varanus tristis has been recorded raiding nests for eggs.

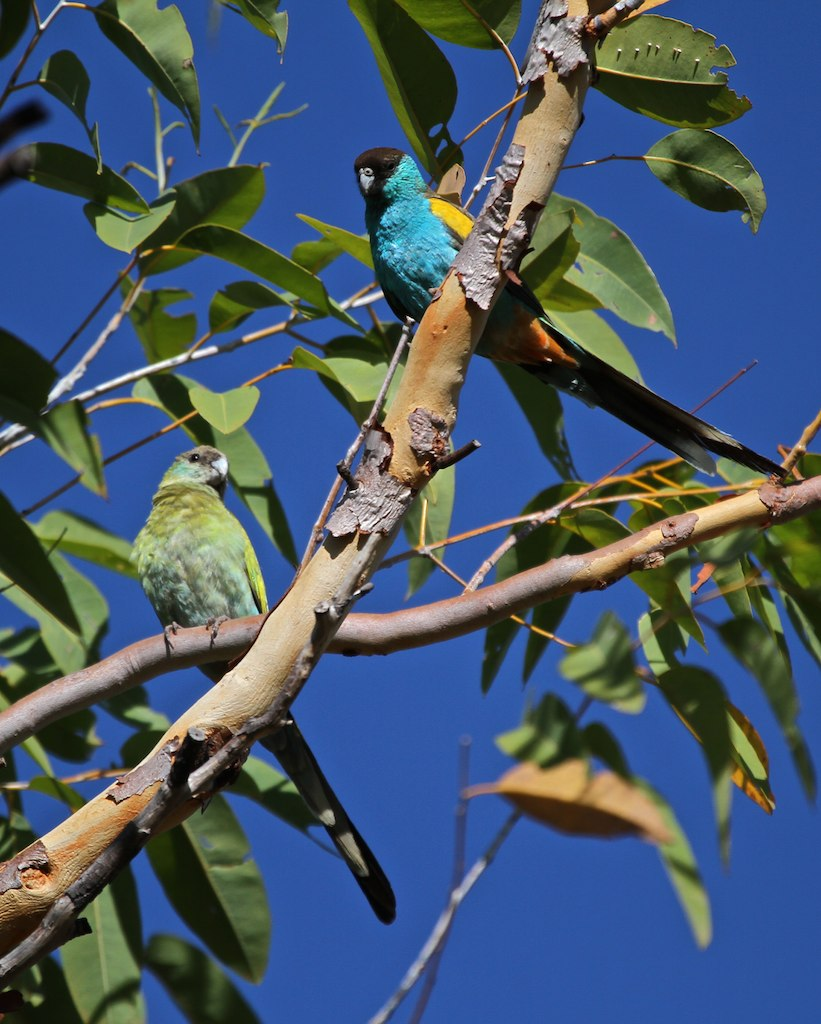
A pair in the Northern Territory, Australia

The termite mounds are vulnerable to damage by cattle in cattle-breeding areas, which threatens nesting sites. A flock of 28 immature birds perished after drinking water contaminated with tar at a tar spill by the side of the road.

== Aviculture ==
The hooded parrot breeds readily in captivity but it can be aggressive, which precludes keeping it in a mixed aviary with other parrot species. It became much more popular in captivity in Australia in the 1980s. A yellow mutation has been bred.

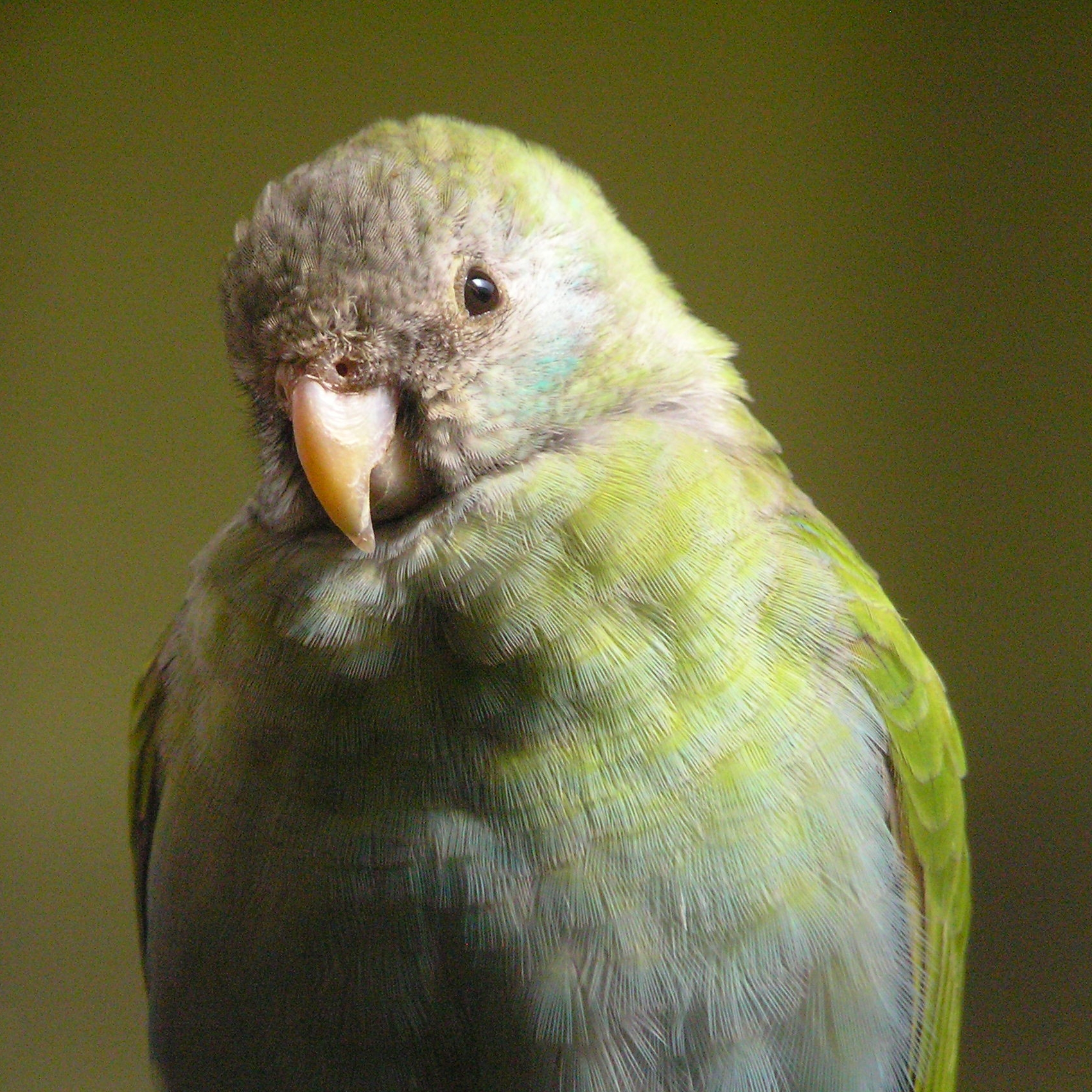
Female at Burgers' Zoo, Arnhem, Netherlands
