= Morehead River Important Bird Area =

Area in Queensland, Australia

Coordinates: 15°11′55″S 143°25′14″E

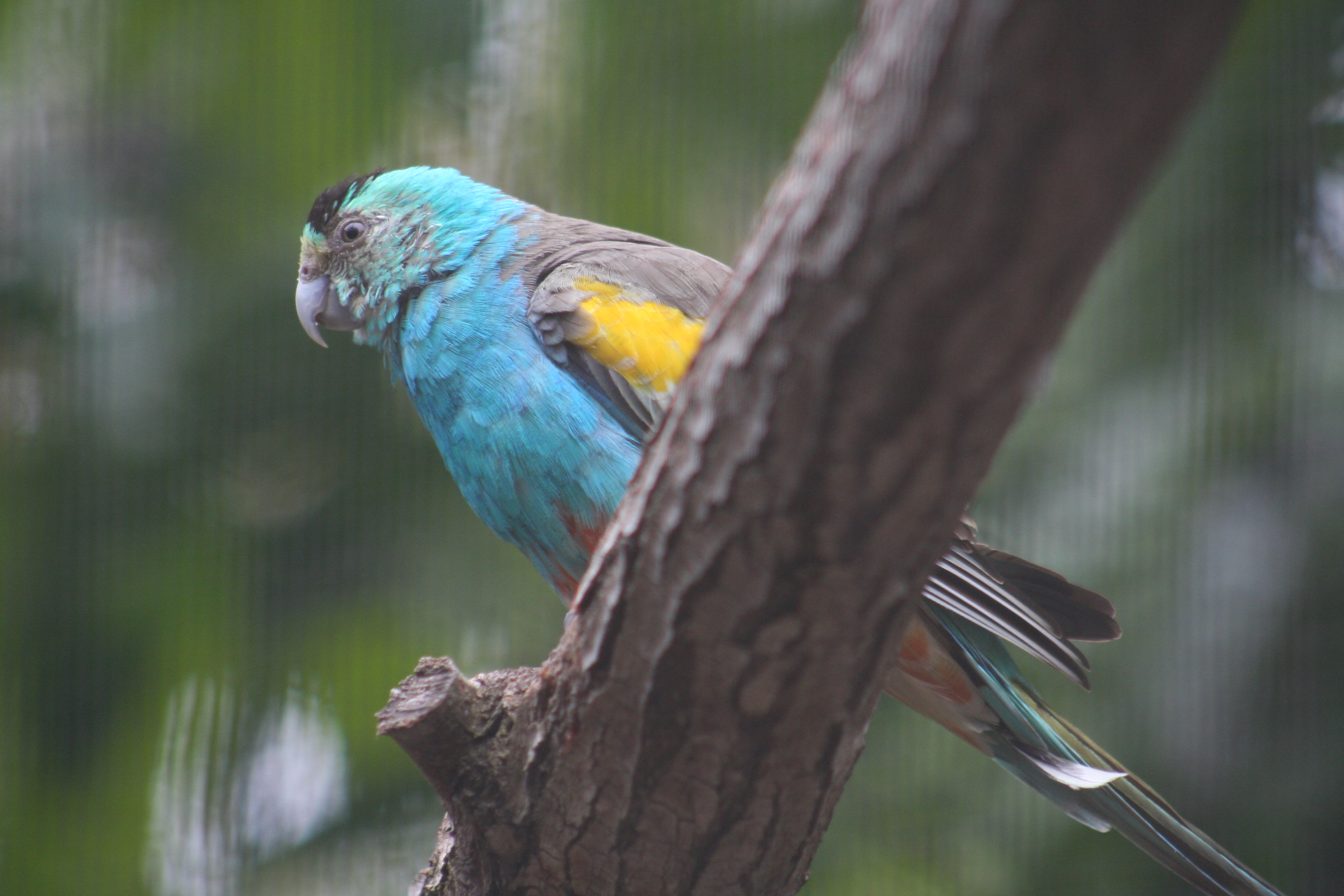
The IBA is an important area for golden-shouldered parrots

The Morehead River Important Bird Area comprises a 1356 km^{2} tract of tropical savanna woodland in the south-eastern Cape York Peninsula of Far North Queensland, Australia.

== Description ==
The land is mainly pastoral lease used for extensive cattle grazing. It consists of low hills drained by ephemeral creeks and covered with open savanna woodland containing Melaleucas. It also has narrow strips of riparian rainforest adjoining grasslands. It has a monsoonal tropical savanna climate.

== Birds ==
The site has been identified by BirdLife International as an Important Bird Area (IBA) because it supports a large proportion of the population of the endangered golden-shouldered parrot, and possibly of the buff-breasted button-quail. It also contains significant populations of black-throated and masked finches, bush stone-curlews, silver-crowned friarbirds, and yellow-tinted, yellow, banded, white-gaped and bar-breasted honeyeaters. During the wet season azure kingfishers occur along the streams with rainforest birds such as fairy gerygones and pied imperial-pigeons. The wet grasslands are used by Latham's snipes on migration and by brolgas for nesting. Black-breasted buzzards sometimes nest in the IBA and red goshawks have been recorded there.
