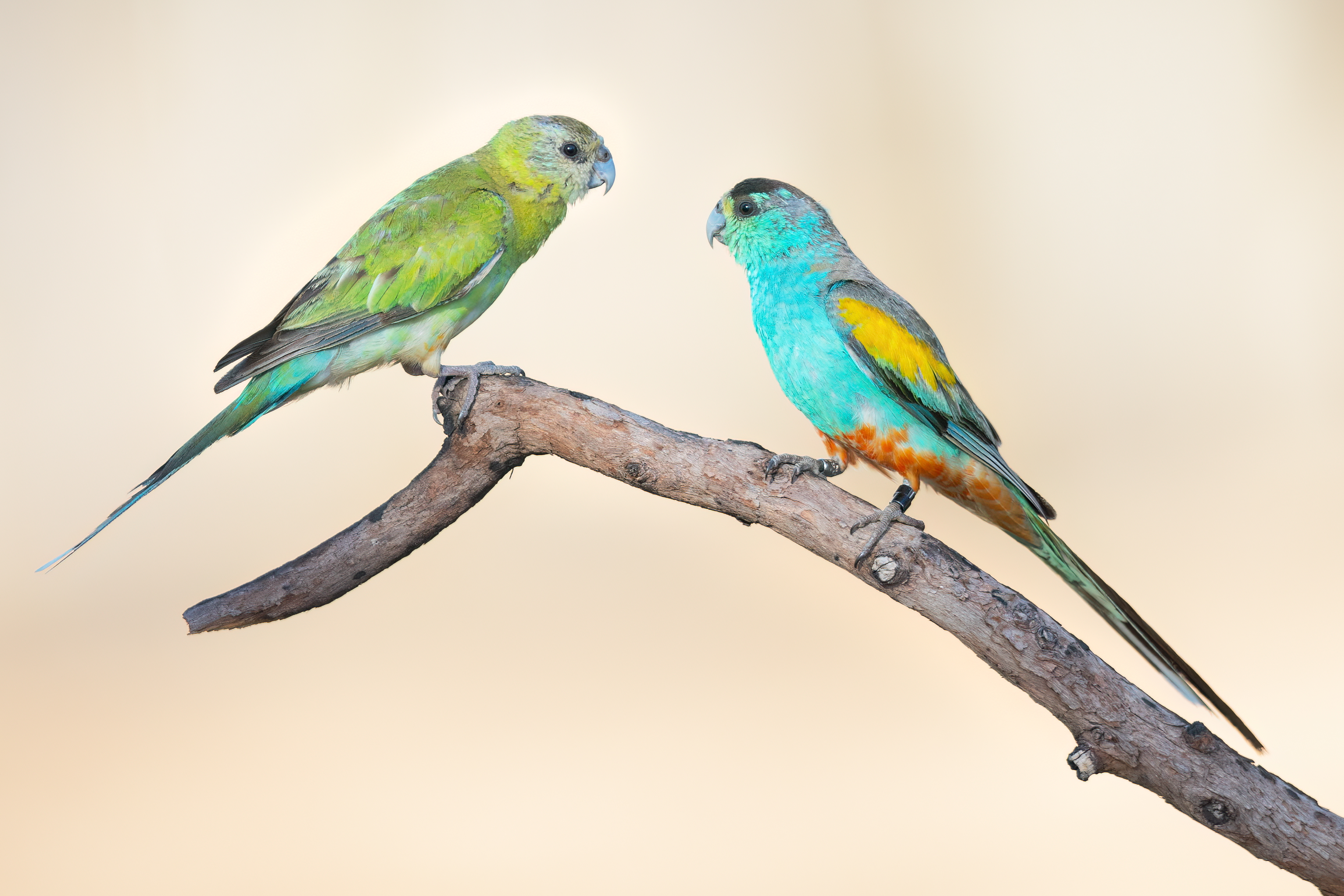
- Female on the left, male on the right

Conservation status
- Endangered (IUCN 3.1)
- CITES Appendix I

Scientific classification
- Kingdom: Animalia
- Phylum: Chordata
- Class: Aves
- Order: Psittaciformes
- Family: Psittaculidae
- Genus: Psephotellus
- Species: P. chrysopterygius

Binomial name
- Psephotellus chrysopterygius (Gould, 1858)

Synonyms
- Psephotus chrysopterygius

= Golden-shouldered parrot =

Species of bird

The golden-shouldered parrot (Psephotellus chrysopterygius), also known as the alwal, arrmorral, minpin, thaku, or antbed parrot, is a rare bird of the southern Cape York Peninsula, in Queensland, Australia. A small parrot related to the more common hooded parrot (P. dissimilis) of the Northern Territory and the extinct paradise parrot of Queensland and New South Wales.

It is classified as endangered due mostly to an increase in mid-story vegetation, which increases predation. A major conservation project is underway on Artemis Station to save the species from extinction. This was also the location for filming the BBC's Planet Earth III.

== Taxonomy ==
The golden-shouldered parrot was formally described in 1858 by the English ornithologist John Gould from specimens collected by Joseph Elsey in northern Queensland while on an expedition led by Augustus Gregory. Gould placed the species in the genus Psephotus and coined the binomial name Psephotus chrysopterygius. The golden-shouldered parrot is now one of four species placed in the genus Psephotellus that was introduced in 1913 by the ornithologist Gregory Mathews. The species is monotypic: no subspecies are recognised. The genus name is a diminutive of Psephotus which is from the Ancient Greek psēphōtos meaning "inlaid with mosaic stones or jewels". The specific epithet chrysopterygius combines the Greek khrusos meaning "gold" with pterux, pterugos meaning "wing".

This parrot is most closely related to the extinct paradise parrot (Psephotellus pulcherrimus) and the two together are sister to the hooded parrot Psephotellus dissimilis.

== Description ==
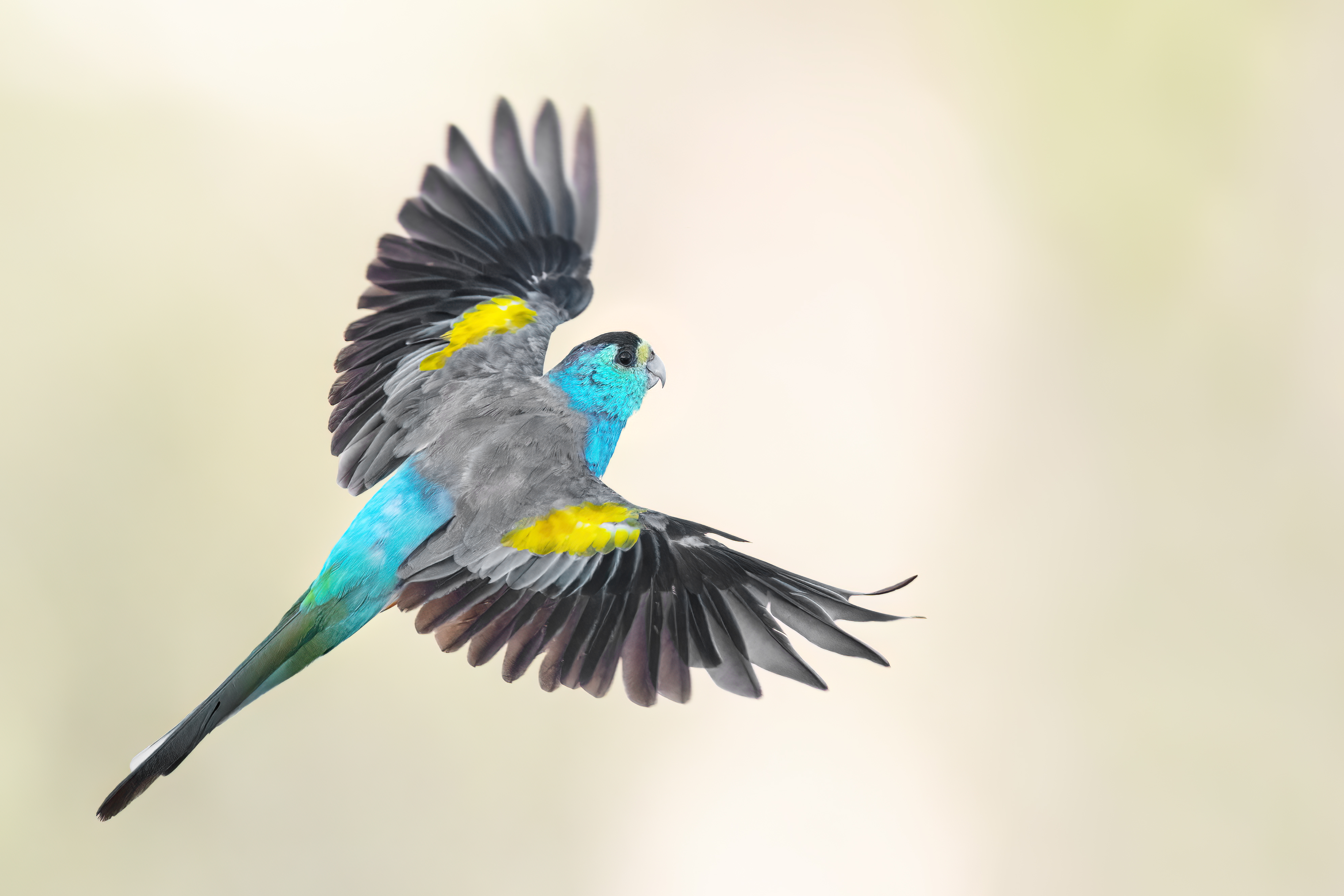
Male in flight

The golden-shouldered parrot is 25–27 cm (9.8–10.6 in) long and weighs 54–56 g (1.9–2.0 oz). The adult male is mainly blue and has a characteristic yellow over the shoulder area. It has a black cap and pale yellow frontal band. It has an extended dark salmon pink lower belly, thighs and undertail-coverts. It has a grey-brown lower back.

Adult females are mainly dull greenish-yellow, and have a broad cream bar on the underside of the wings. The head in older females has a charcoal grey cap. The feathers of the vent area are a pale salmon pink. Juveniles are similar to the adult female though newly fledged males have a brighter blue cheek patch than females of the same age.

== Habitat ==
The golden-shouldered parrot lives in open forested grassland liberally populated by numerous termite species and their mounds. Often these mounds are found every few metres apart. The parrot feeds on the seeds of small grass species and several months of the year, principally those prior to the onset of the wet season, the birds are almost entirely dependent on the small but plentiful seed of firegrass (Schizachyrium fragile). An important habitat requirement is the presence of suitably sized terrestrial termite mounds, in which the birds nest. This has led to the golden shouldered parrot and its relatives being known as the antbed parrots.

== Breeding ==
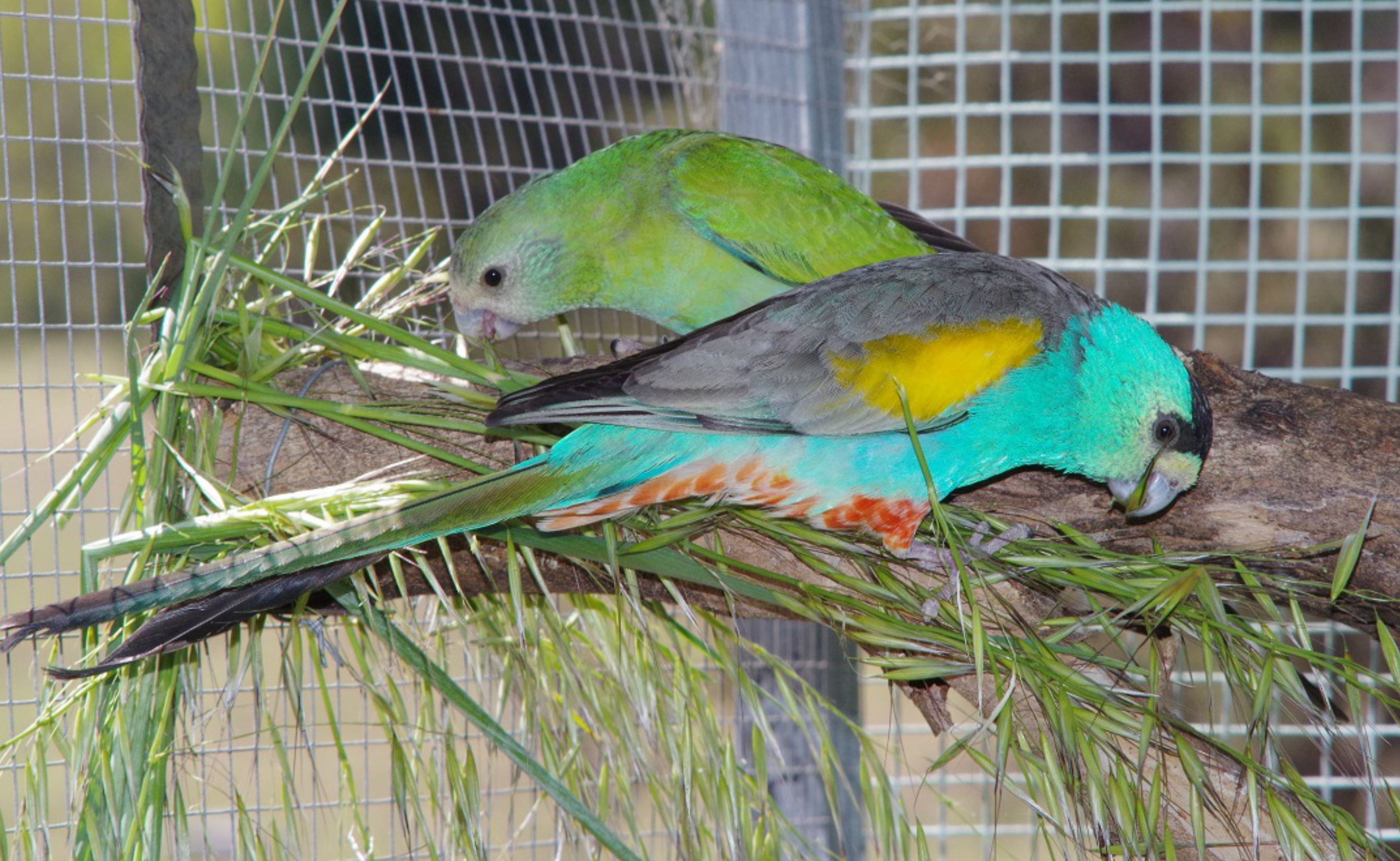
A pair in captivity in the Netherlands

The golden-shouldered parrot breeding season occurs from March to August. They construct nests in termite mounds, with a strong preference for conical shaped mounds. A 50–350 mm (2.0–13.8 in) long tunnel is excavated into the mound, ending in the nesting chamber. The clutch size is between 3–6 eggs, which are incubated by the female for 20 days. The termite occupants of the mound use a natural form of air conditioning to preserve the climatic conditions of their colony and this process regulates the temperature of the parrot's nest chamber at around 28–30 °C (82–86 °F). Temperature surveys have shown, however, a range of 13–35 °C (55–95 °F). These conditions have led to the parrots developing a habit of leaving the eggs at night beginning around the 10th day after hatching. A symbiotic relationship is present between the golden shouldered parrot and the moth species Trisyntopa scatophaga, the antbed parrot moth. Found in around half of parrot nests, the moths seek out the newly dug nest tunnels and deposit their eggs in the entrance. The hatching moth larvae consume the faeces of the nestling parrots therefore helping to keep the nest chamber clean. Whether the parrots receive any other benefits from the presence of moths is arguable as not all nests contain moth larvae.

There appears to be a tendency for more male parrots relative to females to be born. This may be to counter the increased predation that males appear to suffer in the wild.

== Status ==
The golden-shouldered parrot is listed as endangered (CITES I), with population surveys pointing to a total wild population of between 700–1,100 birds with around 300 breeding pairs. The remaining majority of birds are thought to be juvenile birds in their first year of life.

The species has a restricted range and suffers from a variety of threats, including changes to habitat structure, excessive predation and loss of feeding habitat. The main threat relates to changes to burning regimes and grazing pressure in the birds' grasslands and sparse open woodlands. Grazing pressure (by cattle and agile wallabies) and damage by feral pigs reduces important food plants, like cockatoo grass. The interaction between changed fire patterns and grazing pressure has also led to a phenomenon called "woody thickening", whereby native trees and shrubs outcompete the grasses. Over time, this process results in the loss of grasslands and spare open woodlands, as they become dominated by higher tree densities. The extra cover that is created by this process allow the parrot predators, such as the pied butcherbird (Cracticus nigrogularis), to hunt more successfully. A number of cases have been noted where parrots raise nestlings on their own without a partner, or juveniles taking over the role of adults (that presumably have been killed). In captivity it is noted that golden-shouldered parrots will readily accept a new partner and this may be related to this wild breeding behaviour. Sites identified by BirdLife International as being important for golden-shouldered parrot conservation are Morehead River and Staaten River.

Much of the current understanding about Golden-shouldered Parrots comes from Artemis Station. In 2019, the owners of Artemis—the Shephard family—started a collaboration with ecologist Steve Murphy, based at the University of Queensland. Together, Murphy and the Shephards started "Artemis Nature Fund" to enable practical conservation actions to take place on the property. The main actions revolve around resetting the landscape to a more open vegetation structure. Many places on Artemis have undergone severe woody thickening over the past few decades. The work on Artemis centres upon resetting the ecosystem back to a more open state, which should relieve predation pressure. Between July 2021 and December 2022, approximately 60 hectares of breeding habitat had been restored by clearing. Temporary removal of cattle and reinstating former burning practices are also being used to manage habitats. Research is showing that predators are less likely to use areas once they are restored to an open structure. On-going monitoring of the parrots using colour-banding is yet to demonstrate an increase in numbers, however, monitoring during the 2022 breeding season suggested that nests were more likely to be successful if they had received management attention, in the form of clearing. Supplementary feeding has been occurring on Artemis since the early 2000s. This is designed to help birds through periods of natural food shortage, which is exacerbated by grazing pressure. It also gives birds a safer place to feed and provides researchers to monitor the survival of colour-banded birds.

The Golden shouldered parrot is scarce in captivity. A population of perhaps 1,000 birds in Australia and perhaps 300 held in overseas aviaries means a limited gene pool is available. A dedicated group of breeders in Australia have attempted to promote the species and ensure that a viable breeding population is maintained in captivity. Many international breeders are also working toward this same goal.

The provision of heated nest boxes for breeding birds and the replication of a wild type diet is being used to try and formulate a successful regime leading to more predictable breeding results. Aviary birds can tend to become too fat if fed too rich a diet, resulting in infertility issues. The tendency to aggression between pairs means the keeping of one pair to an aviary and solid partitions between aviaries is essential to prevent injuries. The provision of earth floors in aviaries is considered best practice. Suspended flights do not allow for the parrots need to dig and feed on the ground as they do in the wild.
