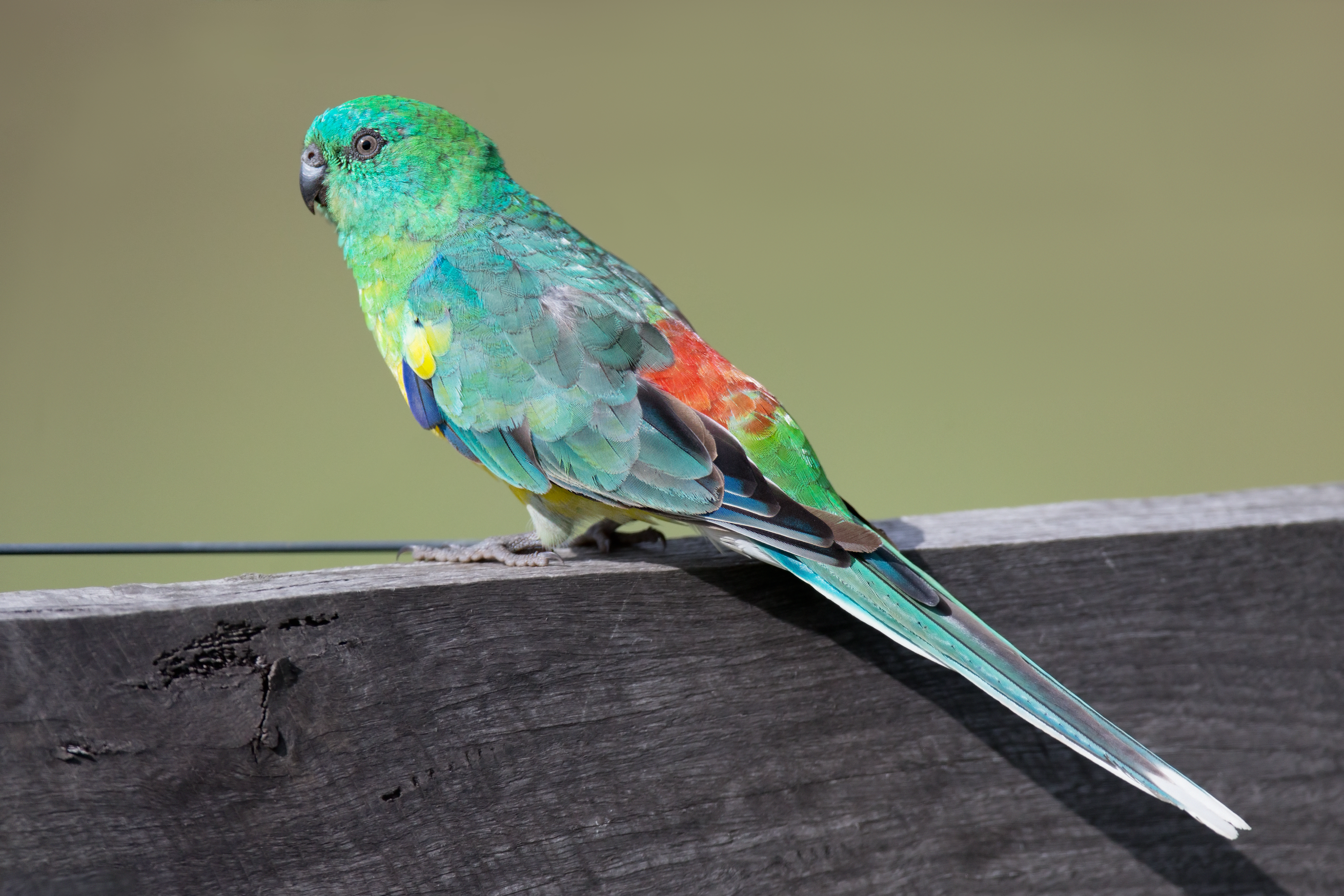
- Male in New South Wales, Australia
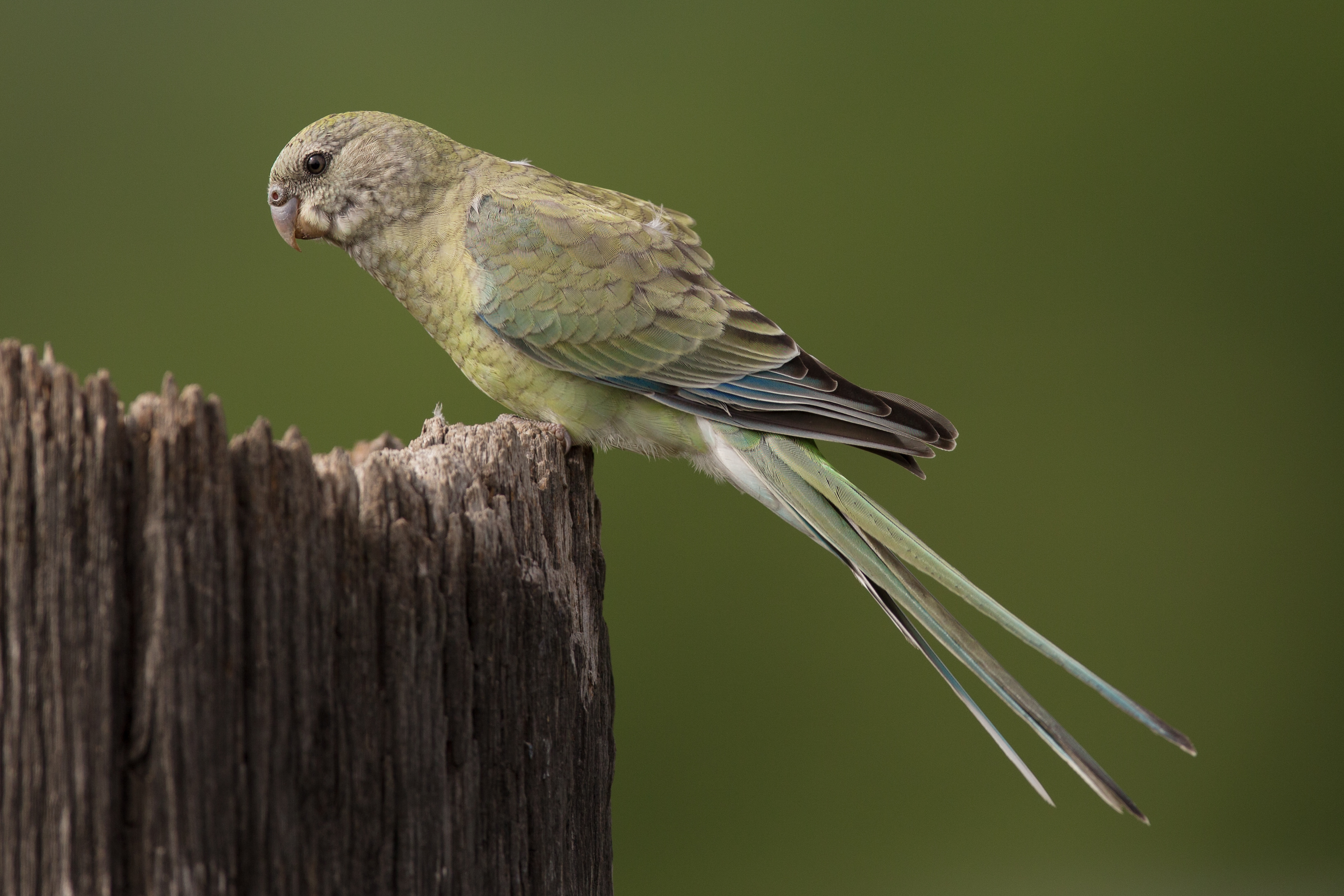
- Female in New South Wales, Australia

Conservation status
- Least Concern (IUCN 3.1)

Scientific classification
- Kingdom: Animalia
- Phylum: Chordata
- Class: Aves
- Order: Psittaciformes
- Family: Psittaculidae
- Tribe: Platycercini
- Genus: Psephotus; Gould, 1845
- Species: P. haematonotus

Binomial name
- Psephotus haematonotus (Gould, 1838)

Subspecies
- P. h. caeruleus (Condon, 1941); P. h. haematonotus (Gould, 1838)

= Red-rumped parrot =

Species of bird

The red-rumped parrot (Psephotus haematonotus), also known as the red-backed parrot or grass parrot, is a medium-sized broad-tailed parrot endemic to open woodland in south-eastern Australia, particularly in the Murray-Darling Basin. It is a highly sexually dimorphic species, with the adult female mainly being a greyish olive-green with lighter underparts and the adult male predominantly being a brightly coloured green and gold with various shades of blue on the wings. Only the adult male possesses the red rump that gives the species its common name.

It is commonly found in open, grassy habitats, both in natural open woodland and in man-made environments such as paddocks, fields, parks and gardens. It has adapted well to rural and suburban areas and is commonly observed foraging on the ground for a variety of seeds.

== Taxonomy and naming ==
The red-rumped parrot was described by John Gould in 1838 (Note: Although Gould presented the new species in 26 September 1837, the account was not published until 15 February 1838) as Platycercus haematonotus from a specimen collected in New South Wales. He felt it was intermediate between the genera Platycercus and the now obsolete genus Nanodes, placing it in the former. He gave it its species name on account of its red rump. Gould later reclassified it as Psephotus haematonotus in his book, Birds of Australia, Volume 5.

It is the type species for the genus Psephotus. It was long presumed to be closely related to the mulga parrot, however analysis of multiple genetic material shows it to be an early offshoot of a group containing the genera Platycercus and Barnardius. Hence all other species in the genus have been moved to the new genus Psephotellus, leaving the red-rumped parrot as the sole member in the now monotypic genus.

The species name derives from Ancient Greek psephotos, meaning "inlaid with pebbles". The specific epithet haematonotus stems from Greek haimato, meaning "blood" and noton meaning "back".

Two subspecies are recognised:

- P. h. haematonotus (Gould, 1838) - the nominate subspecies. Found in south-eastern Australia throughout much of New South Wales and Victoria.
- P. h. caeruleus (Condon, 1941) - found further inland in north-eastern South Australia and south-western Queensland.

The IOC World Bird List has designated red-rumped parrot as its official common name. It is also commonly known as the red-backed parrot or grass parrot.

== Description ==
Red-rumped parrots are slim, moderate-sized parrots measuring approximately 28 cm (11 in) in length and weighing between 45 and 77 grams.

The adult male's plumage is mainly a bright emerald-green with yellow underparts. The mantle, upper back and scapulars are a dull green-blue. The lower back and rump is brick-red. blue highlights on the wings and upper back and bright yellow patches on the shoulders. The irises are light brown.

The adult female's plumage is less vibrant, with pale olive underparts. The mantle, upper back and scapulars are a dull olive-green. The lower back and rump are lime-green. The irises are a light grey-brown. The characteristic red rump is only found in the male.

The plumage of juvenile males resemble females, except for their red rumps and light blue-green faces. Adults of both sexes have grey bills, being darker in the male, whereas immature birds have brown to yellow-brown bills. Both sexes have dark-grey flight feathers and dark blue underwing coverts, with blue outer wing tips visible in flight. An off-white white underwing bar is present on females of all ages and is retained in juvenile and immature males. The underwing bar is absent in males of approximately 2 years of age or older. A few months following fledging, juveniles will moult into adult-like plumage, retaining their flight and tail feathers. Moulting into the complete adult plumage begins when the birds are about 1 year old.

It is similar in appearance to the closely related mulga parrot (Psephotellus varius) which can be distinguished by its overall difference in colour, mainly the yellow band above its bill, red patch on the nape and smaller, darker red patch at the base of the tail which is present in both males and females.

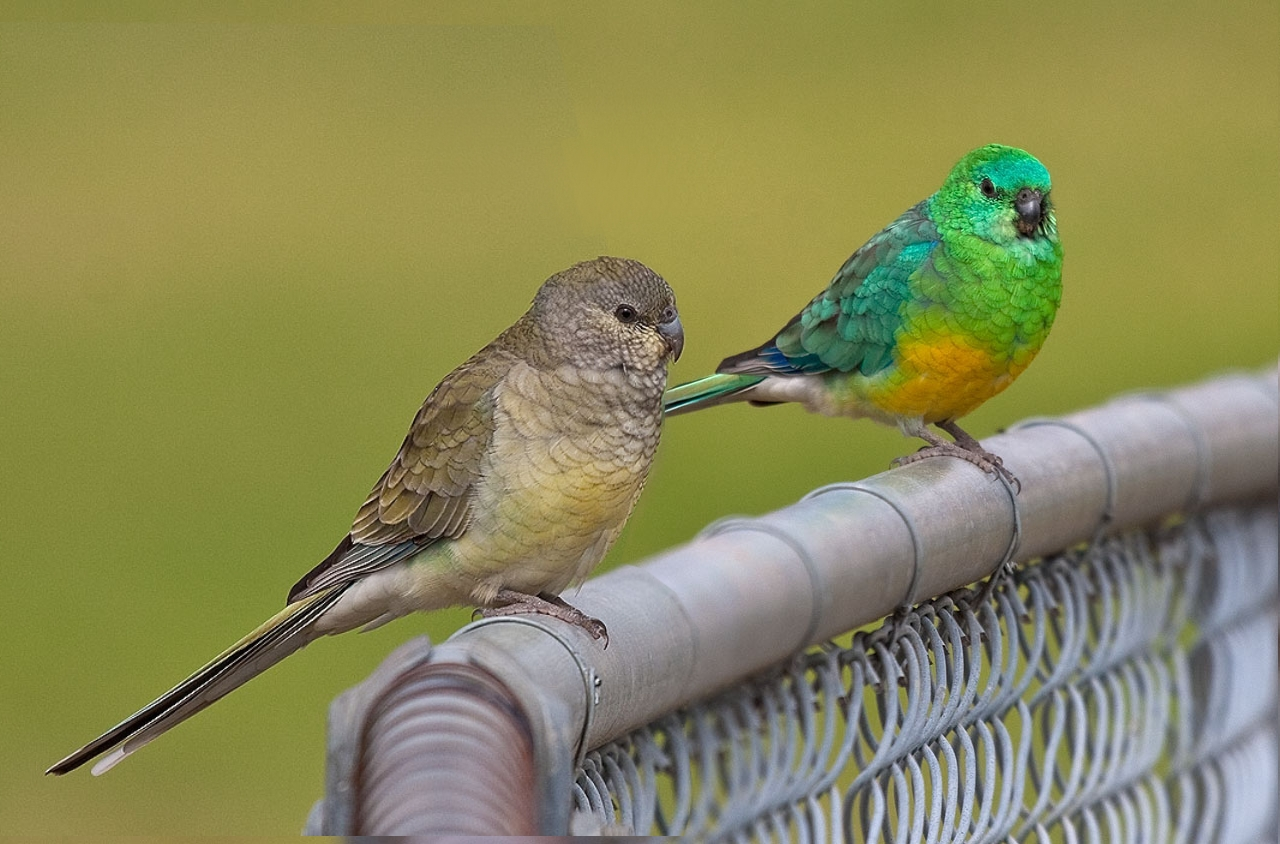
Female (left) and male (right) at Eastern Creek, New South Wales, Australia

== Distribution and habitat ==
Red-rumped parrots are widely distributed throughout lightly timbered plains, open woodland and other grassy habitats in south-eastern Australia below 1,000 metres (3,300 ft). Their range encompasses most of New South Wales and Victoria, as well as parts of southern Queensland and eastern South Australia. They avoid the coast and the wetter, more heavily wooded areas.

Subspecies caeruleus is only found far inland surrounding the Queensland-South Australia border.

They have adapted well to some urban and suburban areas and can be found in farmland, on roadside verges and in parks and gardens.

== Behaviour ==
Red-rumped parrots are non-migratory, with local movements after the breeding season. They can be found in pairs or flocks, occasionally reaching numbers of up to 100 or more birds. They are most crepuscular, active during dawn and dusk and avoiding activity during the hottest times of day. They spend a great deal of time feeding on the ground, and often call to one another with an attractive chee chillip chee chillip. Their green plumage provides such a good camouflage in ankle length grasses that they can hide quite effectively until the viewer is only 10–20 metres away.

=== Breeding ===
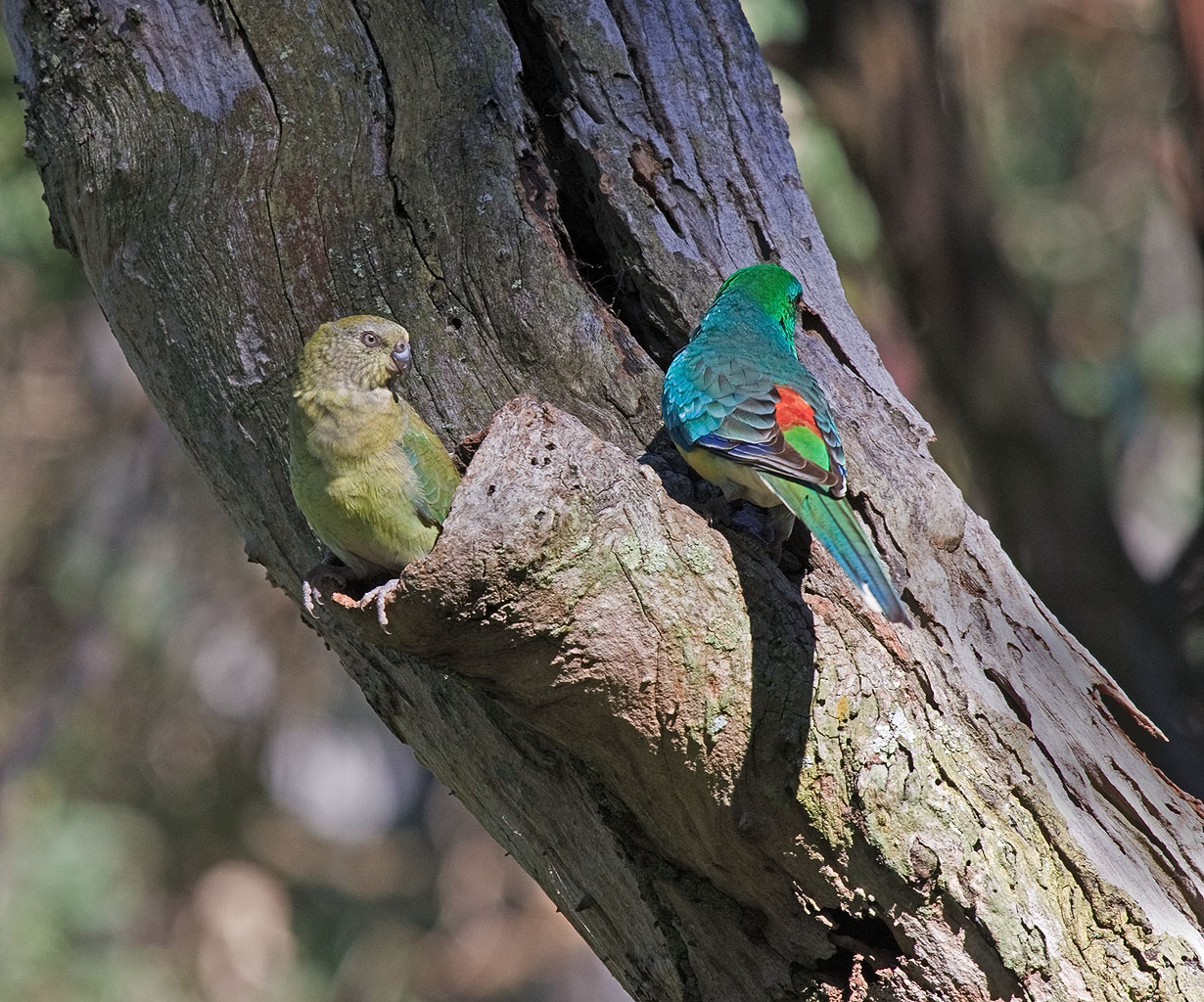
A pair at a nest hollow in suburban Sydney, Australia

Like many parrots, red-rumped parrots nest in tree hollows or similar places, including fenceposts and stumps. They lay 4-6 white eggs around 2 or so centimetres. Breeding usually takes place in spring (September–November); however, in the dryer inland areas, breeding can occur at any time of year in response to rainfall. They will begin to breed from between 12 and 18 months of age.

Red-rumped parrots are monogamous and pair for life. Both sexes defend the nest hollow. Incubation takes around 20–25 days and is done by the female alone. The father brings food to the mother while she incubates the eggs and feeds the chicks during their first few weeks of life, afterwards, feeding duties are undertaken by both parents. The fledging period begins when the chicks are 4–5 weeks of age.

Courtship involves a display where the male stretches out his body, fans out and wags his tail, bobs his head up and down and thrusts out his shoulders, exposing the bright yellow and blue wing patches. The display is followed by the male mutually feeding the female through regurgitation. Mutual preening may be observed in bonded pairs, although it is uncommon among broad-tailed parrots.

=== Feeding ===
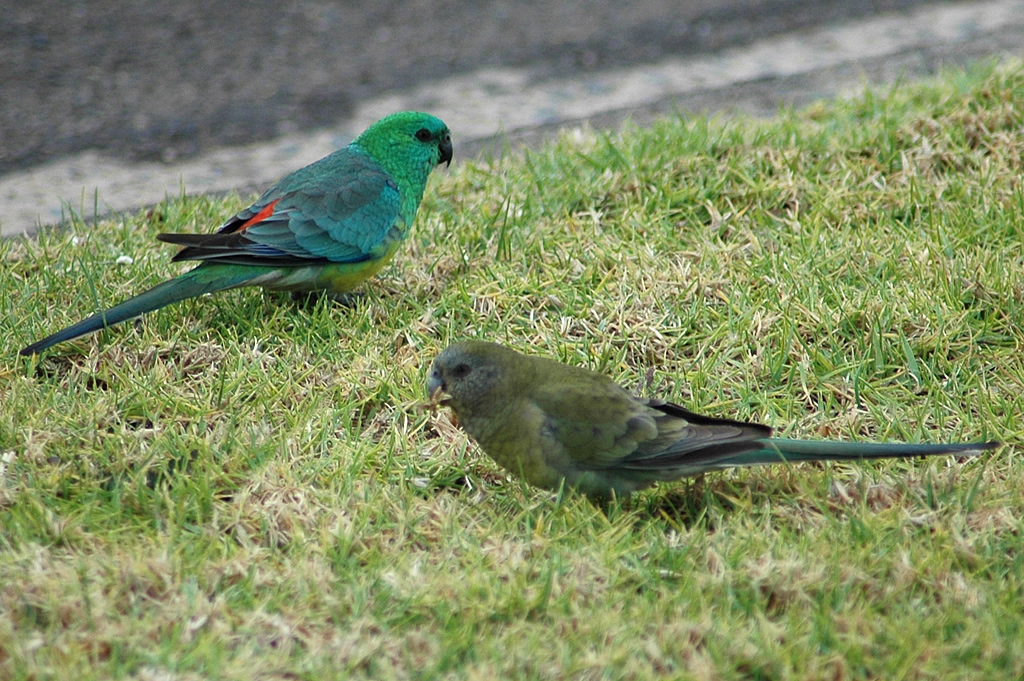
Male and female feeding on the ground

The red-rumped parrot's diet primarily consists of seeds and leaves of grasses and other herbaceous plants, both native and introduced. They may occasionally feed on small fruits, shoots and flowers. They predominantly feed on the ground in pairs or small flocks, and may be seen feeding with other seed-eating parrots such as galahs and eastern rosellas.

=== Threats ===
Currently, the red-rumped parrot is listed as Least Concern on the IUCN Red List of Threatened Species, and does not appear on the EPBC Act List of Threatened Fauna. Its population size has not been estimated, however it is believed to be increasing, and the species is reported to be common throughout its range.

Unlike many other Australian birds which are in decline due to land clearing and deforestation, the distribution and population of the red-rumped parrot are likely increasing as ongoing land clearing creates more suitable open habitat for the species.

Red-rumped parrots are often hit by cars and other vehicles when feeding on roadside verges, and are often killed by feral and outdoor cats. The introduced and invasive common myna (Acridotheres tristis) and European starling (Sturnus vulgaris) regularly outcompete red-rumped parrots and other native hollow-nesting species for nest sites. A study published in 1997 reveals that these two introduced birds are the dominant occupiers of available nest hollows and show strong evidence that they reduce the breeding success of native species. In this study, red-rumped parrots were often outcompeted by both introduced species, as well as the native eastern rosella and crimson rosella.

== Aviculture ==
Red-rumped parrots are becoming increasingly popular in aviculture due to their large range of attractive colour mutations and ease of care. They are incredibly hardy and can be kept in a variety of weather and climatic conditions. Compatible pairs breed readily in captivity if provided with necessary flight space and a large nesting box. They may raise up to four broods in a single season. Care must be taken to ensure parent birds do not display any signs of aggression towards their young once they have fledged.

=== Housing ===
Red-rumped parrots do well in aviaries and large cages. Only one male-female pair of red-rumps should be housed per enclosure, as these birds are known to be aggressive towards other birds, especially their own kind. Outdoor aviaries should provide ample shade and weatherproofing, as well as direct sunlight.

=== Mutations ===
Red-rumped parrots have been bred in a wide variety of colour mutations, with an estimated total of over 22 mutations available at present. These include cinnamon, lutino, pied, blue, albino and opaline.

=== Lifespan ===
In captivity, their average lifespan is 15 years, however, with proper feeding and care, these birds may live up to 32 years.
