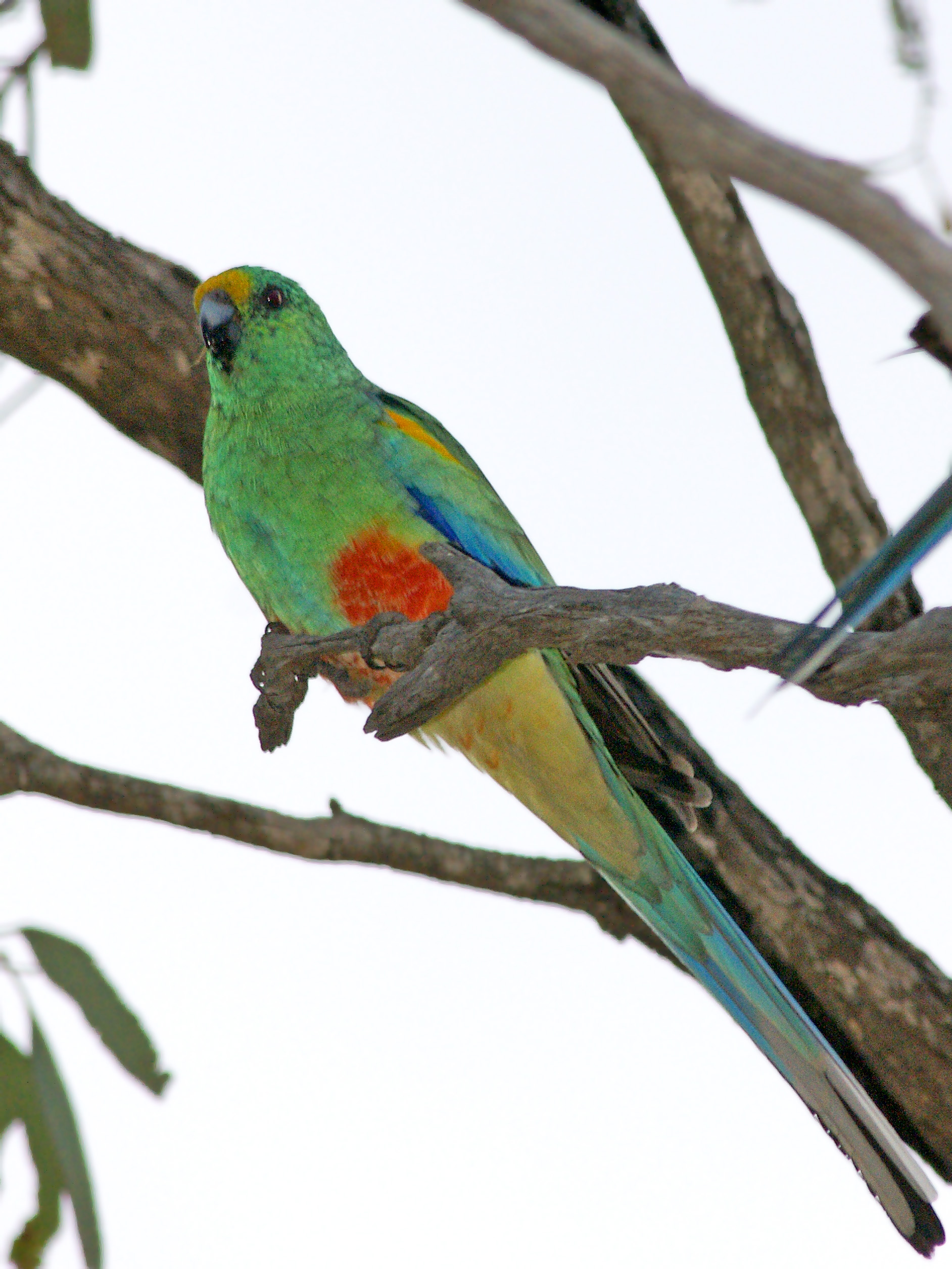
- Mulga parrot

Scientific classification
- Kingdom: Animalia
- Phylum: Chordata
- Class: Aves
- Order: Psittaciformes
- Family: Psittaculidae
- Tribe: Platycercini
- Genus: Psephotellus; Mathews, 1913

Type species
- Platycercus pulcherrimus Gould, 1845

Species
- Four; see text

= Psephotellus =

Genus of birds

Psephotellus is a genus of medium sized Australian parrots. Four species found across the country are recognised, one is presumed to have become extinct.

== Description ==
All species show considerable sexual dimorphism. These species have traditionally been placed in the genus Psephotus along with the red-rumped parrot, but a molecular study analysing nuclear and mitochondrial DNA found that the red-rumped parrot was an early offshoot in a clade of several genera of broad-tailed parrot, with the other species nested deeply within.

== Taxonomy ==
The genus was first proposed by Gregory Mathews in 1913, nominating the paradise parrot Platycercus pulcherrimus Gould as the type and forming a new combination as Psephotellus pulcherrimus.

== Diversity and distribution ==
Genus Psephotellus – Mathews, 1913 – four species
| Common name | Scientific name and subspecies | Range | Size and ecology | IUCN status and estimated population |
|---|---|---|---|---|
| mulga parrot | Psephotellus varius (Clark, AH, 1910) | Western New South Wales from Collarenabri, West Wyalong and Griffith westwards through the northwestern tip of Victoria and across South Australia to central Western Australia. | Size: Habitat: Diet: | LC |
| hooded parrot | Psephotellus dissimilis (Collett, 1898) | northeast Northern Territory | Size: Habitat: Diet: | LC |
| golden-shouldered parrot | Psephotellus chrysopterygius (Gould, 1858) | Queensland and New South Wales | Size: Habitat: Diet: | EN |
| paradise parrot | Psephotellus pulcherrimus (Gould, 1845) | formerly recorded in eastern Qld and northeastern NSW, no confirmed record since 1927. | Size: Habitat: Diet: | EX |
