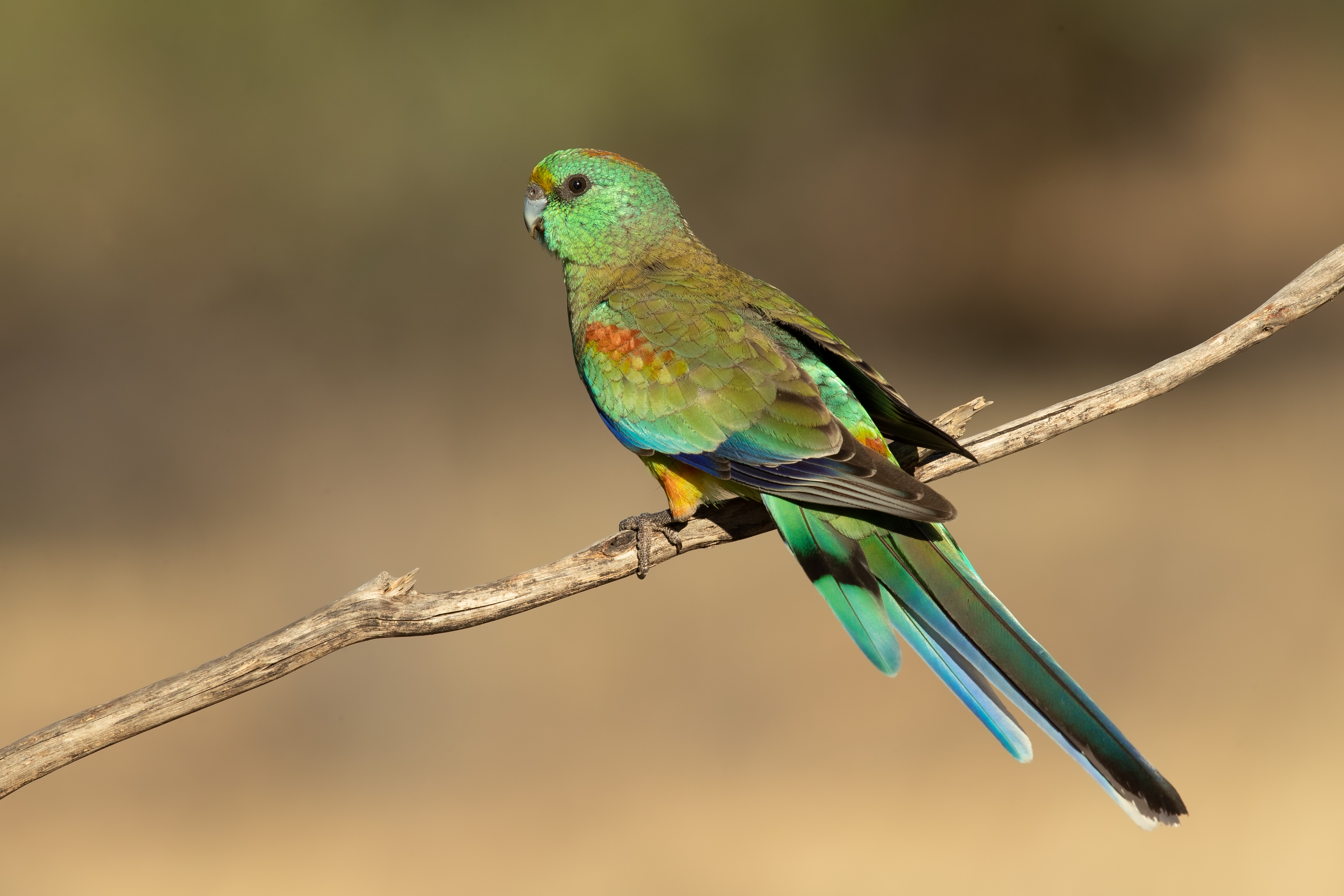
- male
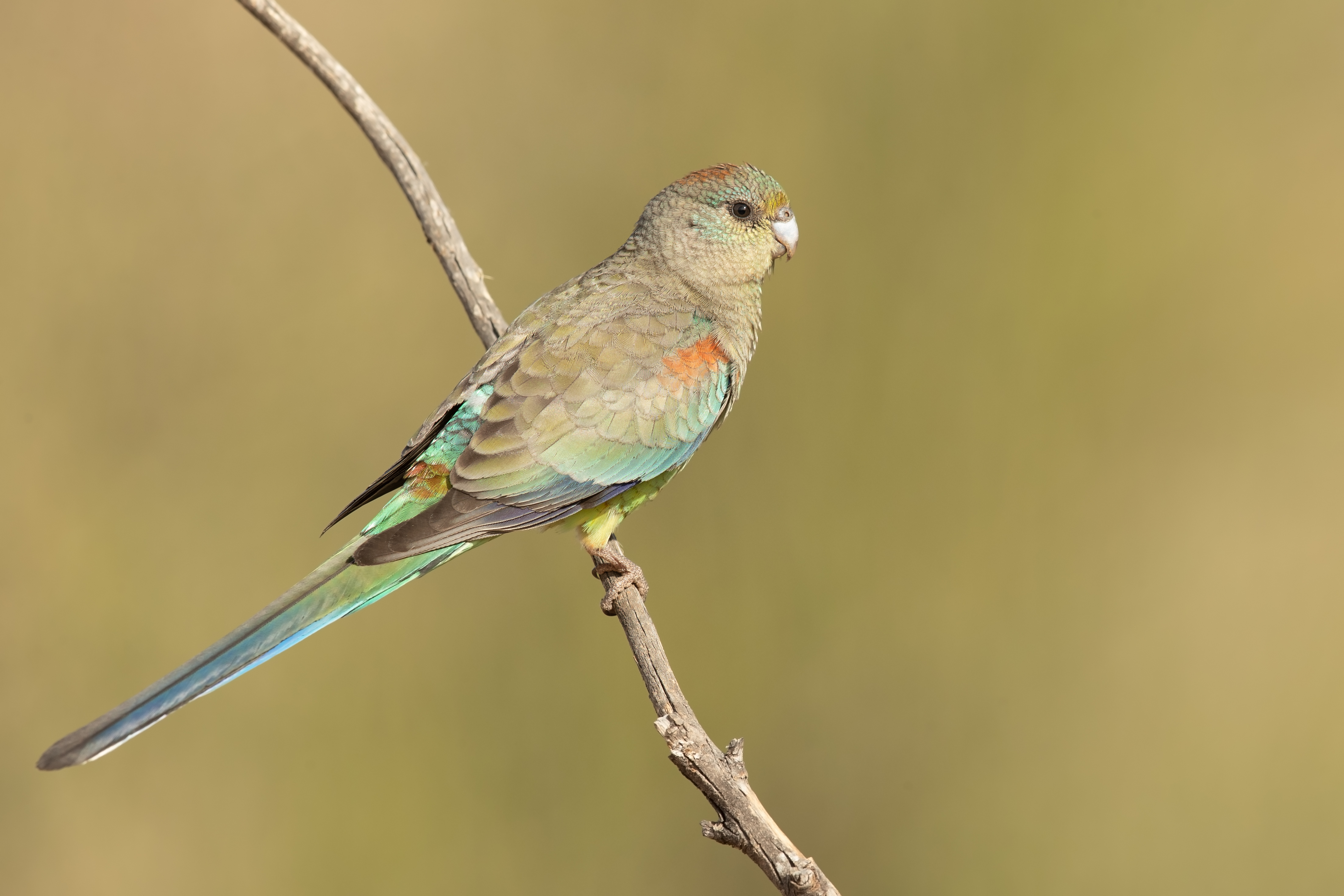
- female

Conservation status
- Least Concern (IUCN 3.1)

Scientific classification
- Kingdom: Animalia
- Phylum: Chordata
- Class: Aves
- Order: Psittaciformes
- Family: Psittaculidae
- Genus: Psephotellus
- Species: P. varius

Binomial name
- Psephotellus varius (Clark, AH, 1910)

Synonyms
- Psephotus multicolor Psephotus varius

= Mulga parrot =

Species of bird

The mulga parrot (Psephotellus varius) is endemic to arid scrublands and lightly timbered grasslands in the interior of southern Australia. The male mulga parrot is multicolored, from which the older common name of many-coloured parrot is derived.

== Taxonomy ==
The mulga parrot was given its current scientific name of Psephotellus varius by American zoologist Austin Hobart Clark in 1910, after its name Psephotus multicolor was ruled invalid as the original combination (Psittacus multicolor) had been used for another species. Gregory Mathews proposed the name Psephotus dulciei in 1911 for the same reason, unaware of Clark's proposal, which was published earlier and hence had priority.

Mathews described two additional subspecies of mulga parrot in 1912: P. varius rosinae, from a specimen collected from Yorke Peninsula, noting that it had less red on the abdomen and its upper breast was a darker green, and P. varius exsul from a specimen from Mount Magnet in Western Australia, reporting it had a more blue than green color overall, particularly on the cheeks. In 1917, he revised his classification, noting that he had assumed the type collection came from New South Wales but was now made aware that Brown's original specimen came from the Eyre Peninsula on the Spencer Gulf. He added P. varius ethelae from a collection from the Macdonnell Ranges, noting it had all over paler plumage, and renamed the New South Wales form P. varius orientalis, noting its brighter plumage and more prominent red color on the abdomen.

In 1941, Herbert Condon recognised subspecies varius and orientalis, but conceded evidence was lacking in confirming the other two.

In 1955, British evolutionary biologist Arthur Cain reviewed various described subspecies and found none were valid.

Cain concluded in 1955 that within the genus Psephotus the mulga parrot was more closely related to the golden-shouldered parrot than to the red-rumped parrot.

A 2011 genetic study including nuclear and mitochondrial DNA found that the mulga parrot was closely related to the red-capped parrot, the two lineages having diverged in the Miocene. The combined lineage itself diverging from one giving rise to the hooded and golden-shouldered parrots.

A 2018 genetic analysis of specimens across the mulga parrot's range found that there were two lineages that had diverged around 402,000 years ago and recently expanded. The Flinders Ranges and Eyre Peninsula appear to have been the barrier between the two lineages. Preliminary investigation into physical characteristics that might distinguish them suggested that the red patch on the abdomen was possibly brighter and more extensive in the eastern population. McElroy and colleagues agreed the two populations were distinct enough to be recognised as subspecies, however it is unclear to which group the type specimen belongs to.

John Gould called this bird "many-coloured parakeet" or "many-coloured parrot", a term used during the 19th century. The RAOU proposed "mulga parrot" in 1926. Other common names include various parrot and varied parrot.

A 2015 study of museum specimens found that the bill surface area of male mulga parrots had increased by 10.7% between 1871 and 2008. This is consistent with the hypothesis of Allen's rule, where appendages are larger in warmer climates to assist with heat loss.

== Description ==
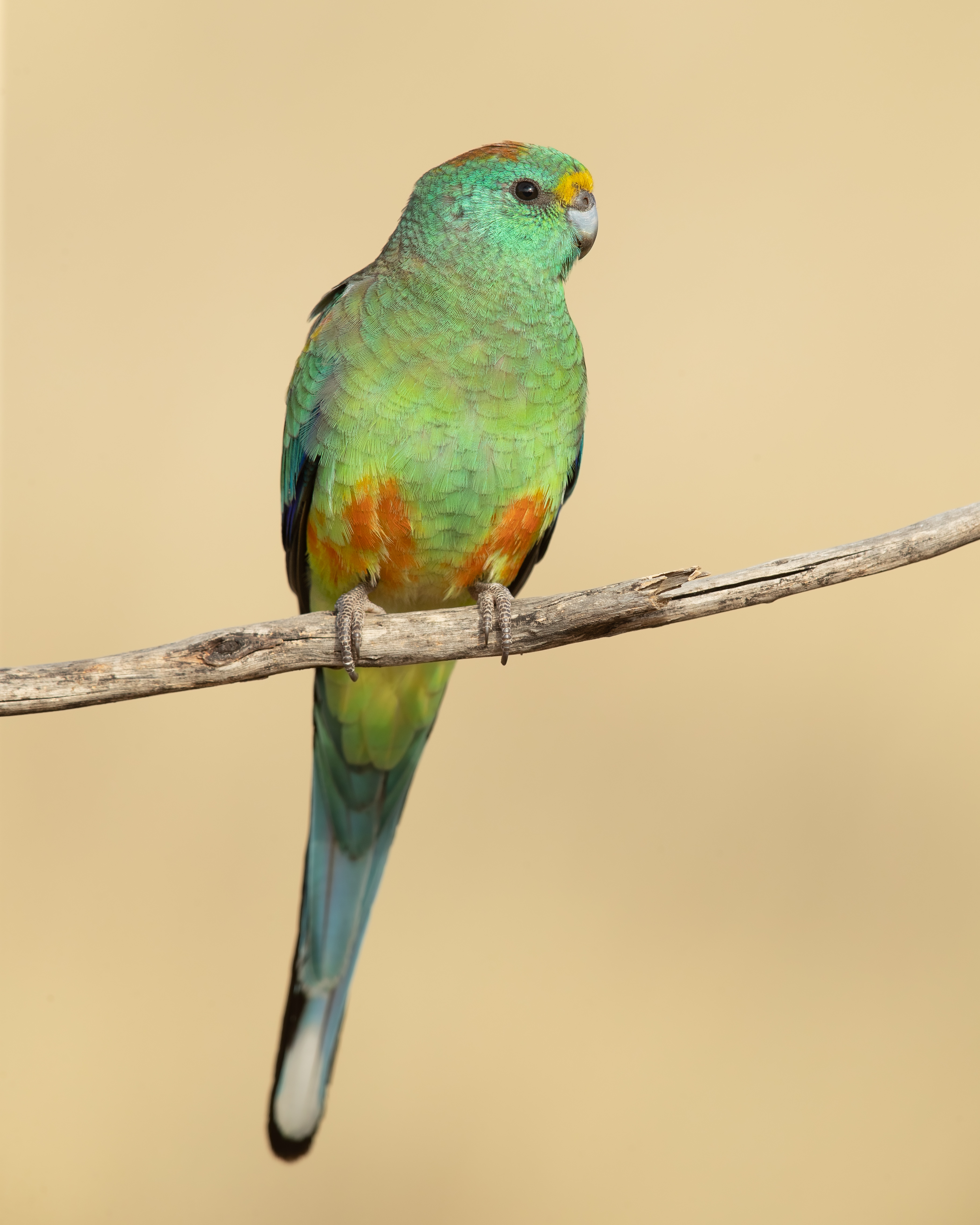
Male

The Mulga Parrot measures about 27–32 cm (10.5–12.5 in) in length with a 30–42 cm (12–16.5 in) wingspan, and it weighs 50–60 g (1.8–2.1 oz), the mulga parrot is a medium-sized parrot of slim build and long tail. The species is sexually dimorphic, the sexes differing markedly in plumage. The male mulga parrot is multicolored, from which the alternate common name many-coloured parrot is derived. It is a bright green overall, with a bluish tinge on the neck and above the eye, and paler on the breast. The rump is light green. The forehead is yellow and there is a red patch on the back of the head. The lower belly and thighs are yellowish marked with orange-red and the wings greenish apart from the yellow median wing coverts and blue outer webs of primaries. The long tail is an assortment of colours: the two long central feathers are dark blue tinged with green, the outer feathers are blue shading to white and there is some red on the upper tail coverts. Its bill is a blue-grey edged with black, and iris is brown. The female is duller overall, with an olive-brown head and chest, duller yellow forehead and red patch on the back of the head, and pale green belly, and more brown-grey bill. It sometimes also has a red shoulder.

== Distribution and habitat ==
The species ranges across the drier interior of the Australian continent, from Western New South Wales from Collarenebri, West Wyalong and Griffith westwards through the northwestern tip of Victoria and across South Australia and into the drier central regions of Western Australia west to the Wheatbelt and north to the Pilbara. The mulga parrot is generally encountered in pairs in arid grassland and mulga scrubland.

== Breeding ==
Breeding season is anywhere from July to December or after rainfall, with one or occasionally two broods raised depending on rainfall. A hollow in a tree is utilised for nesting, and a clutch of four to six white eggs measuring 22 x 18 mm is laid. Incubation takes 18 to 21 days and is done by the female alone, the male feeding her while she is on the nest.
