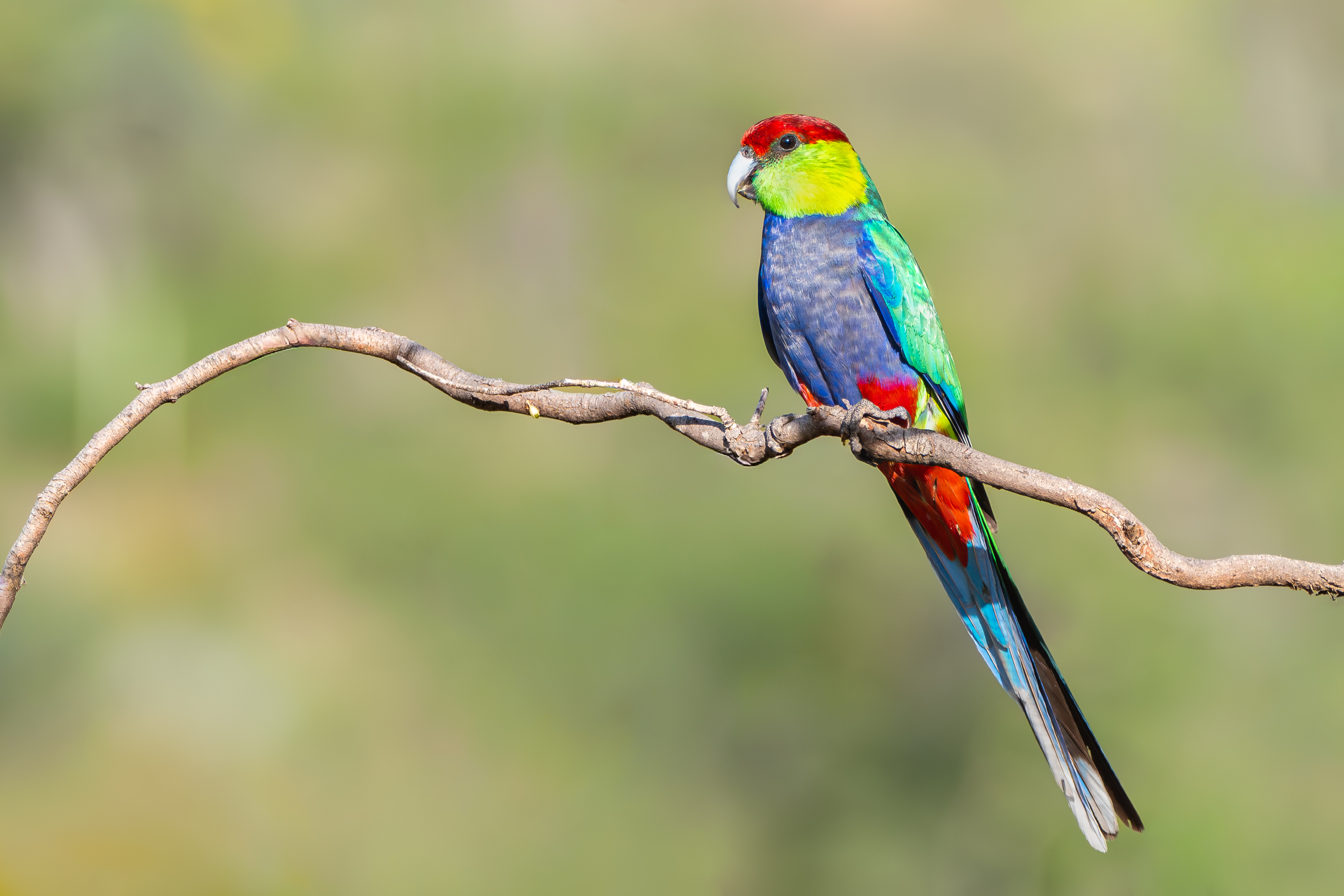
- Adult (Male), Perth Hills, Western Australia

Conservation status
- Least Concern (IUCN 3.1)

Scientific classification
- Kingdom: Animalia
- Phylum: Chordata
- Class: Aves
- Order: Psittaciformes
- Family: Psittaculidae
- Tribe: Platycercini
- Genus: Purpureicephalus; Bonaparte, 1854
- Species: P. spurius

Binomial name
- Purpureicephalus spurius (Kuhl, 1820)
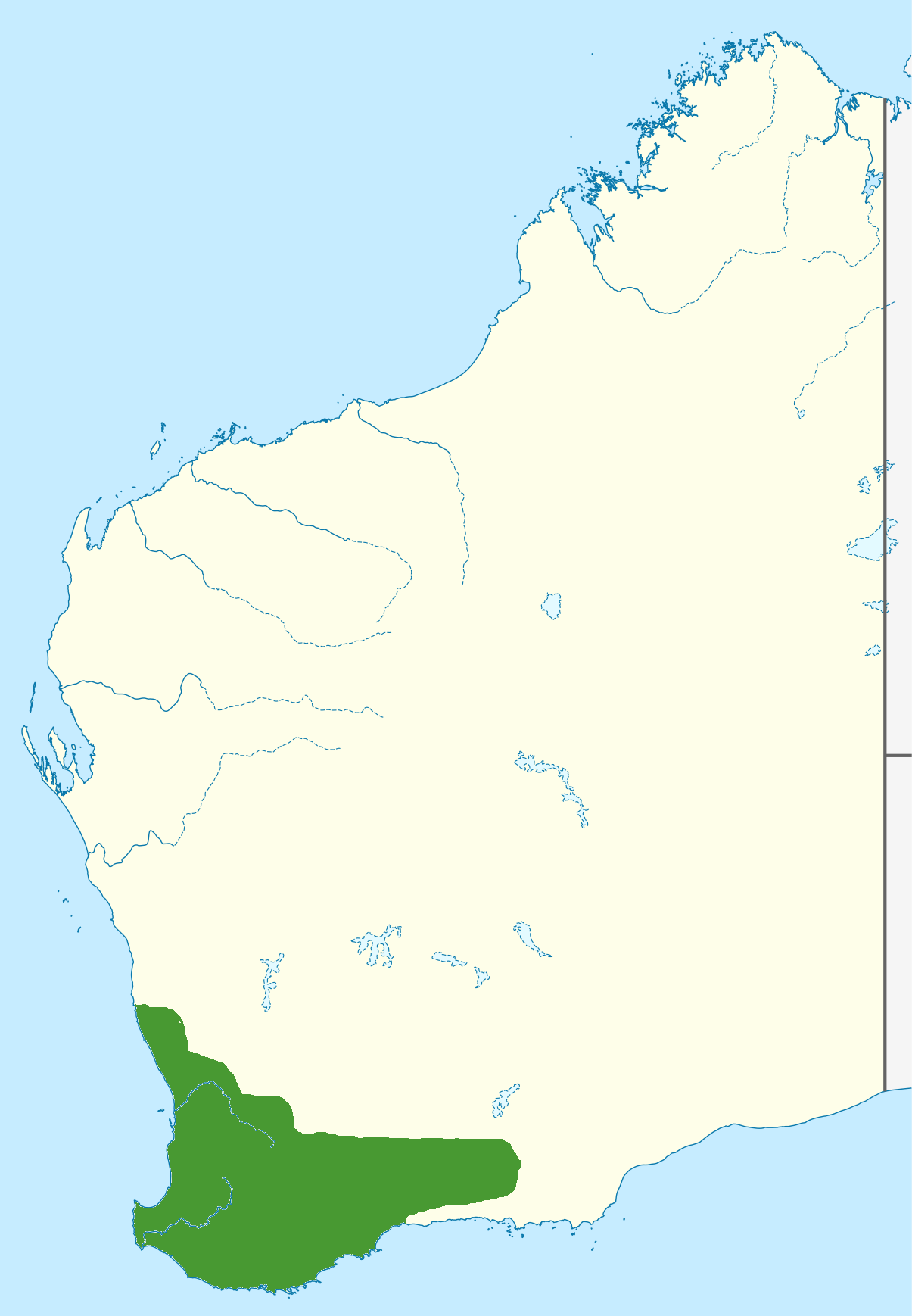
- Range in green

Synonyms
- Psittacus spurius Kuhl, 1820; Platycercus pileatus Vigors, 1830; Platycercus rufifrons Lesson, 1830; Psittacus purpureocephalus Quoy & Gaimard, 1830

= Red-capped parrot =

Species of bird endemic to Western Australia

The red-capped parrot (Purpureicephalus spurius) is a species of broad-tailed parrot native to southwestern Australia. It was described by Heinrich Kuhl in 1820, with no subspecies recognised. It has long been classified in its own genus owing to its distinctive elongated beak, though genetic analysis shows that it lies within the lineage of the Psephotellus parrots and that its closest relative is the mulga parrot (Psephotellus varius). Not easily confused with other parrot species, it has a bright crimson crown, green-yellow cheeks, and a distinctive long bill. The wings, back, and long tail are dark green, and the underparts are purple-blue. The adult female is very similar though sometimes slightly duller than the male; her key distinguishing feature is a white stripe on the wing under-surface. Juveniles are predominantly green.

Found in woodland and open savannah country, the red-capped parrot is predominantly herbivorous, consuming seeds, particularly of eucalypts, as well as flowers and berries, but insects are occasionally eaten. Nesting takes place in tree hollows, generally of older large trees. Although the red-capped parrot has been shot as a pest and has been affected by land clearing, the population is growing and the species is considered of least-concern by the International Union for Conservation of Nature (IUCN). It has a reputation of being anxious and difficult to breed in captivity.

== Taxonomy ==
The species was described in 1820 by Heinrich Kuhl, as Psittacus spurius, from an immature specimen collected at Albany, Western Australia by the Baudin expedition (1801–1803) and deposited at the National Museum of Natural History in Paris. The specific epithet spurius is the Latin adjective meaning "illegitimate", and refers to the markedly different adult and immature plumages (hence adults and young appear unrelated). Irish naturalist Nicholas Aylward Vigors named the species Platycercus pileatus in 1830 from an adult male specimen that had been acquired by the Zoological Society of London. English artist Edward Lear illustrated the live specimen in his 1830 work Illustrations of the Family of Psittacidae, or Parrots. The species was placed in the monotypic genus Purpureicephalus—as P. pileatus—by French biologist Charles Lucien Bonaparte in 1854. The generic name is an amalgam of the Latin purpureus "purple", and the Ancient Greek kephalé "head". In this generic combination, the current name is translated as "bastard red-head". The species name pileatus was generally used until German naturalist Otto Finsch followed Kuhl in using the specific name spurius, calling it Platycercus spurius in 1868. His countryman Anton Reichenow classified Purpureicephalus as a subgenus of Platycercus before placing it in the genus Porphyreicephalus (later corrected to Porphyrocephalus), until 1912, when Australian amateur ornithologist Gregory Mathews re-established the genus as Purpureicephalus. The red-capped parrot's elongated bill and its unusual coloration—lack of cheek patches compared with Platycercus—are the main reasons for its placement in its own genus.

No subspecies are recognised currently. Mathews tentatively described a subspecies carteri in 1915 from a specimen collected at Broomehill on the basis of darker upperparts and greener cheeks; it was not considered distinct by later authors. There is no known geographical variation; five birds from Esperance had smaller bills and tarsi than individuals from elsewhere in its range, but the sample was too small to draw any conclusions.

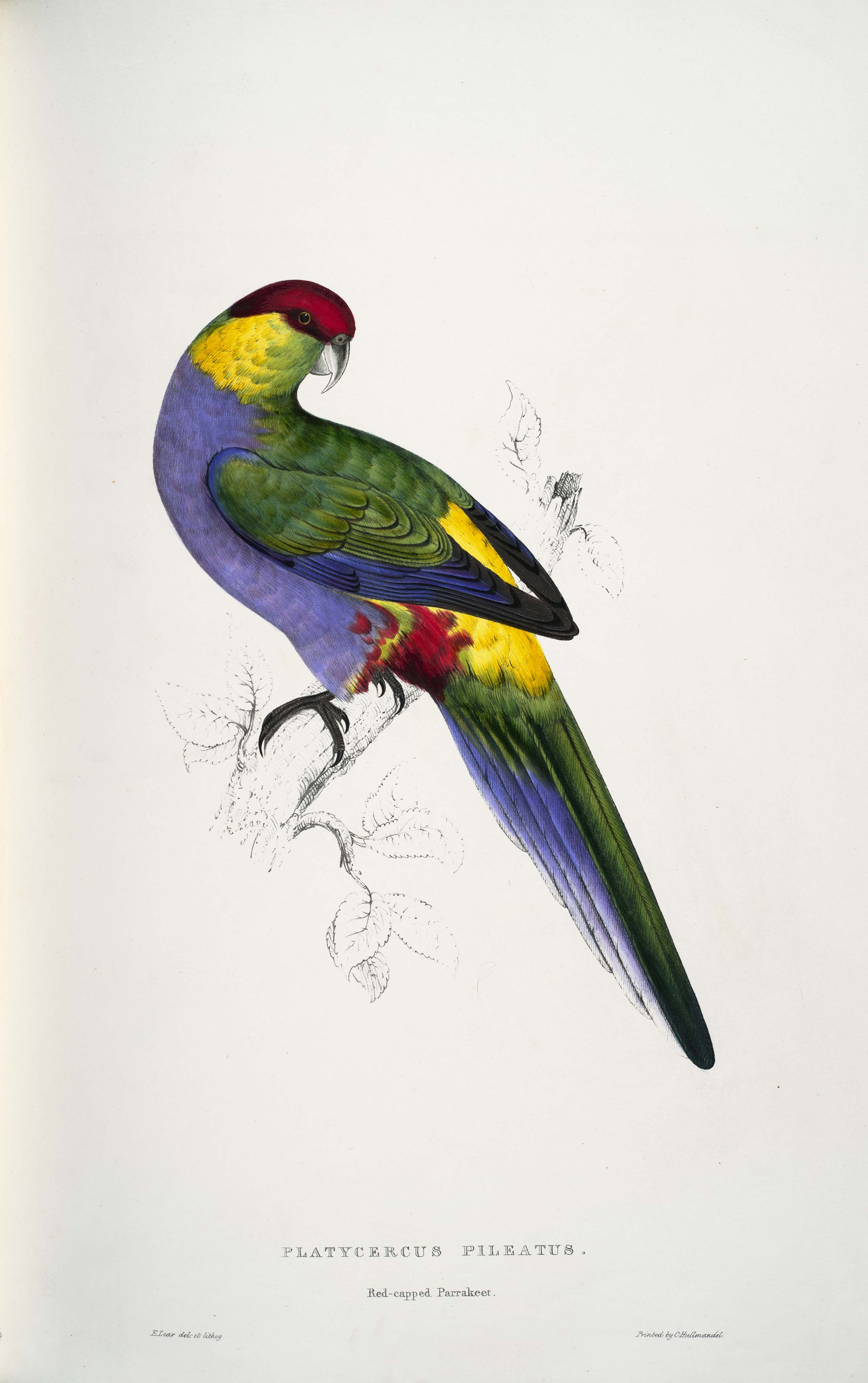
Lear's 1832 illustration

The red-capped parrot is related to other broad-tailed parrots, but relationships within the group had been unclear. In 1938, Australian ornithologist Dominic Serventy proposed that it was the sole survivor of a lineage of eastern Australian origin, with no close living relatives. In 1955, British evolutionary biologist Arthur Cain proposed that the eastern lineage had vanished after being outcompeted by the crimson rosella (Platycercus elegans), and that its closest relative was the horned parakeet (Eunymphicus cornutus) of New Caledonia, which he concluded had adopted a much greener plumage of a wetter climate. A 2011 genetic study including nuclear and mitochondrial DNA found that the red-capped parrot was closely related to the mulga parrot (Psephotellus varius), the two lineages having diverged in the Miocene. The combined lineage itself diverging from one giving rise to the hooded parrot (Psephotellus dissimilis) and golden-shouldered parrot (Psephotellus chrysopterygius).

"Red-capped parrot" has been designated the official name by the International Ornithologists' Union (IOC). English ornithologist John Gould used the name "red-capped parakeet" in 1848 based on Vigors' scientific name, which also inspired the old avicultural term "pileated parrot". It has also been called "western king parrot" to distinguish it from the Australian king parrot (Alisterus scapularis) occurring in the east, "purple-crowned parrot", "grey parrot", or "hookbill" for the distinctive upper mandible. The name "pileated parakeet" potentially causes confusion among aviarists with the South American pileated parrot (Pionopsitta pileata). Gould also reported "blue parrot" as an early colonial name. The name "king parrot" has persisted in Western Australia, English naturalist W. B. Alexander commenting that it was always known by this name in a field note in 1917, Pizzey reiterated this in a 2012 birding guide. Names in the Nyungar language, spoken by people of the southwest region, have been recorded at: Perth, Djar-rail-bur-tong and Djarrybarldung; King George Sound, Jul-u-up; Stirling Range, Chelyup; and Southwest, Djalyup. A recommended orthography and pronunciation list of Nyungar names has proposed daryl [char'rill], djarrailboordang [cha'rail'bore'dang], and djayop [cha'awp].

== Description ==
The red-capped parrot has a long bill and bright, clear patterned plumage, variously described as magnificent, gaudy, or clownishly coloured. Measuring 34–38 cm (13.5–15 in) in length with a 42–48 cm (16.5–19 in) wingspan, and weighing 105–125 g (3.7–4.4 oz), an adult red-capped parrot is a distinctive and easily recognised medium-sized parrot. The adult male has a crimson forehead and crown, which extends from the gape or base of the lower mandible through the eye and grey-brown lores. Its hindneck and cheeks are green, and its ear coverts are more yellow-green. In March and April, the crown feathers and ear coverts of birds with new plumage can have fine black edging. The feathers of the head, back and underparts, have grey bases that are generally hidden. The upperparts, including the wings, are dark green, the rump yellow-green, and the tail is green with a dark blue tip. The underparts are purplish-blue, the flanks green and red, and the iris dark brown with a dark grey eye ring. The bill is pale blue-grey with a dark grey tip, its upper mandible elongated to a slender hook.

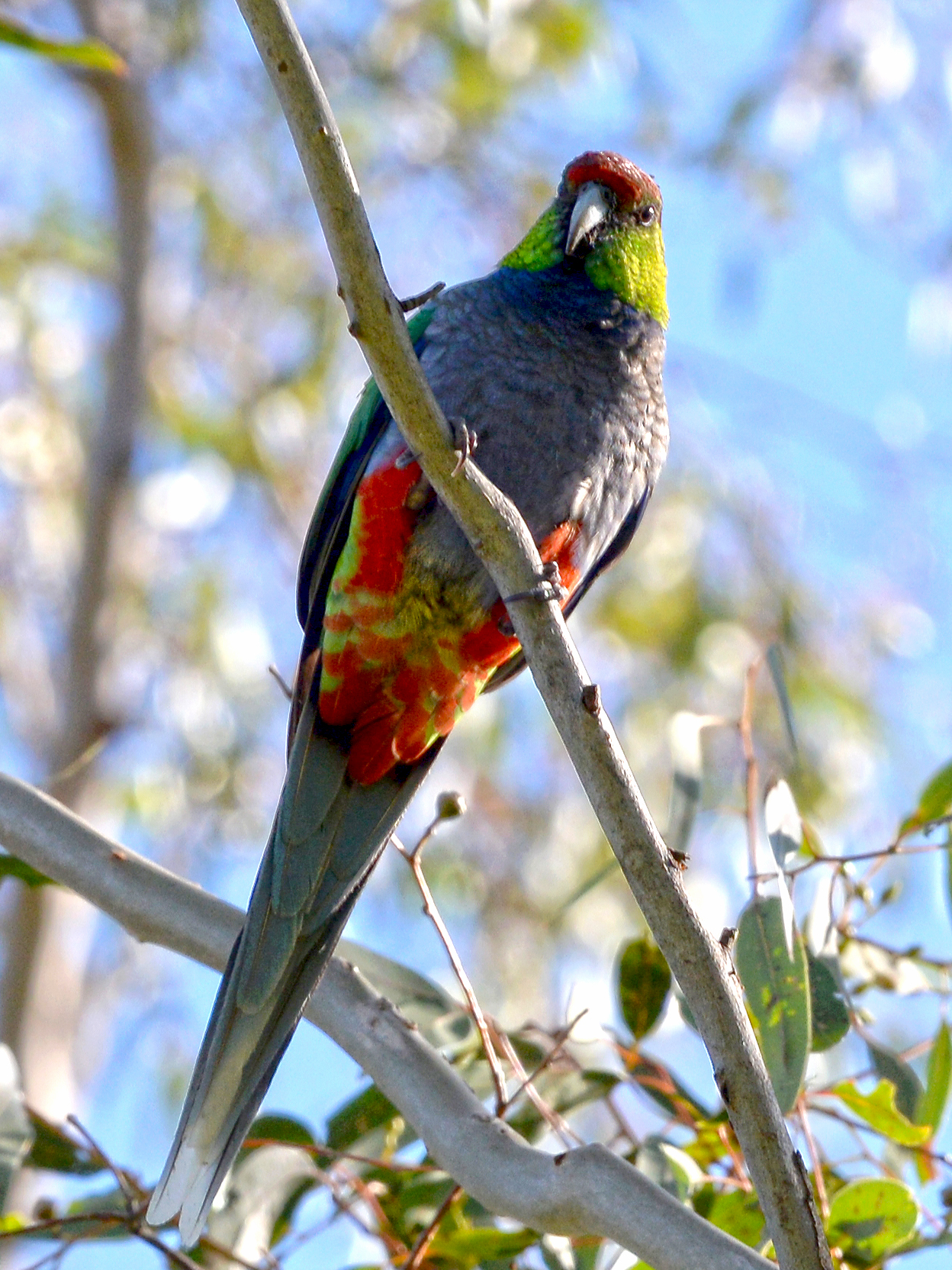
Adult female, showing green spotting of red flanks

The colouring of the female is similar to, though slightly duller than that of the male; the red of its plumage is not as intense and its red flanks are spotted with some green and yellow. Its breast is a more greyish shade of violet than purple. In flight, it has a whitish stripe visible on the underside of the wing. Female birds have white spots on seven or more underwing feathers, although a few of both sexes lack spots entirely. Birds with white spots on fewer than seven wing feathers can be either female or subadult male. The male has a slightly wider and flatter head, noticeable when birds are compared directly with each other, as well as longer wings and tail. Adult moulting takes place in the Southern Hemisphere summer and autumn. The red-capped parrot perches and walks with a distinctive upright posture.

Juveniles have greenish plumage overall, before beginning their first moult around August. Their subsequent plumage much more closely resembles that of adult birds. The faintly seen markings of the adult pattern begin as a dark green crown, with a reddish frontal band, the grey-violet of the female breast, and red underparts mottled green. The bill is more orange, but turns the pale blue-grey of adult birds by two to five months of age. Juvenile birds with white spots on ten or fewer feathers on the wing undersurface are male, while those with more cannot be sexed. Male subadults often have residual white spots on their wing feathers.

The rapidly repeated contact call has been transcribed as krukk-rak or crrr-uk, while the alarm call consists of a series of high-pitched loud notes. Male birds chatter loudly when agitated or marking their nest territory, but, unlike rosellas, not while feeding. Nestlings and fledglings up to two weeks post leaving the nest make a high-pitched two-syllable food begging call.

== Distribution and habitat ==
The red-capped parrot occurs in the Southwest Australia ecoregion in dense to open forest and woodland, and heathland in coastal regions. The distribution range is south from Moore River to the coast to Esperance. Records of the species extend inland from the southern coast, as far as Gingin and Mooliabeenee. Within its range, it is sedentary in areas of higher rainfall, and locally nomadic in dryer areas. The red-capped parrot mostly occurs within 100 km (60 mi) of the coastline, becoming sparser further inland.

The usual habitat is eucalypt forest or woodlands, but its distribution is mostly associated with marri (Corymbia calophylla). This tree species provides a constant food source and has increased in range and population since the settlement of Europeans. The parrot can be found in vegetation dominated by other tree species such as jarrah (Eucalyptus marginata), tuart (E. gomphocephala), wandoo (E. wandoo), yate (E. cornuta), and peppermint (Agonis flexuosa). A seed-eating bird, it is encountered in farmland, orchards, and suburban landscapes in Perth. It also occurs around remnant stands of marri conserved as shade trees on farmland in the western Wheatbelt and Swan Coastal Plain. It can be adversely impacted by land clearing and removal of trees. The red-capped parrot uses large trees to roost in at night and retire to during the middle of the day. It generally avoids blue gum (Eucalyptus globulus) and pine plantations.

The parrot is frequently observed at lake reserves in suburban areas on the Swan Coastal Plain, within sight of waders (Charadriiformes) occurring at freshwater to brackish wetlands. It is common at the Forrestdale and Thomsons Lakes Ramsar Site, Bibra Lake, and the Benger Swamp wetland, a region rich in avian species. It is also found at the Dryandra Woodland, another species-rich reserve with the stands of jarrah and marri over sheoak (Allocasuarina huegeliana) and dryandra (Banksia ser. Dryandra) that are known to be favoured. Red-cap parrot is commonly sighted at Two Peoples Bay Nature Reserve and along roadsides around the Stirling Range and Porongorups.

== Behaviour ==
The parrots are found in pairs or small groups of 4 to 6 individuals, or occasionally in larger flocks of 20–30 birds. Rarely a flock of up to 100 birds may be encountered; these are generally composed of juveniles. Birds may associate with Australian ringneck parrots (Barnardius zonarius) or western rosellas (Platycercus icterotis). The red-capped parrot is shy, and often retreats to the upper canopy of trees if disturbed, which has made study of its breeding and social behaviour difficult. Hence many aspects of these are poorly known.

The red-capped parrot is thought to be monogamous, pairs forming long-term bonds generally from around 20 months of age. Younger females have been recorded pairing with older males at 8 or 9 months old, but do not appear able to breed at this age. The male initiates courtship by following the female and making a contact call, as well as performing a courtship display. This involves it raising its crown feathers, ruffling its crown and rump feathers, lowering its wings to display its rump, and raising and flaring its tail feathers. The female often stoops low and gives out a food-begging call. These displays begin before a nest site is chosen and continue through the breeding season until around two weeks after the young have fledged.

=== Breeding ===
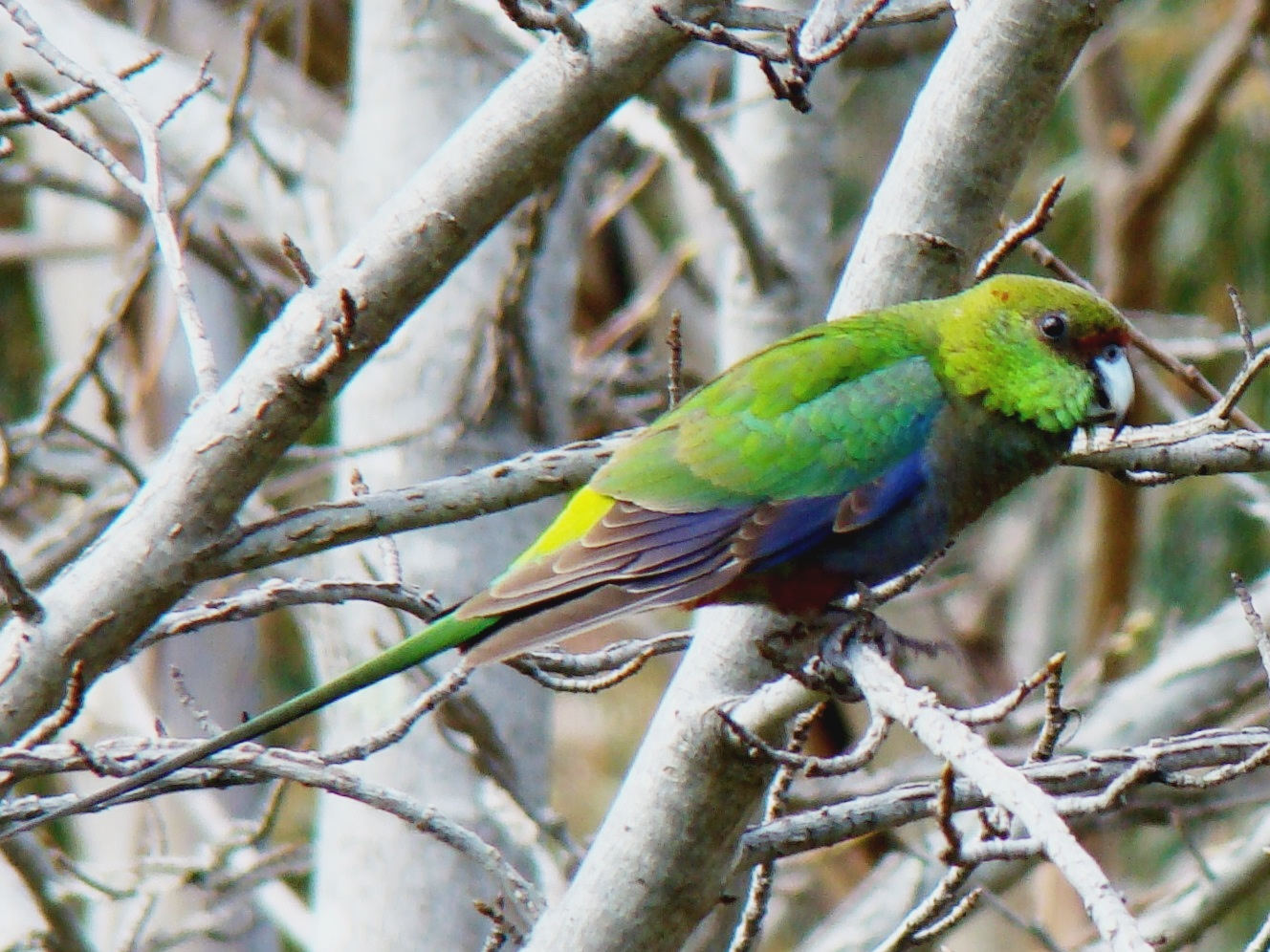
Juvenile in Perth, Australia

The breeding season is August to December. The red-capped parrot needs mature trees large enough to have hollows in the trunk or branches. These trees can be on road verges, along water courses, or in paddocks, as well as forest or woodland. Nests are generally 50–100 m (150–350 ft) apart, and pairs defend them vigorously from other birds, particularly other red-capped parrots, for the duration of nesting. The nest site is a tree hollow generally in an older large tree, such as a marri, jarrah, tuart, flooded gum (Eucalyptus rudis) or paperbark (Melaleuca spp.), at a height between 4.5 and 16 metres (15 and 52 ft), averaging around 9.6 m (31 ft) above the ground and often north or east-facing. A lower entrance, narrow with a larger hollow, recorded at 3 metres (10 ft) was considered exceptional. There are often chew marks at the entrance, which is 70–170 millimetres (2.8–6.7 in) wide. The hollow is 190 and 976 mm (7.5 and 38.4 in) deep and is lined with wood dust at the bottom. The female incubates her clutch of usually five, occasionally six (records up to nine), milk-white eggs. The size of each almost spherical egg is 28 mm × 22 mm (1.10 in × 0.87 in). The male attends her from a nearby tree, signalling to leave the nest for food he has brought. Information on the incubation period is limited, but is between 20 and 24 days.

The nestlings are nidicolous—they remain in the nest initially, weighing 4–6 g (0.14–0.21 oz) at birth and gaining, on average, 4.1 g (0.14 oz) a day. At birth they are covered in white down, which is soon replaced by grey down. Their eyes open by 9–11 days of age, and primary quills appear by 9–15 days and primary feathers proper by 14–20 days. They are fed by the female alone for the first two weeks, then by both parents. They fledge between 30 and 37 days, generally all leaving the nest on the same day. The parents continue to feed them for another two weeks.

=== Feeding ===
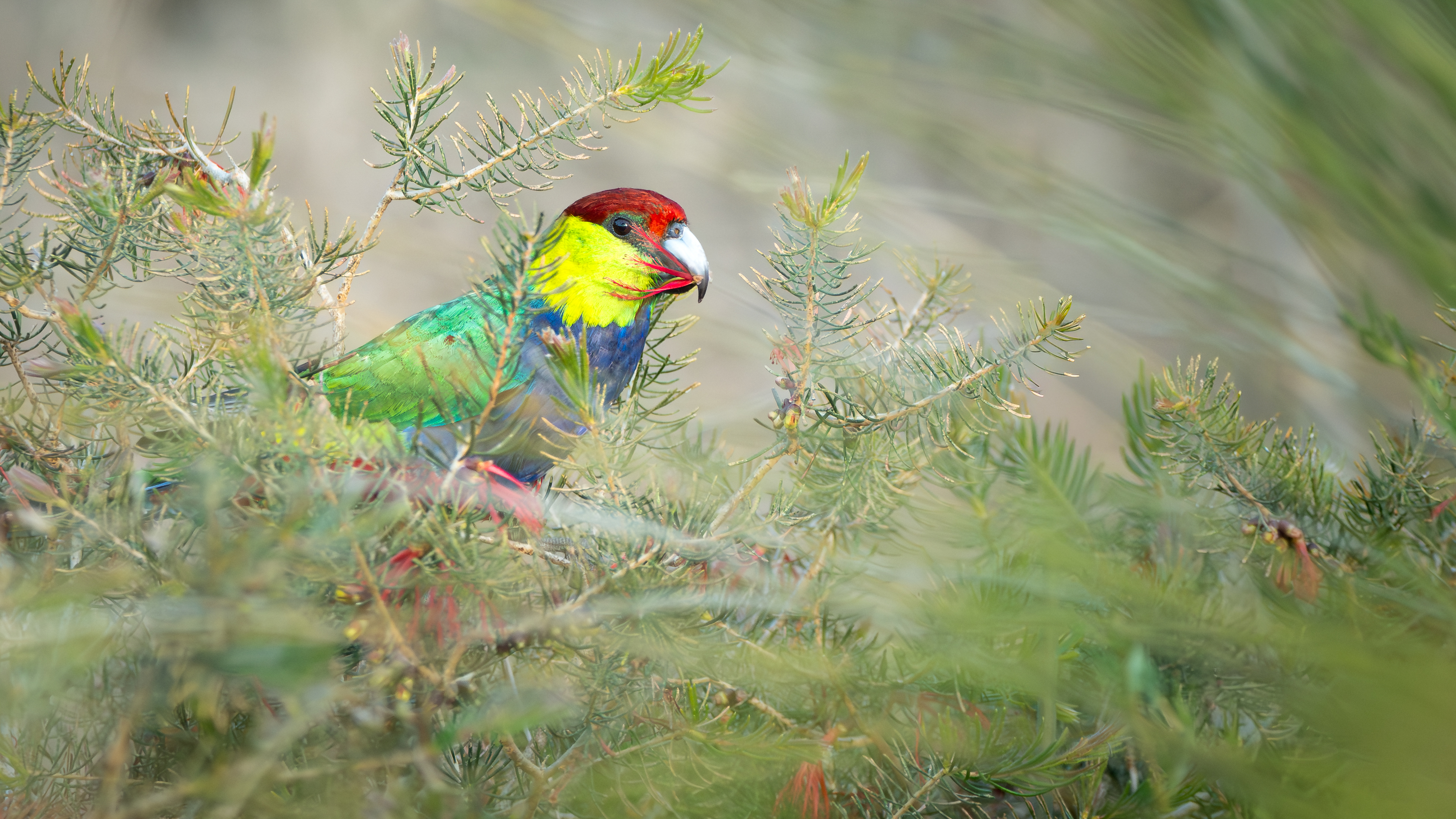
Feeding on Calothamnus

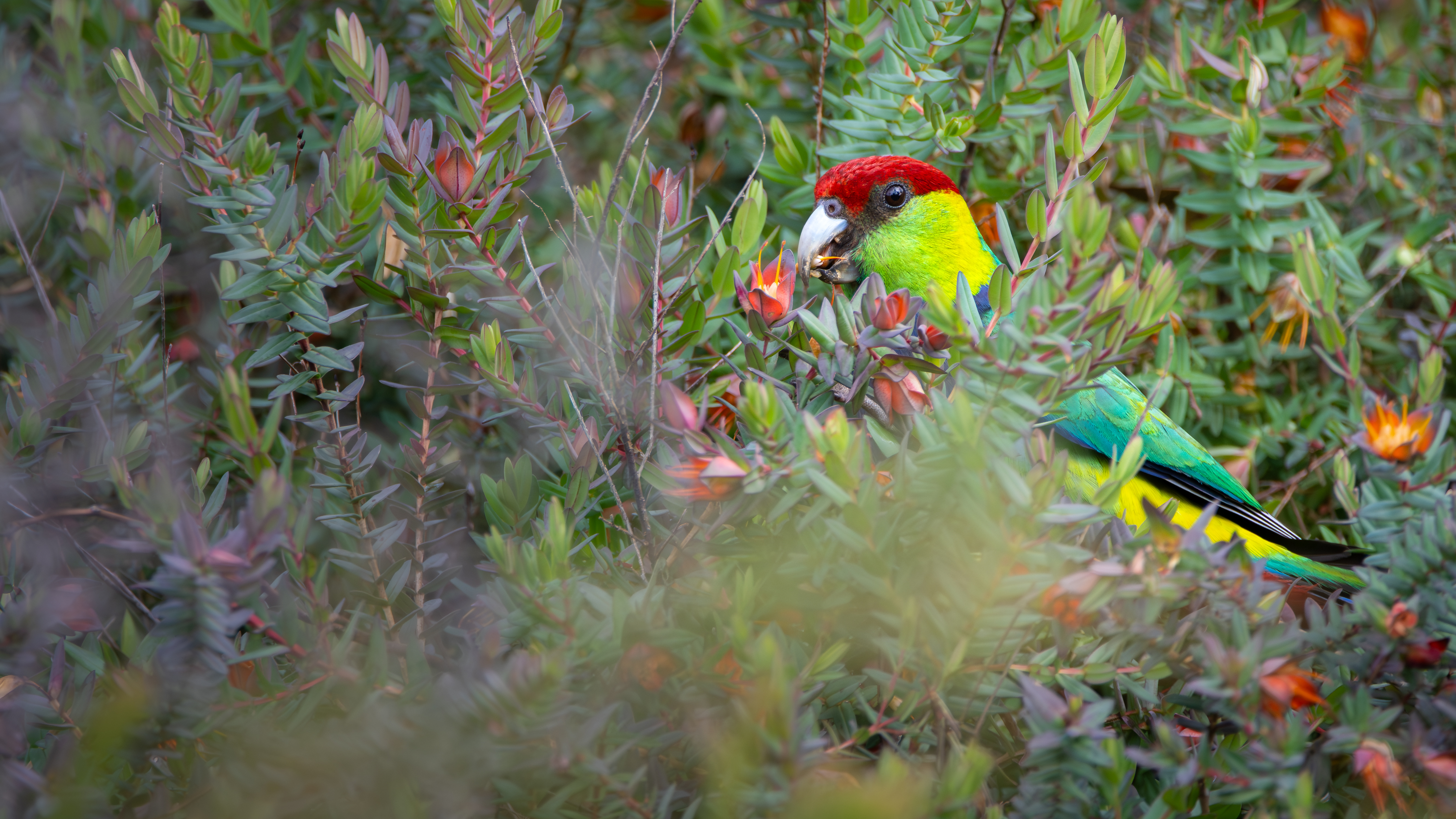
Feeding on Darwinia citriodora

Marri seeds are the preferred diet, but it also extracts seeds from karri (Eucalyptus diversicolor), woody pear (Xylomelum), Grevillea, Hakea, dryandra (Banksia) and sheoak (Casuarina, Allocasuarina), mangite (Banksia grandis), as well as from grasses, herbs, or shrubs associated with marri-dominated vegetation types. The beak of this parrot allows more precision to obtain seeds from a eucalypt's capsule, the tough case of marri is chewed through by the ringneck parrot or cleaved by the powerful beak of cockatoos (Cacatuidae species). The immature fruit of marri is also consumed. A grass species—wild oats (Avena fatua)—and acacia are grazed for green seed. Records of feeding on acacia seed pods include Acacia celastrifolia, A. dentifera, A. oncinophylla and A. restiacea, which occur in its range, and stripping pods for small seed of cultivated Acacia merinthophora. The nectar-filled blooms of kangaroo paws (Anigozanthos sp.) are also sought out, although, unlike the honeyeater and spinebill, their weight breaks the long stalk when feeding. Any viable seed that is consumed may be undigested and dispersed.

Although the red-capped parrot eats fewer introduced plant species than other parrots, it does eat the seeds of slender thistle (Carduus pycnocephalus), sheep thistle (C. tenuiflorus), and variegated thistle (Silybum marianum). The species has also adapted to exploit the introduction of orchard fruit such as apples and pears and the gardens of suburban areas. The red-capped parrot bites predominantly red-skinned apples, attempting to retrieve the seed from inside. It does not eat the flesh but instead squeezes it to drink the juice. The fruit of other cultivated introductions are also selected, including almond, nectarine, olive, peaches, plums, pomegranates, and white cedar (Melia azedarach). Insects such as psyllids also form part of their diet. Insect larvae and lerp are also consumed, particularly in late winter and spring during its breeding season.

The red-capped parrot primarily feeds on the ground, clasping the capsule of eucalypts or cones of sheoak with one foot and extracting the seed with their slender hooked beak. The dexterity it exhibits using its foot and beak to dislodge seeds is also shown by the long-billed black cockatoo (Calyptorhynchus baudinii). The two occur in the same habitat, both specialising in extracting the marri's store of large seeds. Both species prise marri seeds out of their woody capsule by manipulating it with the foot and lower mandible, and inserting the point of the upper mandible at openings in the seed-dispersing valve. The marks left by the lower mandible on the marri's nut distinguish it from those fed on by other parrots and cockatoos. The red-capped parrot leaves shallow marks around the opening of the capsule, with little damage to the husk. The species mainly feeds and manipulates objects with its left foot; limited sampling of Australian parrot species indicates that laterality is associated with larger size, and many of these are left-footed, though two other broad-tailed parrot species (crimson rosella and Australian ringneck) are right-footed, and smaller species show no preference.

== Parasites and diseases ==
A parasitic protozoan, Eimeria purpureicephali, was isolated and described from a diseased bird in 2016. It is an intracellular parasite that lives in the host's gastrointestinal system. Species of bird louse recorded on the red-capped parrot include Forficuloecus palmai, Heteromenopon kalamundae and a member of the genus Neopsittaconirmus. Psittacine beak and feather disease virus was isolated and sequenced from a fledgling in 2016.

== Conservation ==
Due to damage to orchard crops, these birds have been classified and shot as pests, although 1985 fieldwork in orchards around Balingup showed that the damage they inflicted was insignificant. Local government acts in the agricultural districts of Collie and West Arthur classed them as vermin in 1943. Despite this, their population is growing, possibly due to existing areas being degraded to a more favourable habitat. On account of this and its large range, it is considered to be a least-concern species by the International Union for Conservation of Nature (IUCN), though it has declined in the shires north of Perth as marri forests have vanished with urban development. Like most species of parrots, the red-capped parrot is protected by the Convention on International Trade in Endangered Species of Wild Fauna and Flora (CITES) with its placement on the Appendix II list of vulnerable species, which makes the import, export, and trade of wild-caught animals illegal.

== Aviculture ==
Its attractive colours make the red-capped parrot a desirable species to keep, although it has a reputation for being anxious in captivity and difficult to breed. This may be because of historically high proportion of wild-caught birds entering aviculture. The first record of successful reproduction in captivity was in England, almost simultaneously by two aviculturalists in 1909, the slightly earlier hatching of one brood saw Mr. Astley awarded a medal by the nation's Avicultural Society.
