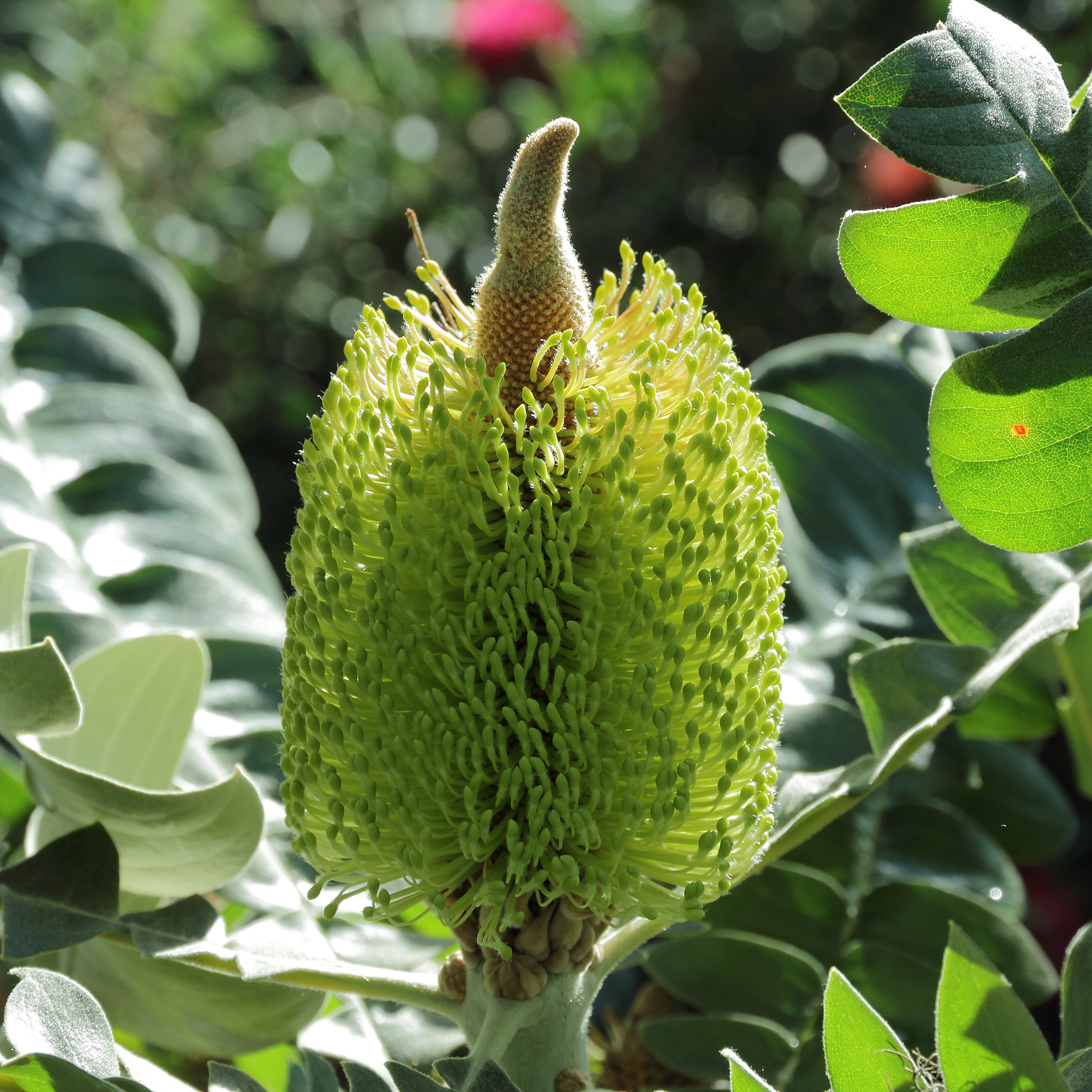

Scientific classification
- Kingdom: Plantae
- Clade: Tracheophytes
- Clade: Angiosperms
- Clade: Eudicots
- Order: Proteales
- Family: Proteaceae
- Genus: Banksia
- Subgenus: Banksia subg. Banksia
- Section: Banksia sect. Banksia
- Series: Banksia ser. Grandes
- Species: B. grandis

Binomial name
- Banksia grandis Willd.

Synonyms
- Sirmuellera grandis (Willd.) Kuntze

= Banksia grandis =

Bull banksia

Species of tree in Western Australia

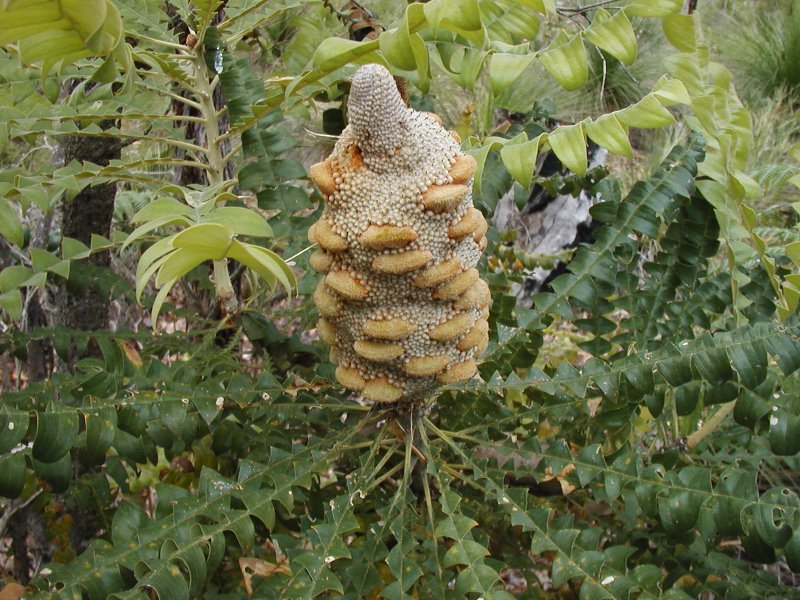
Banksia grandis, developing follicles, with new growth behind

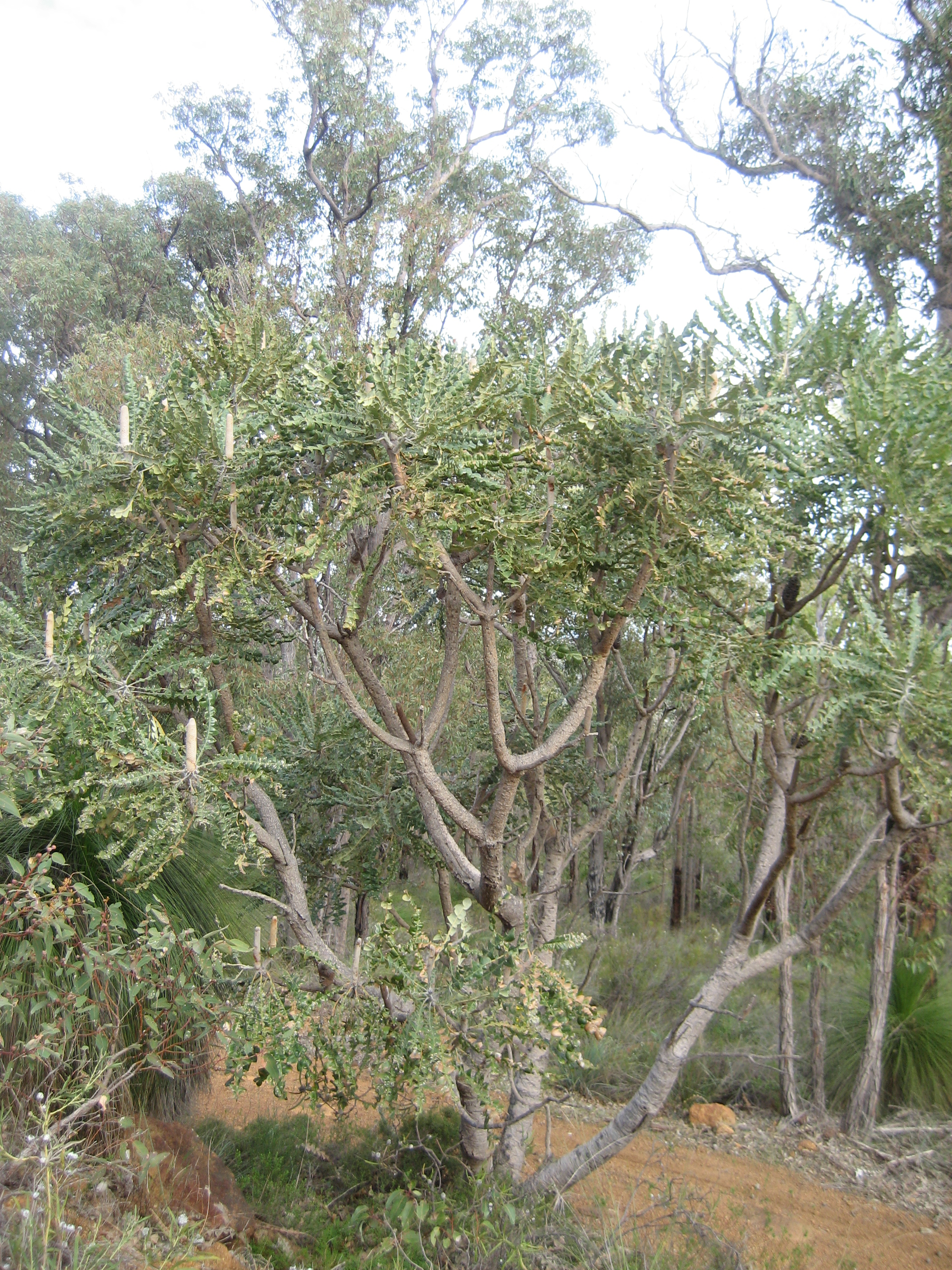
Banksia grandis habit

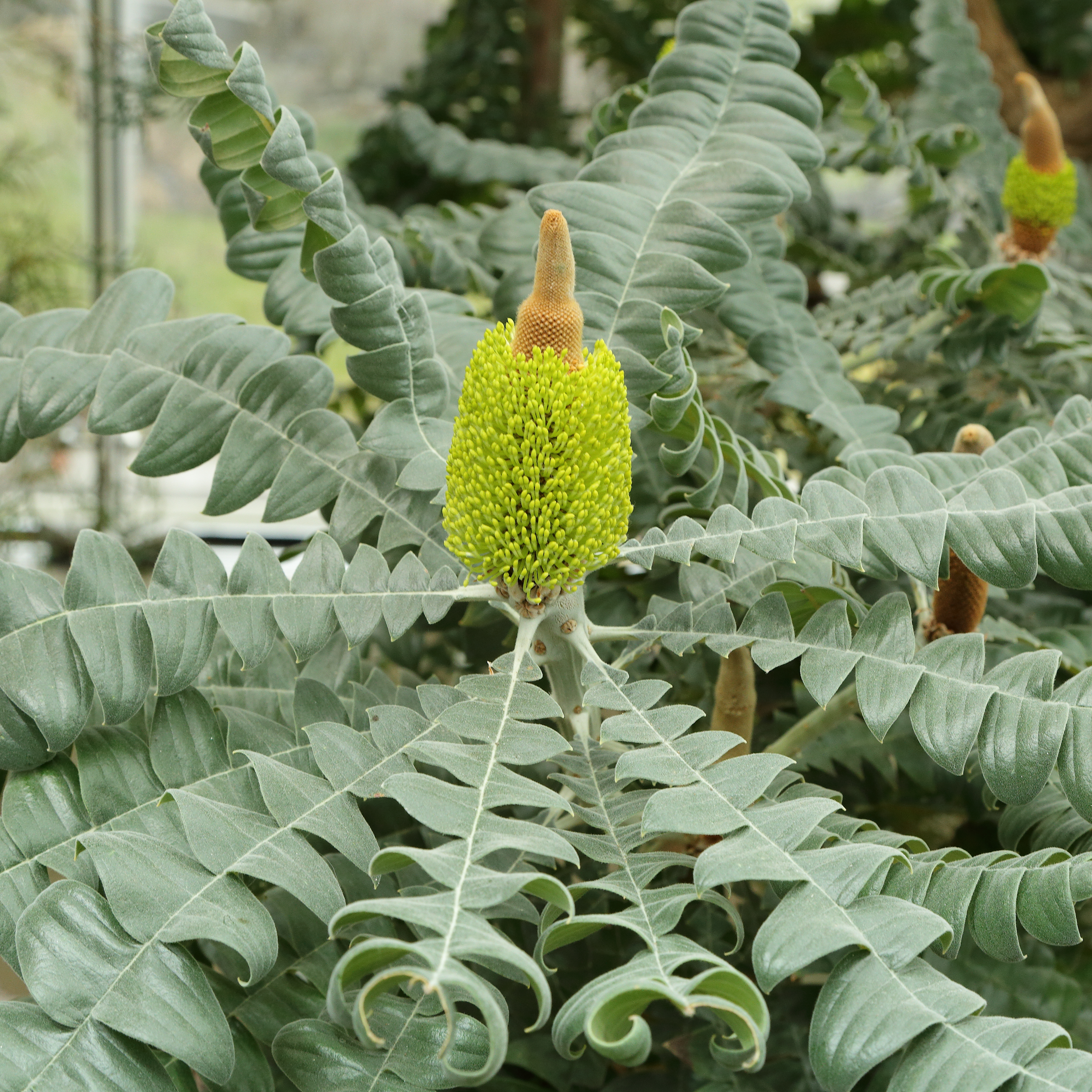
Banksia grandis flower spike and foliage

Banksia grandis, commonly known as bull banksia or giant banksia, is a species of common and distinctive tree in the south-west of Western Australia. The Noongar peoples know the tree as beera, biara, boongura, gwangia, pira or peera. It has a fire-resistant main stem with thick bark, pinnatisect leaves with triangular side-lobes, pale yellow flowers and elliptical follicles in a large cone.

== Description ==
Banksia grandis is usually a tree that typically grows to a height of 5–10 m (16–33 ft) high, sometimes to 15 m (49 ft). It is also found in the form of a stunted, spreading shrub near the south coast, and whenever it occurs among granite rocks. Its trunks are short, stout and often crooked, with the rough grey bark characteristic of Banksia. The leaves are pinnatisect 100–450 mm (3.9–17.7 in) long and 30–110 mm (1.2–4.3 in) wide on a petiole 10–35 mm (0.4–1.4 in) long, with between eight and twelve large triangular lobes on each side of the leaf. The leaves are shiny dark green on the upper surface and softy-hairy underneath. The flowers are borne in a spike that is 100–400 mm (3.9–15.7 in) long and 70–90 mm (2.8–3.5 in) wide at flowering time with hairy involucral bracts up to 25 mm (1.0 in) long at the base of the head. The flowers are pale yellow with cream-coloured styles, the perianth 26–35 mm (1.0–1.4 in) long and the pistil 35–40 mm (1.4–1.6 in) long. Flowering occurs from October to January and the follicles are elliptical, 17–25 mm (0.7–1.0 in) long, 3–10 mm (0.12–0.39 in) high and 6–12 mm (0.24–0.47 in) wide on a massive cone. The old flower fall early and the follicles usually open as they mature. A seed from the south coast raised in Kings Park had retained its spreading habit as at 1981.

== Taxonomy and naming ==
Banksia grandis was first formally described in 1798 by Carl Ludwig Willdenow in the fourth edition of the book Species Plantarum. The specific epithet grandis is a Latin word meaning 'great', 'large' or 'tall'.

In 1891, Otto Kuntze, in his Revisio Generum Plantarum, rejected the generic name Banksia L.f., on the grounds that the name Banksia had previously been published in 1776 as Banksia J.R.Forst & G.Forst, referring to the genus now known as Pimelea. Kuntze proposed Sirmuellera as an alternative, referring to this species as Sirmuellera grandis. This application of the principle of priority was largely ignored by Kuntze's contemporaries, and Banksia L.f. was formally conserved and Sirmuellera rejected in 1940.

Banksia grandis is a member of Banksia series Grandes, a series containing only B. grandis and the closely related species B. solandri.

== Distribution ==
Bull banksia grows in woodland and heath on the coastal plain between Mount Lesueur and Cape Leeuwin, east to Cape Riche and inland to Woodanilling. It is common in the jarrah forest on the Darling Range.

== Ecology ==
Species of nectarivorous birds that have been observed feeding on B. grandis include Anthochaera carunculata (red wattlebird). Purpureicephalus spurius (red-capped parrot) has also been recorded feeding upon the seed, as have black cockatoos, though it is not clear which species of black cockatoo was observed, Zanda baudinii (Baudin's black cockatoo) or Z. latirostris (Carnaby's black cockatoo).

== Uses ==
=== Use in horticulture ===
Bull banksia is not often cultivated and is slow-growing, taking ten years or more to flower from seed. It is very sensitive to dieback and is difficult to grow in regions of summer humidity. It requires a well-drained sandy soil. Seeds do not require any treatment, and take 22 to 42 days to germinate.

=== Use by Indigenous people ===
The flowers of Banksia grandis were known as mangyt, pulgarla or Bool gal la by the Indigenous peoples who live within its range. The flowers were steeped in water or sucked to obtain nectar.
