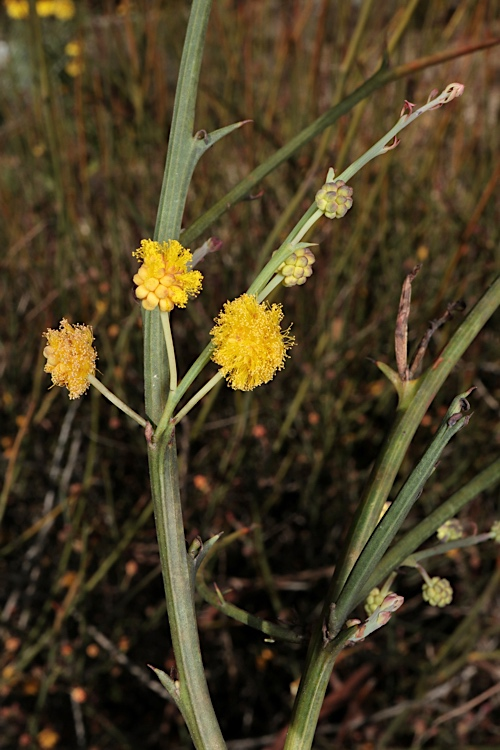

Scientific classification
- Kingdom: Plantae
- Clade: Embryophytes
- Clade: Tracheophytes
- Clade: Spermatophytes
- Clade: Angiosperms
- Clade: Eudicots
- Clade: Rosids
- Order: Fabales
- Family: Fabaceae
- Subfamily: Caesalpinioideae
- Clade: Mimosoid clade
- Genus: Acacia
- Species: A. daviesioides

Binomial name
- Acacia daviesioides C.A.Gardner
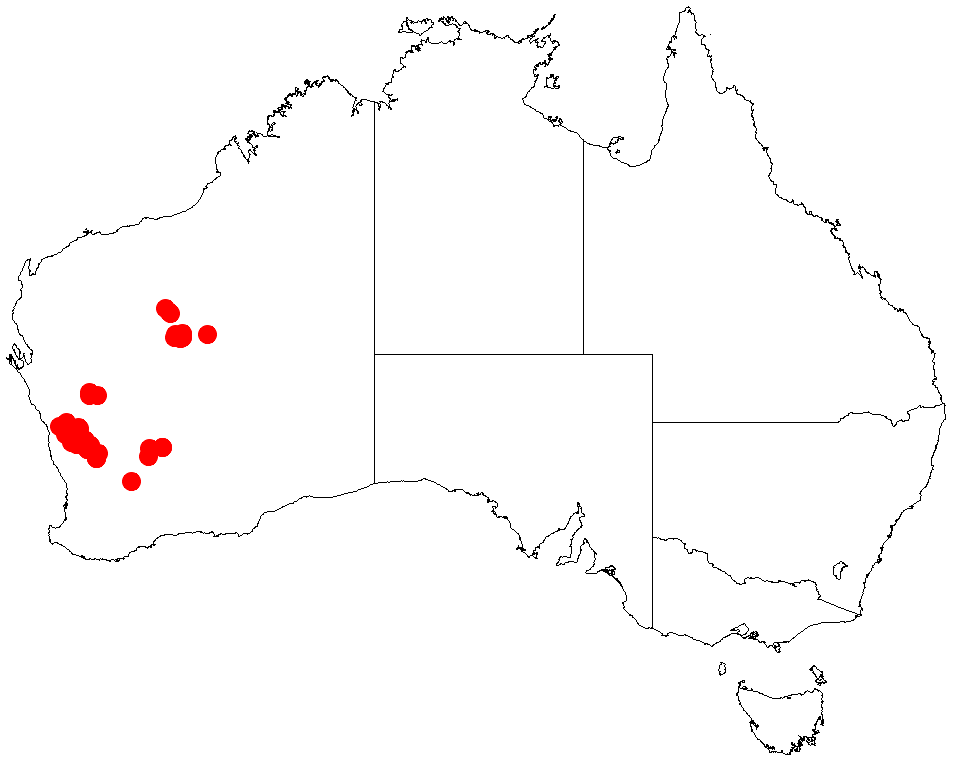
- Occurrence data from AVH

Synonyms
- Racosperma daviesioides (C.A.Gardner) Pedley

= Acacia daviesioides =

Species of legume

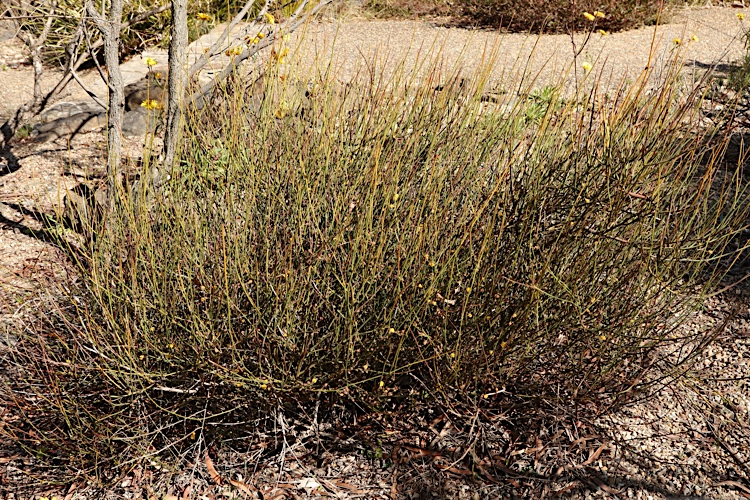
Habit in the Australian National Botanic Gardens

Acacia daviesioides is a species of flowering plant in the family Fabaceae and is endemic to Western Australia. It is an intricate, glabrous shrub with sharply pointed, linear phyllodes that are continuous with the branchlets, spherical heads of light golden yellow flowers and linear, leathery to crusty pods.

== Description ==
Acacia daviesioides is an intricate, glabrous shrub that typically grows to a height of 0.3–1 m (1 ft 0 in – 3 ft 3 in) and has many straight, more or less glaucous branches. Its phyllodes are linear, rigid, spiny and continuous with the branchlets, more or less glaucous, 2–10 mm (0.079–0.394 in) long and narrowed near the tip. There are linear stipules 1–3 mm (0.039–0.118 in) long at the base of the phyllodes. The flowers are borne in spherical heads in up to 3 racemes on peduncles 3–10 mm (0.12–0.39 in) long, the heads with 15 to 24 light golden yellow flowers. Flowering occurs from June to September, and the pods are linear, up to 80 mm (3.1 in) long and 3–5 mm (0.12–0.20 in) wide and leathery to crusty with broadly oblong to oblong seeds 2.5–3.0 mm (0.098–0.118 in) long with a large aril.

== Taxonomy ==
Acacia daviesioides was first formally described in 1942 by the botanist Charles Austin Gardner in the Journal of the Royal Society of Western Australia. The specific epithet (daviesioides) means 'Daviesia-like'.

== Distribution and habitat ==
This species of wattle grows in sand, loam and sandy-clay on sandplains and stony screes in heath, open scrub or shrubland. It has a disjunct distribution, occurring from Mingenew to Ballidu-Kalannie with an outlier at Jingemarra Station, and near Mount Jackson, in the Avon Wheatbelt, Coolgardie, Gascoyne, Geraldton Sandplains, Little Sandy Desert, Murchison bioregions of Western Australia.

== Conservation status ==
Acacia daviesioides is listed as "not threatened" by the Government of Western Australia Department of Biodiversity, Conservation and Attractions.

== See also ==
- List of Acacia species
