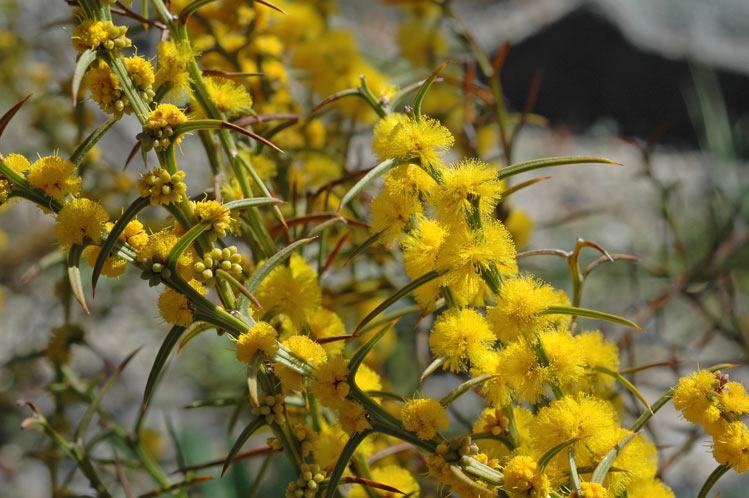
- In the Australian National Botanic Gardens

Scientific classification
- Kingdom: Plantae
- Clade: Embryophytes
- Clade: Tracheophytes
- Clade: Spermatophytes
- Clade: Angiosperms
- Clade: Eudicots
- Clade: Rosids
- Order: Fabales
- Family: Fabaceae
- Subfamily: Caesalpinioideae
- Clade: Mimosoid clade
- Genus: Acacia
- Species: A. incurva

Binomial name
- Acacia incurva Benth.
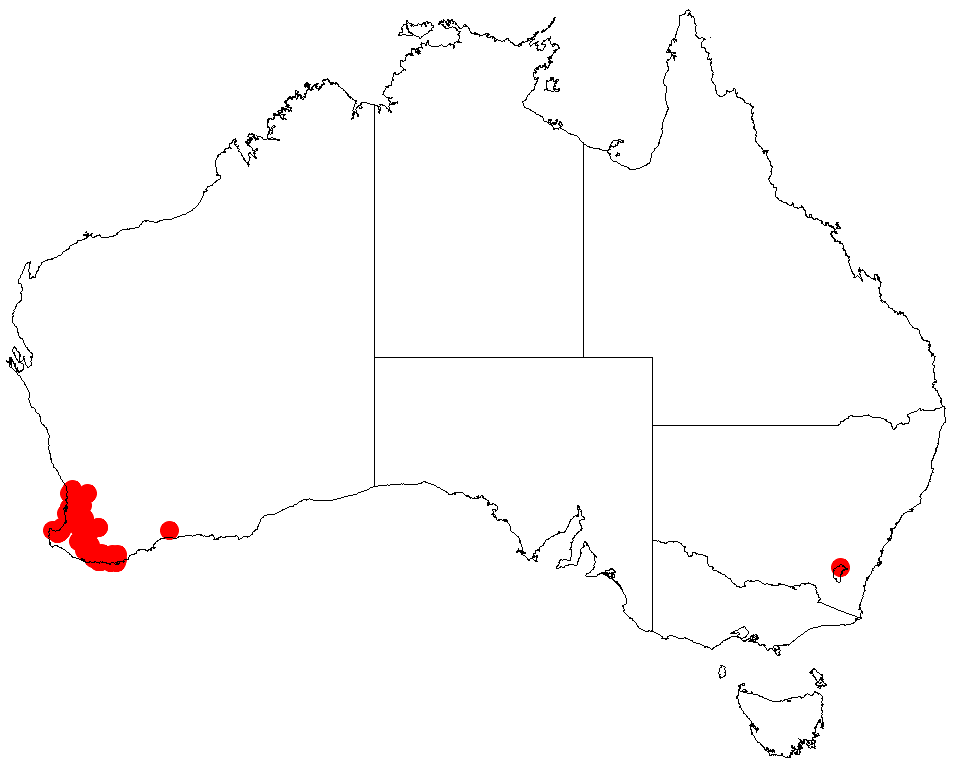
- Occurrence data from AVH

Synonyms
- Acacia brachyptera Benth.; Acacia incurva var. brachyptera (Benth.) Benth.; Acacia incurva Benth. var. incurva; Racosperma incurvum (Benth.) Pedley

= Acacia incurva =

Species of legume

Acacia incurva is a species of flowering plant in the family Fabaceae and is endemic to the south-west of Western Australia. It is low, multi-stemmed, erect or prostrate, spiny shrub or subshrub with phyllodes continuous with the branchlets, the free portion linear and usually shallowly curved, flowers borne in sessile spherical heads and terete, crusty pods.

== Description ==
Acacia incurva is a low, multi-stemmed, erect, prostrate or low-lying shrub or subshrub that typically grows to a height of 20–40 cm (7.9–15.7 in) high. The phyllodes are continuous with the branchlets, facing three ways and forming very narrow wings up to 1 mm (0.039 in) wide. The free part of the phyllodes is linear to lance-shaped, straight or curved, 10–50 mm (0.39–1.97 in) long, 1–2 mm (0.039–0.079 in) wide and rigid with a sharply pointed tip. The midvein is prominent and there is an obscure gland 1–6 mm (0.039–0.236 in) above the base of the phyllode. There are stipules 1–3 mm (0.039–0.118 in) at the base of the phyllodes.

The flowers are borne in sessile, spherical heads, each head with six to eleven bright yellow flowers. Flowering occurs from June to September, and the pods are terete, up to 70 mm (2.8 in) long and about 2 mm (0.079 in) in diameter, reddish and crusty.

== Taxonomy ==
Acacia incurva was first formally described in 1842 by the botanist George Bentham in William Jackson Hooker's London Journal of Botany from specimens collected near the Vasse River by Georgina Molloy. The specific epithet (incurva) means 'bowed' or 'curved inwards'.

== Distribution and habitat ==
This species of wattle grows in sand or clay loam, in swamps or winter-wet areas in open woodland, between Perth to Bridgetown and between Albany and Denmark in the Avon Wheatbelt, Jarrah Forest, Swan Coastal Plain and Warren bioregions of south-western Western Australia.

== See also ==
- List of Acacia species
