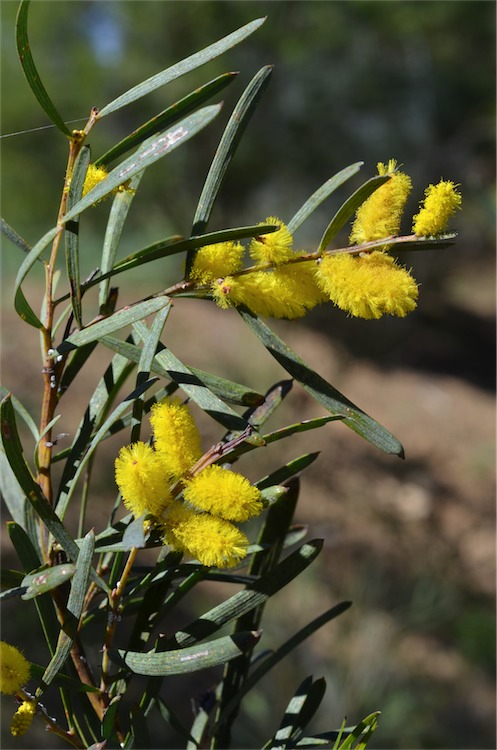
- In the Australian National Botanic Gardens

Scientific classification
- Kingdom: Plantae
- Clade: Tracheophytes
- Clade: Angiosperms
- Clade: Eudicots
- Clade: Rosids
- Order: Fabales
- Family: Fabaceae
- Subfamily: Caesalpinioideae
- Clade: Mimosoid clade
- Genus: Acacia
- Species: A. oncinophylla

Binomial name
- Acacia oncinophylla Lindl.
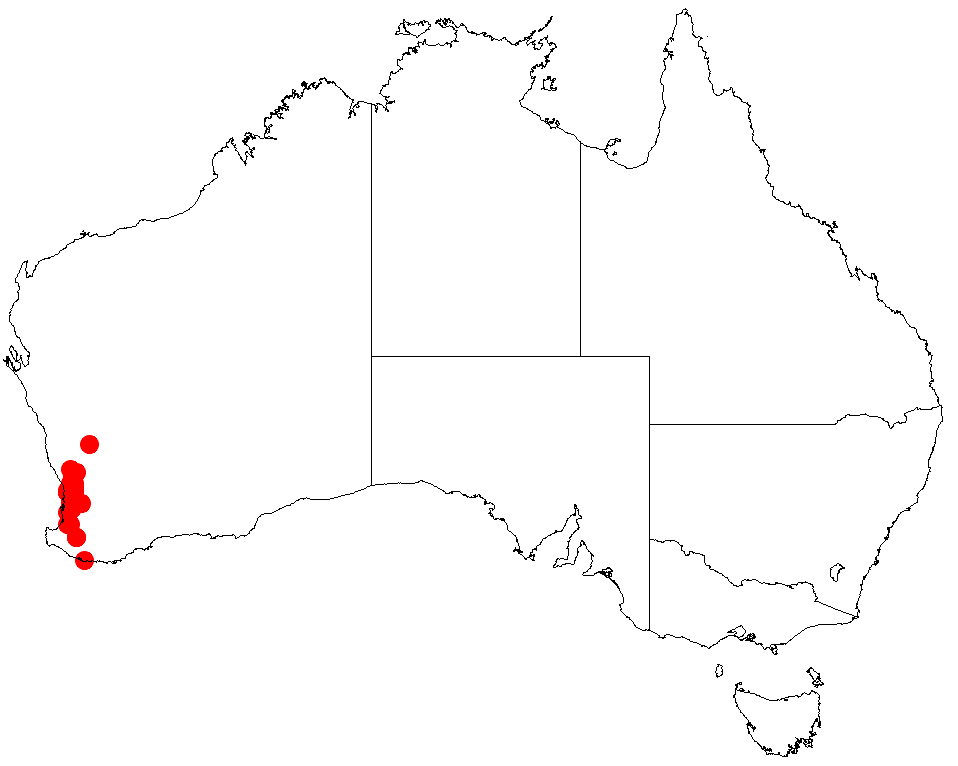
- Occurrence data from AVH

Synonyms
- Acacia uncinifolia G.Nicholson; Racosperma oncinophyllum (Lindl.) Pedley

= Acacia oncinophylla =

Hook-leaved acacia

Species of legume

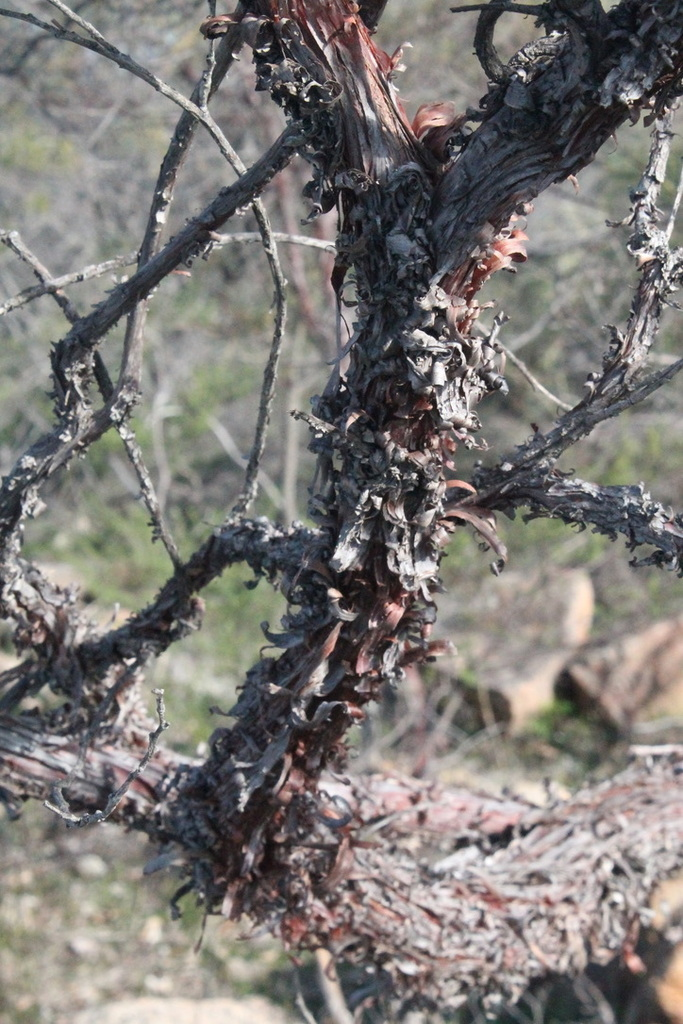
Bark of subsp. patulifolia

Acacia oncinophylla, commonly known as hook-leaved acacia, is a species of flowering plant in the family Fabaceae, and is endemic to the south-west of Western Australia. It is a shrub with minni-ritchi bark, flattened and angular branchlets, linear, straight to curved phyllodes with a pointed tip, spikes of golden yellow flowers and linear, velvety pods.

== Description ==
Acacia oncinophylla is a shrub that typically grows to a height of 1–2.5 m (3 ft 3 in – 8 ft 2 in) and has minni-ritchi bark and glabrous, flattened, angular branchlets that are hairy on its ribs and sometimes covered with a white powdery bloom. Its phyllodes are linear, straight to slightly curved, 40–130 mm (1.6–5.1 in) long, 1–6 mm (0.039–0.236 in) wide and abruptly contracted or tapered to a curved, flexible or semi-rigid, glabrous point. There are three to seven raised veins on each face of the phyllodes. The flowers are usually borne in two spikes 11–25 mm (0.43–0.98 in) long and 5–6 mm (0.20–0.24 in) in diameter, in axils on peduncles 3–8 mm (0.12–0.31 in) long, each spike with 50 to 97 golden yellow flowers. Flowering time depends on subspecies, and the pods are linear, straight to slightly curved, up to 60 mm (2.4 in) long, 5–6 mm (0.20–0.24 in) wide and covered with velvety silvery to golden yellow flowers.

== Taxonomy ==
Acacia oncinophylla was first formally described in 1839 by John Lindley in A Sketch of the Vegetation of the Swan River Colony. The specific epithet (oncinophylla) means 'bulky-leaved'.

In 1995, Richard Cowan and Bruce Maslin described two subspecies of A. oncinophylla in the journal Nuytsia, and the names are accepted by the Australian Plant Census:

- Acacia oncinophylla Lindl. subsp. oncinophylla has phyllodes mostly 80–130 mm (3.1–5.1 in) long, 1–2 mm (0.039–0.079 in) wide and spikes 11–13 mm (0.43–0.51 in) long, 5–6 mm (0.20–0.24 in) in diameter and 50 to 60 flowers on peduncles 3–5 mm (0.12–0.20 in) long, from August to October.
- Acacia oncinophylla subsp. patulifolia R.S.Cowan & Maslin has phyllodes mostly 40–90 mm (1.6–3.5 in) long, 3–6 mm (0.12–0.24 in) wide and spikes 15–25 mm (0.59–0.98 in) long and 75 to 97 flowers on peduncles 4–8 mm (0.16–0.31 in) long, mainly from August to September.

== Distribution ==
Hook-leaved acacia is scattered along the Darling Range from Mogumber to Wagerup, where it grows on hills and slopes growing in granitic or lateritic soils in the Avon Wheatbelt, Jarrah Forest and Swan Coastal Plain bioregions.

- Subspecies oncinophylla is restricted to the Darling Range in scattered location from Mogumber to Serpentine where it grows in granitic soil in heath and open woodland.
- Subspecies patulifolia is retricted to the Darling Range near Perth, and from near Pinjarra south to Wagerup where it mostly grows in granitic soil in open woodland.

== Conservation status ==
Subspecies oncinophylla is listed as 'Priority Three' by the Government of Western Australia Department of Biodiversity, Conservation and Attractions, meaning that it is poorly known and known from only a few locations but is not under imminent threat, and subsp. patulifolia as 'Priority Four', meaning that is rare or near threatened.

== See also ==
- List of Acacia species
