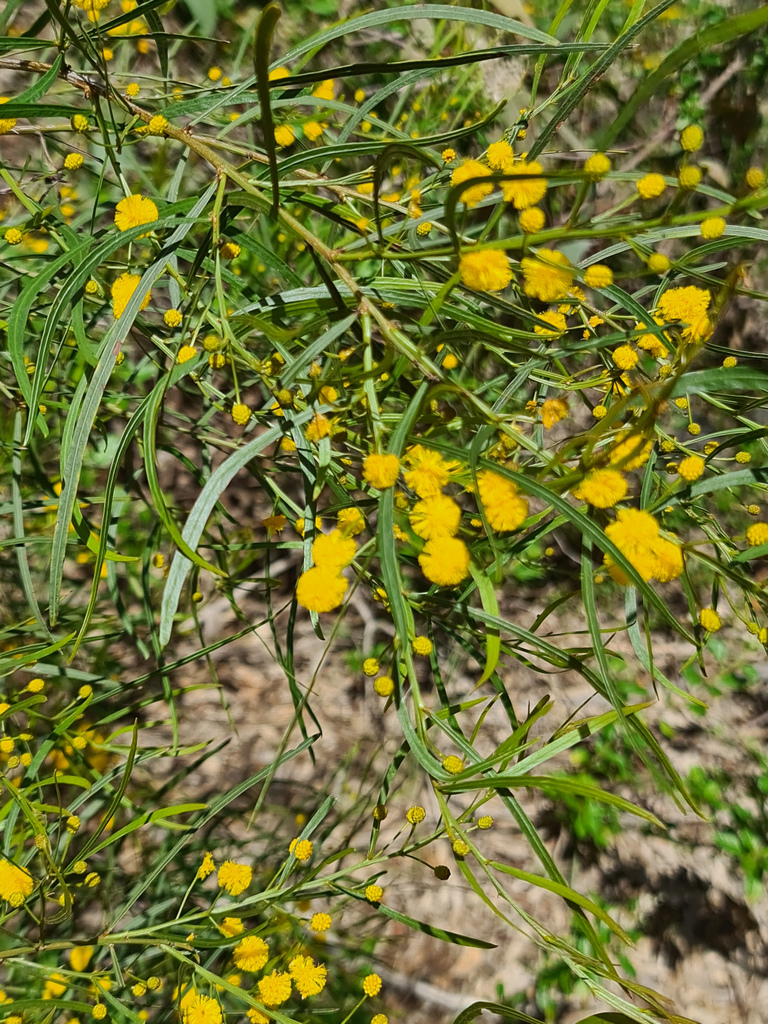

Scientific classification
- Kingdom: Plantae
- Clade: Tracheophytes
- Clade: Angiosperms
- Clade: Eudicots
- Clade: Rosids
- Order: Fabales
- Family: Fabaceae
- Subfamily: Caesalpinioideae
- Clade: Mimosoid clade
- Genus: Acacia
- Species: A. dentifera

Binomial name
- Acacia dentifera Benth.
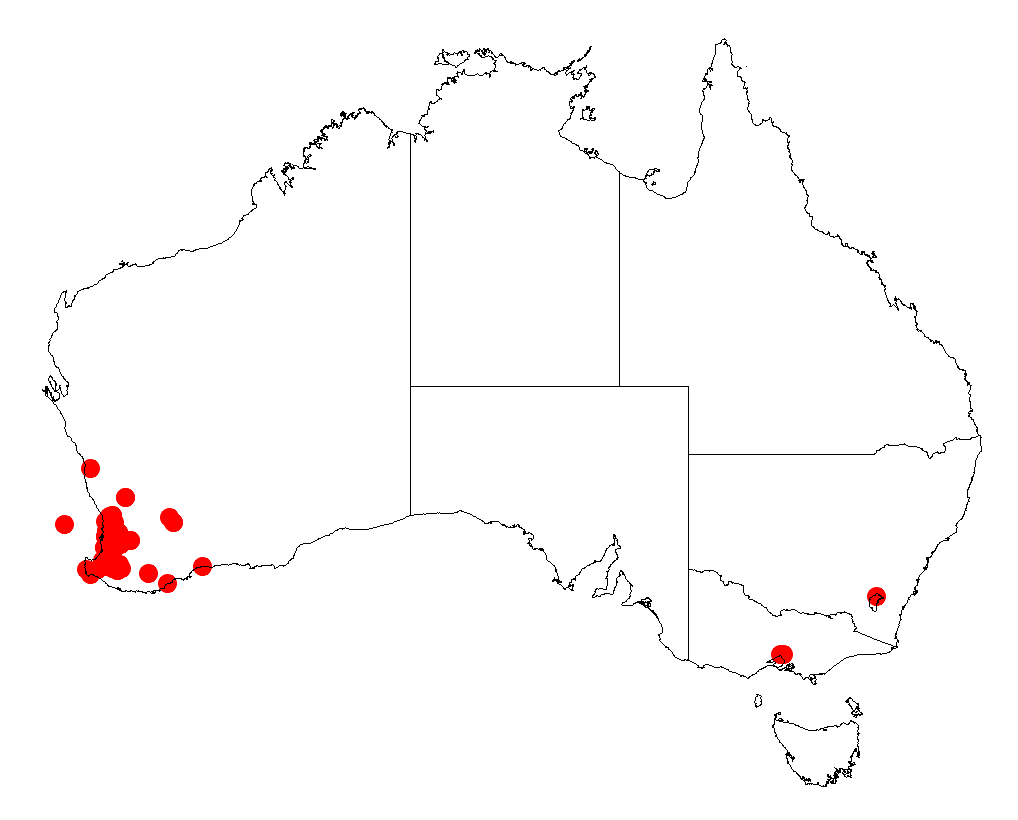
- Occurrence data from AVH

Synonyms
- Acacia dentifera Benth. var. dentifera; Acacia douglasii Ser.; acosperma dentiferum (Benth.) Pedley; Acacia longifolia auct. non (Andrews) Willd.: Paxton, J. (1846)

= Acacia dentifera =

Tooth-bearing acacia

Species of legume

Acacia dentifera, commonly known as tooth-bearing acacia, is a species of flowering plant in the family Fabaceae and is endemic to the south-west of Western Australia. It is a shrub with linear or narrowly elliptic phyllodes, tooth-like stipules, spherical to oblong heads of golden yellow flowers and more or less terete, thinly leathery, glabrous pods.

== Description ==
Acacia dentifera is a shrub that typically grows to a height of 2–3 m (6 ft 7 in – 9 ft 10 in) and has straight, glabrous branchlets with brown dots. The phyllodes are linear, sometimes narrowly elliptic, more or less straight to slightly curved, 70–150 mm (2.8–5.9 in) long, 2–5 mm (0.079–0.197 in) wide, thin and glabrous with a prominent midrib. There are stipules at the base of the phyllodes, but sometimes only the base remaining as hard, tooth-like projections. The flowers are borne in spherical to egg-shaped heads on peduncles 10–20 mm (0.39–0.79 in) long, each head with 30 to 45 golden yellow flowers. Flowering occurs from August to November, and the pods are more or less terete, up to 65 mm (2.6 in) long, 3–4 mm (0.12–0.16 in) wide, thinly leathery, reddish brown and glabrous. The seeds are oblong, 3.5–4.5 mm (0.14–0.18 in) long, semi-glossy dark brown with a white aril.

== Taxonomy ==
Acacia dentifera was first formally described in 1840 by George Bentham in The Botanist from specimens "raised in the garden of Messrs. Rollisson, [from plants] first found in the colony of Swan River, by Mr. James Drummond". The specific epithet (dentifera) means 'tooth-bearing', referring to the base of the stipules.

== Distribution ==
Tooth-bearing acacia is native to an area from the Helena Valley near Perth to near Bridgetown, with one collection from Warriup Hill about 50 km (31 mi) north-east of Albany. It grows in gravelly lateritic or granitic based soils in Eucalyptus forest.

== Conservation status ==
Acacia dentifera is listed as "not threatened" by the Government of Western Australia Department of Biodiversity, Conservation and Attractions.

== See also ==
- List of Acacia species
