= Subantarctic red-crowned parakeet =

Subantarctic red-crowned parakeet may refer to:

- Macquarie parakeet
- Reischek's parakeet
