= Tiritiri Matangi Island =

Island in the Hauraki Gulf of New Zealand

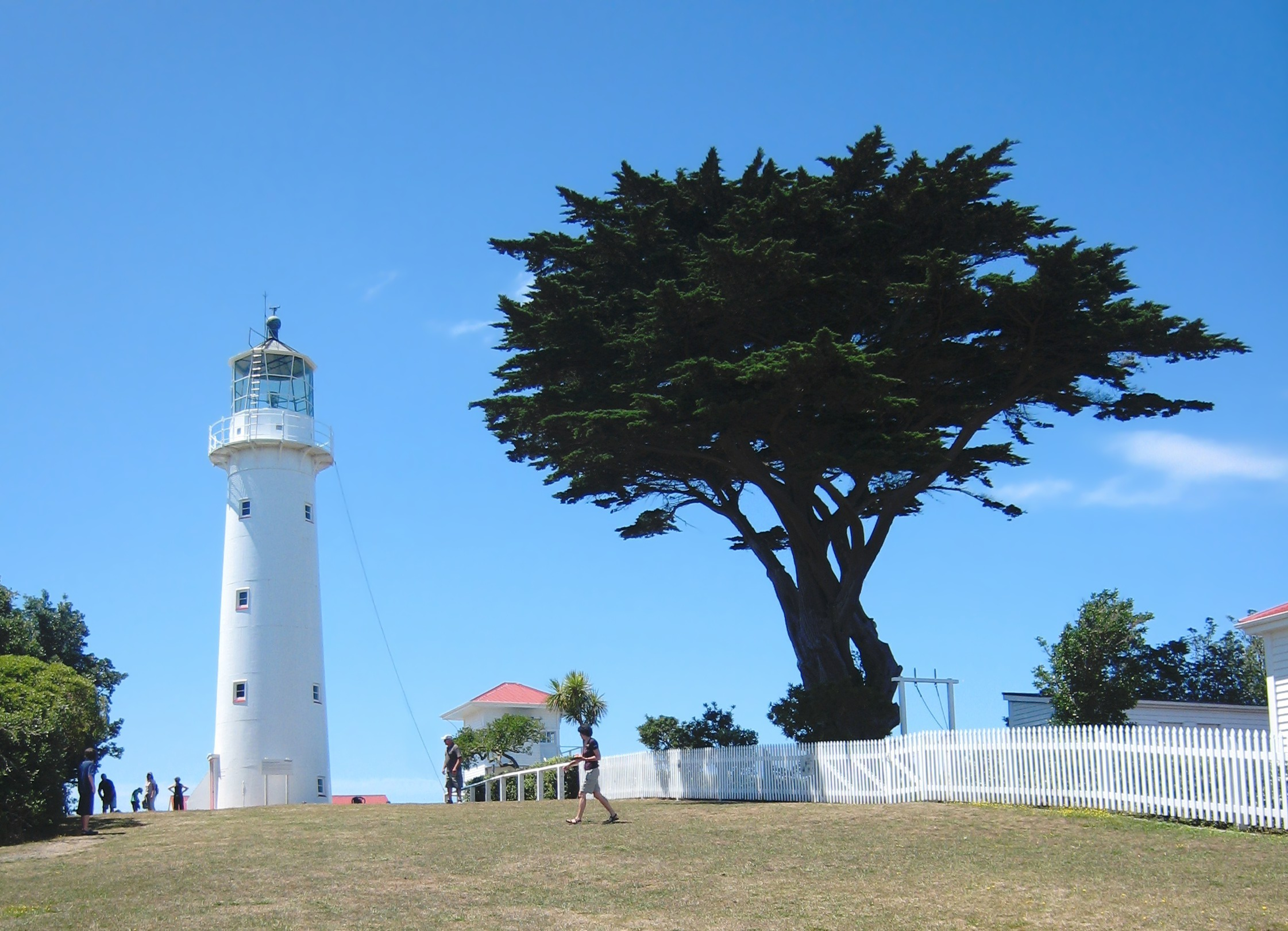
- Tiritiri Matangi Lighthouse and ranger station.
- Interactive map of Tiritiri Matangi Island

Geography
- Location: Hauraki Gulf
- Coordinates: 36.60°S 174.89°E
- Archipelago: New Zealand archipelago
- Area: 2.2 km^{2} (0.85 sq mi)

Administration
- New Zealand

Demographics
- Population: 0

Tiritiri Matangi Island is located in the Hauraki Gulf of New Zealand, 3.4 km (2.1 mi) east of the Whangaparāoa Peninsula in the North Island and 30 km (19 mi) north east of Auckland. The 2.2 km^{2} (1 sq mi) island is an open nature reserve managed by the Supporters of Tiritiri Matangi Incorporated, under the supervision of the Department of Conservation and is noted for its bird life, including takahē, North Island kōkako and kiwi. It attracts between 30,000 and 32,000 visitors a year, the latter figure being the maximum allowed by the Auckland Conservation Management Strategy.

The name, Māori for "tossed by the wind", is often popularly shortened to Tiritiri. Māori mythology considers the island to be a float of an ancestral fishing net.

== Geography ==
The island is located on the Hibiscus Coast, to the east of Whangaparāoa Peninsula, and is composed of ancient greywacke rock.

=== Climate ===
Climate data for Tiri Tiri Lighthouse (1991–2020)
Month	Jan	Feb	Mar	Apr	May	Jun	Jul	Aug	Sep	Oct	Nov	Dec	Year
Mean daily maximum °C (°F)	22.4 (72.3)	22.9 (73.2)	21.7 (71.1)	19.5 (67.1)	17.3 (63.1)	15.1 (59.2)	14.2 (57.6)	14.5 (58.1)	15.6 (60.1)	16.9 (62.4)	18.7 (65.7)	20.7 (69.3)	18.3 (64.9)
Daily mean °C (°F)	19.5 (67.1)	20.1 (68.2)	19.0 (66.2)	17.2 (63.0)	15.0 (59.0)	12.9 (55.2)	11.9 (53.4)	12.1 (53.8)	13.1 (55.6)	14.3 (57.7)	15.9 (60.6)	17.9 (64.2)	15.7 (60.3)
Mean daily minimum °C (°F)	16.6 (61.9)	17.2 (63.0)	16.3 (61.3)	14.9 (58.8)	12.7 (54.9)	10.7 (51.3)	9.6 (49.3)	9.7 (49.5)	10.6 (51.1)	11.7 (53.1)	13.1 (55.6)	15.1 (59.2)	13.2 (55.8)
Average rainfall mm (inches)	61.8 (2.43)	68.6 (2.70)	86.7 (3.41)	72.3 (2.85)	91.9 (3.62)	101.1 (3.98)	104.0 (4.09)	98.0 (3.86)	78.5 (3.09)	75.8 (2.98)	58.4 (2.30)	76.8 (3.02)	973.9 (38.33)
Source: NIWA

== History ==
=== Human use ===
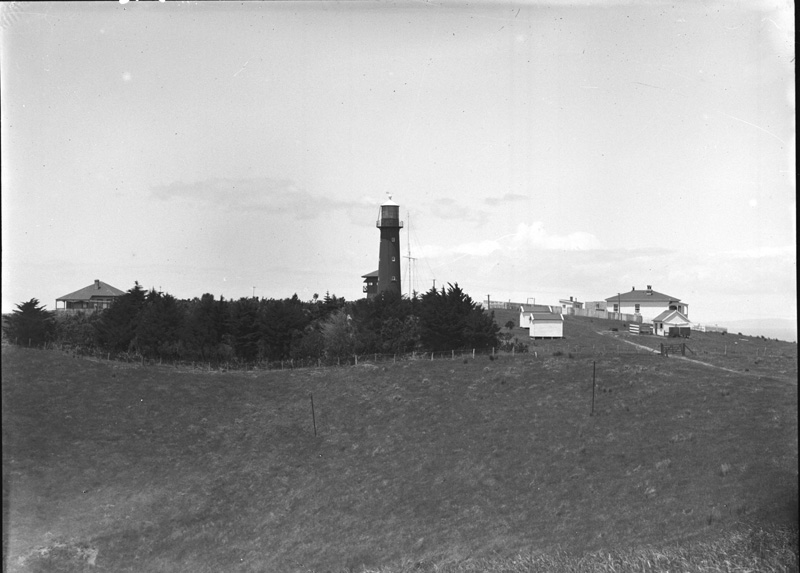
Tiritiri Matangi Island in 1921

The first people to settle on the island were Māori of the Kawerau iwi. Later, members of the Ngāti Pāoa moved to the island, like the Kawerau partly for shark fishing until about 1700, when the Kawerau regained control and remained until forced to retreat to Waikato in 1821 when Hongi Hika attacked from the north. There were two pā, Tiritiri Matangi Pā located to the north of Hobbs Bay, and Papakura Pā, to the north-west of the island.

European (Pākehā) settlers arrived in the early 19th century. In 1841 Ngāti Pāoa sold the land to the crown as part of the Mahurangi Block. When the Kawerau returned, friction ensued as both peoples had a claim to the island. In 1867 the Māori Land Court awarded title to the Crown.

A lighthouse was constructed near the southern end in 1864, and remains in operation. In 1956, a xenon light source was fitted to the lighthouse, creating the most powerful light-beam achieved at the time by a New Zealand lighthouse. It had an output of 11 million candle-power and a range of 58 nautical miles, making it one of the most powerful lights in the world; most lights shone for 27 nautical miles.

The island was farmed from 1863 to 1971 by the Hobbs family, who also owned land on the peninsula. When the lease expired, management was then vested in the Hauraki Gulf Maritime Park Board.

=== Regeneration and sanctuary ===
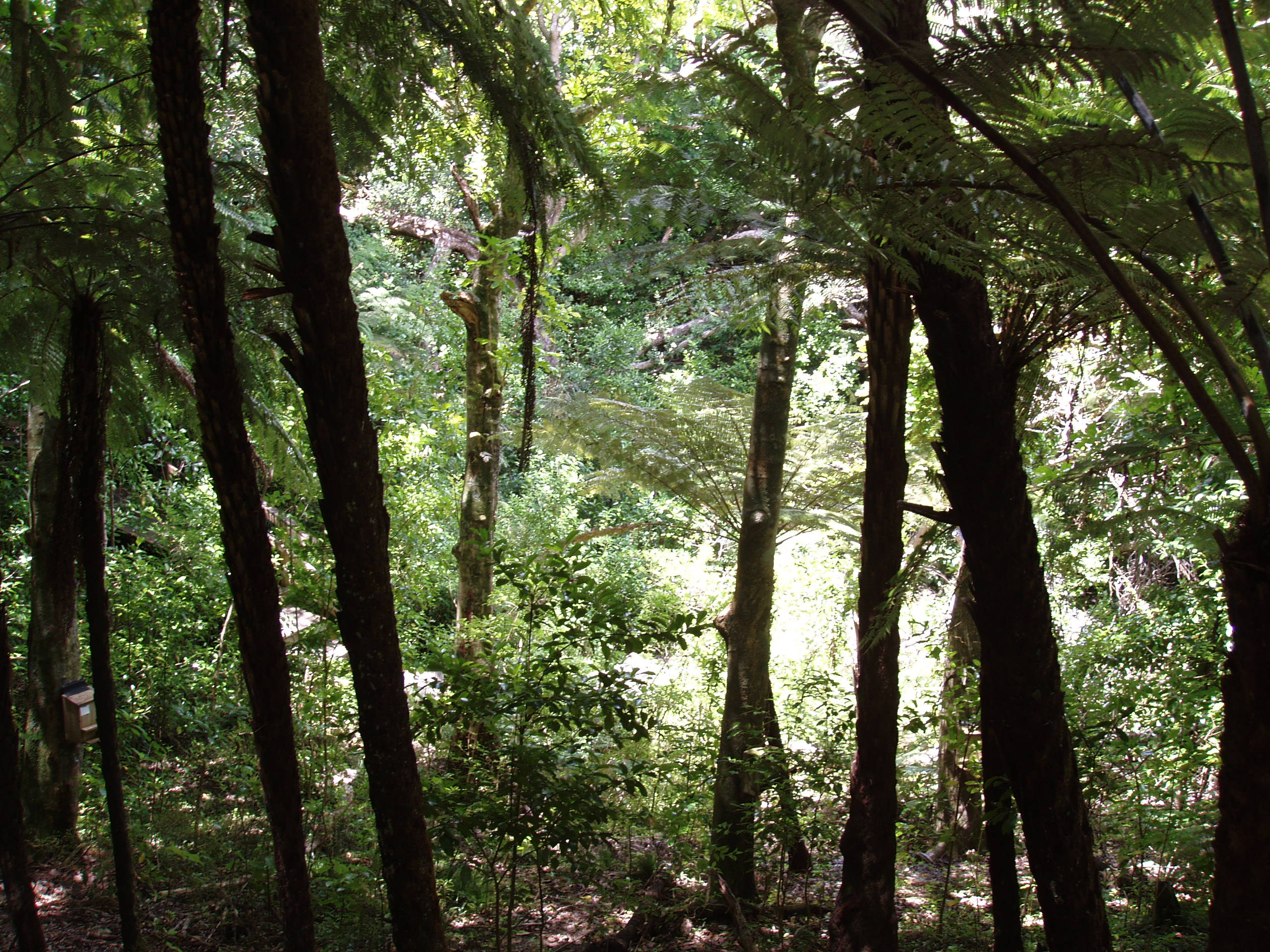
Forest on Tiritiri Matangi

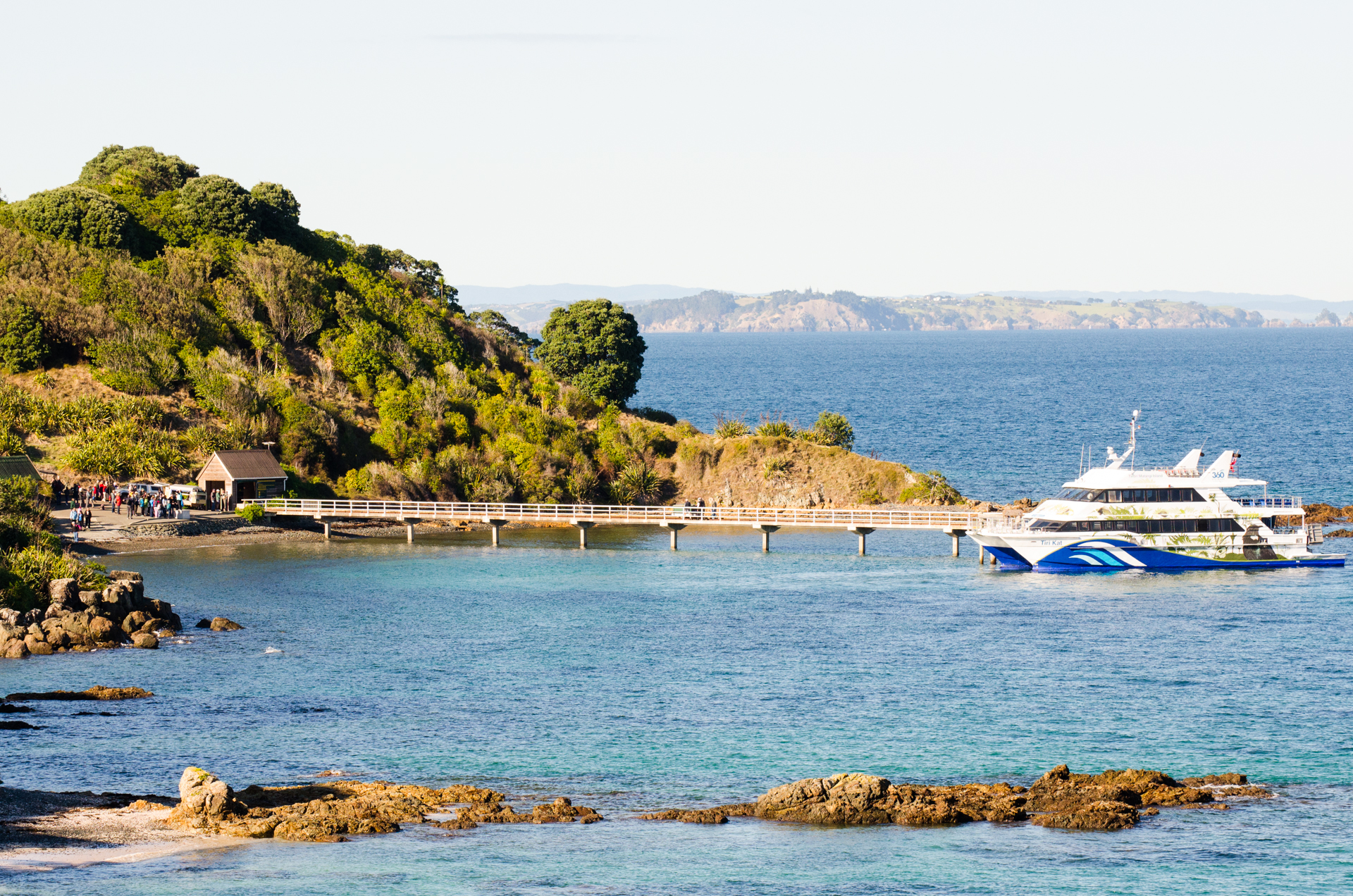
Tiritiri Matangi wharf and ferry; day-trip passengers have just disembarked

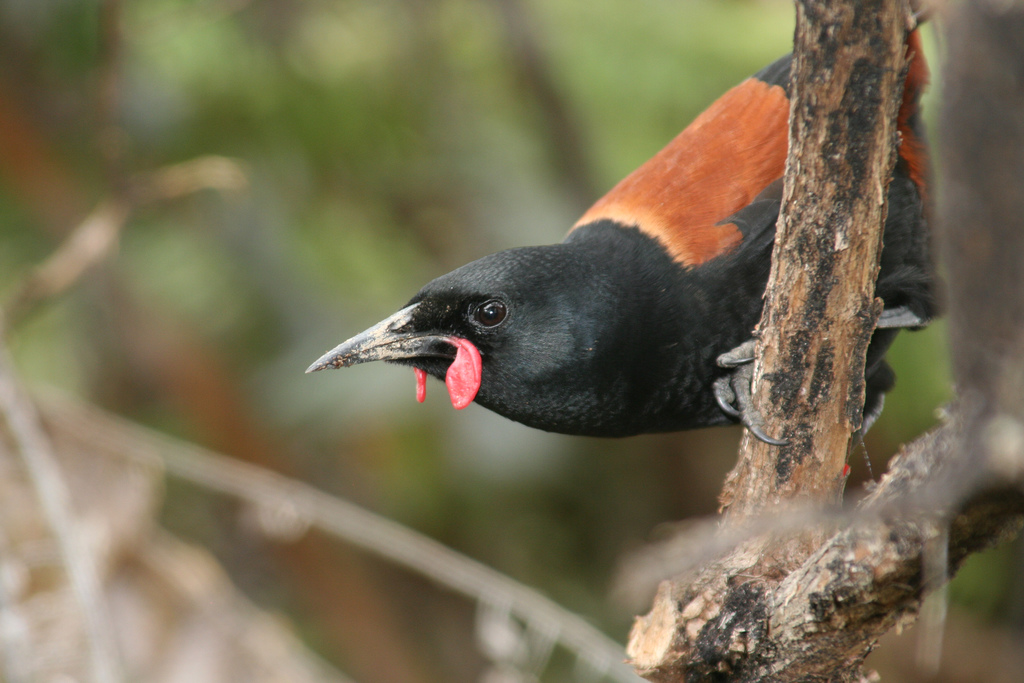
The rare tīeke or North Island saddleback thrives on Tiritiri Matangi

While originally forested, the island developed into pasture by the mid-20th century. From 1974 to 1982, field work by researchers from the University of Auckland helped inform the 1982 Tiritiri Matangi Island Working Plan, which outlined a strategy and vision for the regeneration of the island. From 1984, the island has been the focus of a wide-scale native forest regeneration project, where over 250,000 native plants have been propagated on the island. The island was chosen as a unique and protected place to provide a public window for rare New Zealand native birds on the edge of a large city and it also lacked introduced predators such as mustelids which were present on the mainland. At that time, although the island was devoid of suitable habitat and food sources, the hope was that native forest would regenerate naturally. It became apparent that natural afforestation was happening very slowly because a forest can only grow at its margins, and the island was covered mostly with dense grass and bracken fern. A plan was formulated to establish a nursery to collect cuttings and seed in order to expand the small pockets of forest habitat that were left in some of the valleys. Pōhutukawa was chosen as the main tree as it would eventually provide perches and roosts for birds who would then excrete the seed of the fruits that they had been eating, which would then germinate around the pōhutukawa.

The next intervention was eradication in 1993 of the Polynesian rat, known to Māori as kiore, which was destroying seedlings and competing with birds for food. The kiore were killed by an aerial drop of poisoned bait, which was controversial due to its lack of planning and the effect on other wildlife. For instance, 90% of pūkeko on the island were killed, though the resident takahē were kept in an enclosure for the duration of the poisoning.

Eighty-seven species of birds have been observed on or near the island. Eleven native species have been translocated to the island as part of the ongoing restoration project. These are red-crowned parakeet (kākāriki, Cyanoramphus novaezelandiae), North Island saddleback (tīeke, Philesturnus rufusater), brown teal (pāteke, Anas chlorotis), whitehead (pōpokotea, Mohoua albicilla), takahē (Porphyrio hochstetteri), little spotted kiwi (Apteryx owenii), stitchbird (hihi, Notiomystis cincta), North Island kōkako (Callaeas wilsoni), fernbird (mātātā, Poodytes punctatus), North Island tomtit (miromiro, Petroica macrocephala toitoi), and rifleman (titipounamu, Acanthisitta chloris).

Non-avian translocations include 60 tuatara in 2003, Duvaucel's gecko in 2006 and a large insect wetapunga in 2011. Non-native species still present include the Australian brown quail. The success of the conservation project encouraged the creation of a number of similar projects around the Gulf, such as on Motuihe, Motuora and Motutapu. The closest land on the tip of the Whangaparāoa Peninsula, Shakespear Regional Park has recently (2011) also become a mammalian pest-free fenced sanctuary, increasing immigration of the birds on Tiritiri to the nearby mainland.

A ferry service runs from Auckland Ferry Terminal and Gulf Harbour, and guided tours are available.The island has hosted several tens of thousands of conservation volunteers and is currently managed as a public private partnership between the Department of Conservation and the Supporters of Tiritiri Matangi.

== See also ==
- List of islands of New Zealand
