= Motuihe Island =

Island in New Zealand

Māori: Te Motu-a-Ihenga
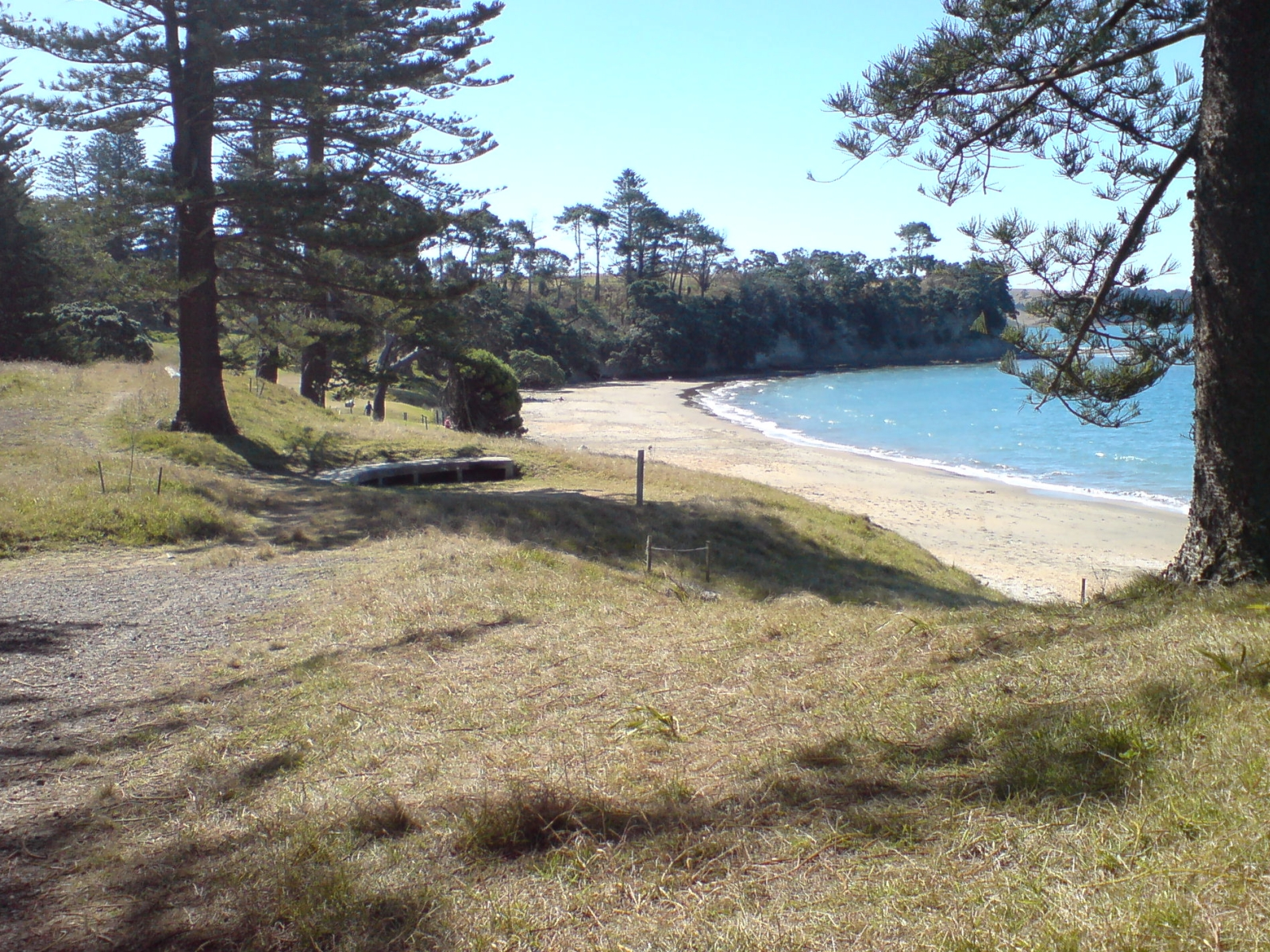
- The beach on the northern side of the narrow western neck, separated from the southern beach by about 30 m (33 yd)

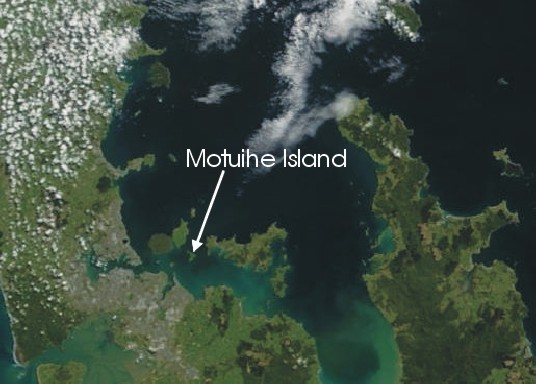
- Location of Motuihe Island in the Hauraki Gulf

Geography
- Coordinates: 36.810212°S 174.947019°E
- Area: 179 ha (440 acres)

Administration
- New Zealand

Demographics
- Population: 1

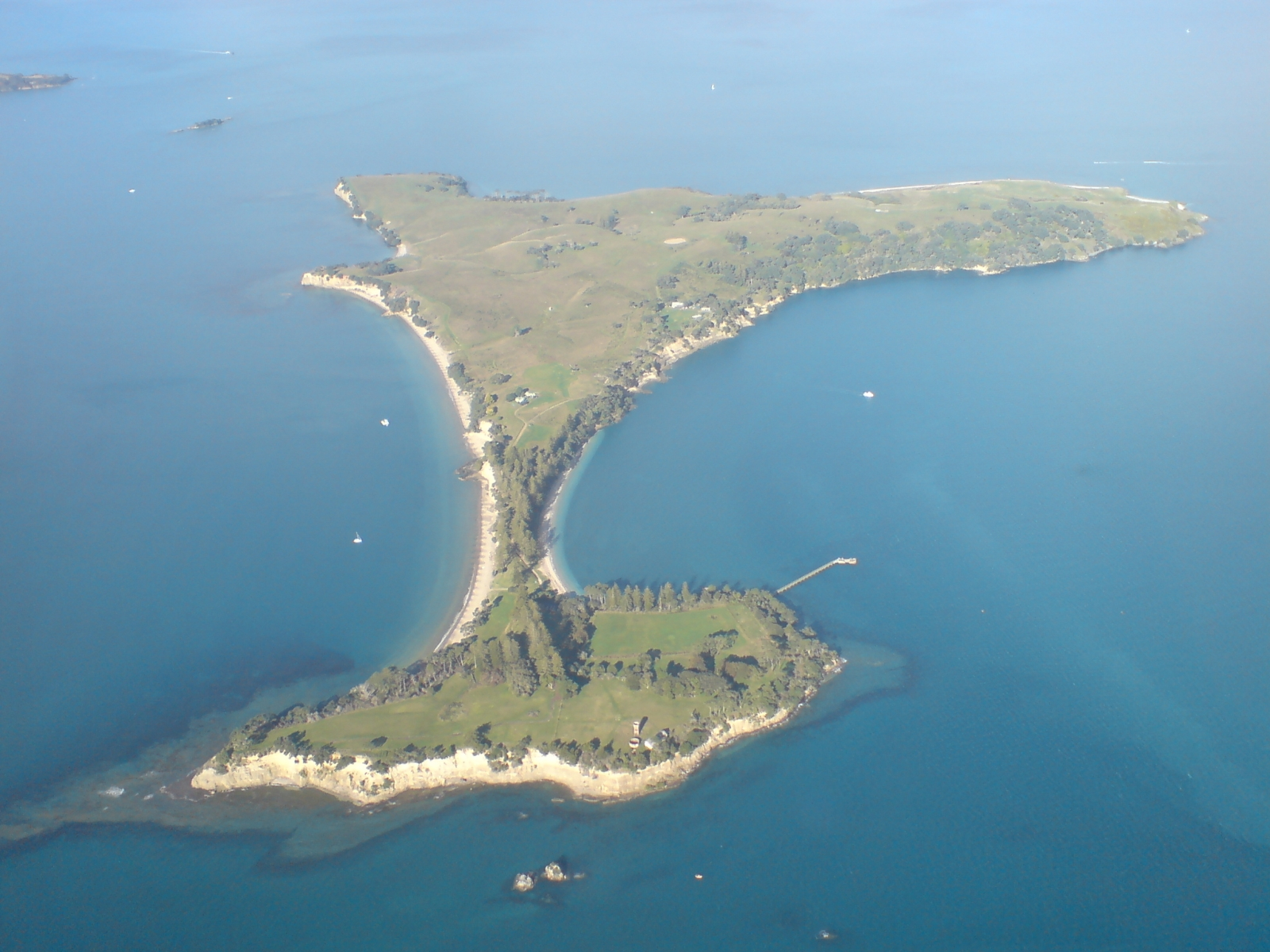
The island from the air, looking east

Motuihe Island (official name: Motuihe Island / Te Motu-a-Ihenga) lies between Motutapu and Waiheke islands in the Hauraki Gulf of New Zealand, near Auckland. The island measures 179 ha (440 acres), of which around 18 ha (44 acres) are remnants of coastal forest. The island is a recreation reserve controlled by the Department of Conservation (DOC) and administered by the Motuihe Trust. It is a popular spot for day trips, accessible from Auckland by seaplane or by private boat. The island is known for its beautiful beaches.

The name comes from Te Motu-a-Ihenga, Māori for 'Ihenga's Island'.

== Geology ==
Most of the island is formed from Waitemata sandstone overlaid with Parnell Grit.

== History ==
In Tāmaki Māori traditions, the island was known as a location where the Tūrehu, a supernatural people, lived. The island's name Te Motu-a-Ihenga commemorates Ihenga, an ancestor of the Te Arawa people, who visited the island in the 14th century. The island has extensive archaeological sites, including pā sites, karaka groves and food storage pits. The headland to the east of Ocean Beach, to the north of the island, is the location of Te Rae o Kahu, one of the most visible headland pā in the Hauraki Gulf islands area. Gourds and taro are said to have been commonly grown on the island.

William Fairburn purchased Motuihe in 1839 from Wiremu Hoete (Anglicised: Willam Jowett), Ko Nuki and Te Manago: chiefs of Ngāti Pāoa, Ngāi Tai and Ngatiwaki respectively. They paid one heifer, twenty blankets, ten axes, ten hoes, ten spades, six gowns, two red blankets, 12 Dutch pipes, six iron pots and one shawl.

Very soon after arrival of the Europeans in the area, farming began in the 1840s. Groves of Norfolk pines and olive trees are remnants of this time.

In 1872 the island was designated as a human quarantine station for smallpox victims. A quarantine station was built on the western section of the island in 1873. It was used in 1874 for scarlet fever arriving on an inbound ship and operated for almost 50 years, slowly growing in size.

During the First World War, the station was used as an internment camp whose most famous prisoner was Count Felix von Luckner and his crew of the commerce raider SMS Seeadler. Captured in September 1917, in December Luckner used a Christmas play as a ruse to organise an escape. He got provisions and seized the island's launch, a scow. Then sailing to the Kermadec Islands he was recaptured (and escaped again), though not before becoming something of an odd type of hero in the eyes of many New Zealanders, for the fact that his numerous and daring wartime escapades had killed only a single person.

Following the First World War, the island was again used as a quarantine station during the 1918 flu pandemic.

With the outbreak of World War II, the buildings became a naval training base, HMNZS Tamaki, and a number of newer buildings were added. The base remained a navy training ground until 1963, when its functions were moved to the North Shore mainland.

== Conservation ==
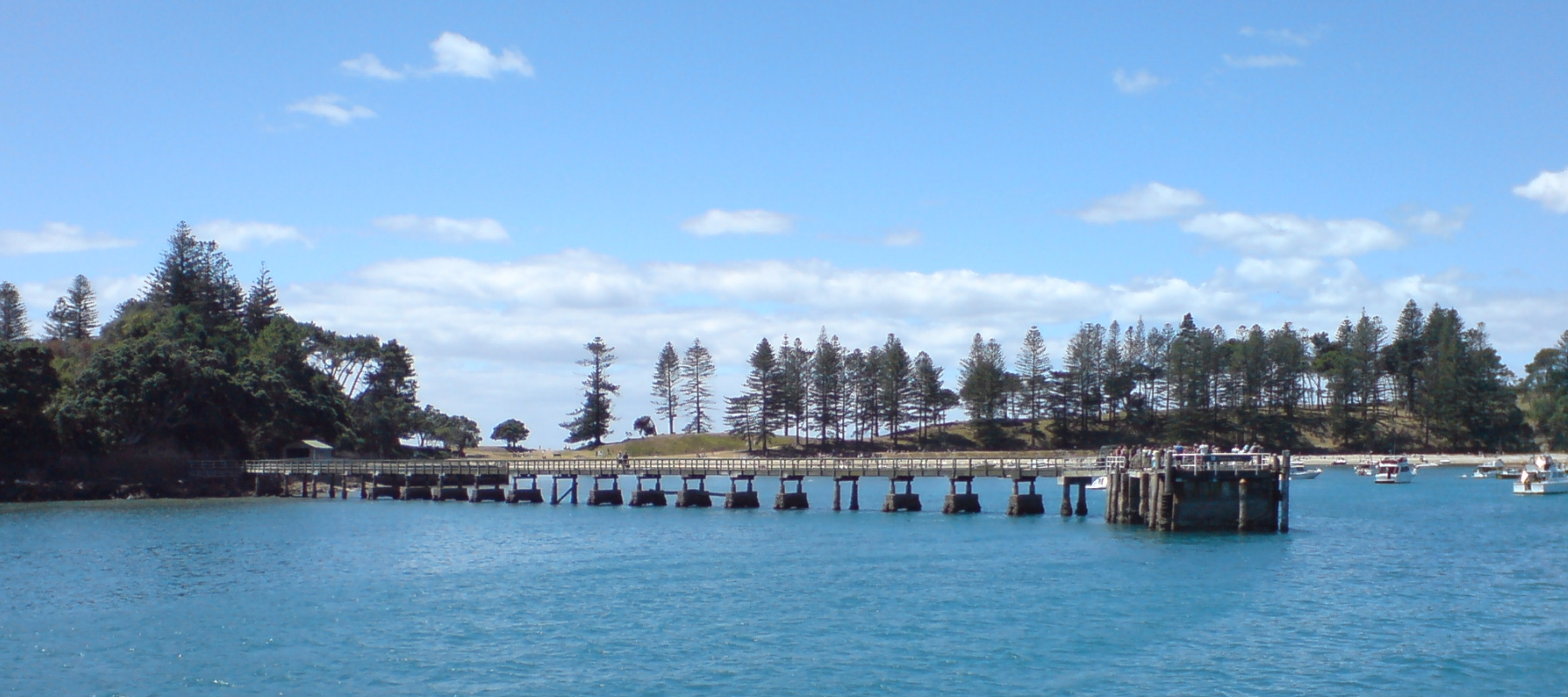
The wharf on the southern side of the island, with the bay behind filled with day-tripper boats

The island's trust organises an active programme of pest eradication and is gradually replanting sections of the island with native trees. Rats and mice were eradicated in 1996 and rabbits in 2004. The conservation programme has reintroduced native species such as the North Island saddleback (tieke). The Trust maintains a small conservation presence on the island, and usually has a number of volunteers working at the local tree nursery or in other conservation programmes.

In early 2008, rat footprints were found in a tracking tunnel (a device to check for the presence of certain animals) on the island. This set off a substantial effort by the trust and DOC to catch the rodent, which was feared to be part of a larger infestation. The Norwegian rat was eventually trapped by a special hunting dog, allowing plans to release native red-fronted parakeets (kākāriki) to continue as planned in May 2008, when 31 were brought by helicopter from Little Barrier Island, where there is a relatively large population.

In March 2009, fifteen little spotted kiwi were released on the island.

In May 2009, 350 'agents' of The Nikolai Organisation planted 22,400 native trees on Motuihe Island in just one day, which was 40% of the 2009 planting programme. In 2017, Ricoh New Zealand employees and customers reached their goal of planting 20,000 trees across "Ricoh Valley".

Many invasive weed species are present on Motuihe. Moth plant (Araujia sericifera), woolly nightshade (Solanum mauritianum) and Italian buckthorn (Rhamnus alaternus) slow the forest's regeneration and require constant management with the help of volunteers.

== See also ==
- List of islands of New Zealand
- List of islands
- Desert island
