= The Nikolai Organisation =

The Nikolai Organisation (The N.O.) is an experiential marketing campaign and alternate reality gaming platform created by Hadleigh Averill (The Agent-C) in partnership with Running With Scissors. Activated in New Zealand in 2007 for vodka brand Smirnoff the underground campaign presents itself as headed by the mysterious "Nikolai", a Russian man that no one has either seen or met. Nikolai, determined to rally sub cultures for the purpose of effecting positive change, invites participants to sign up as Agents and embark on real world missions around the country.

The experiential framework for missions was intended to create the feeling of subversion and disruption. Accordingly, The N.O. facilitated a space for members to effect positive change in a manner that felt subversive but was in fact completely legal. In the process, each Agent developed an alter ego they played out in the real world and with this, a double life occurred. Some Agents were known to each other only by their Agent name without ever knowing each other's civilian names - despite having attended missions and social events with each other.

Positive change manifested in a variety of forms. Personalised missions helped individuals achieve their wishes and desires. Over the 3-year period a personal dialogue was maintained by Nikolai and his Agents. In this way the campaign grew with the wishes and desires of its members.

Positive social change included planting 24,000 trees on an island in only a few hours, to bringing hot dinners to the sick and homeless to holding underground poker tournaments in car park basements (where all winnings went to charities).

The N.O. started in 2007 and reached 15,000 agents by May 2009, although due to a change to privacy requirements, all agents had to rejoin in November 2009. Since November 2009, another 3,000 agents signed up, with almost 50% actively partaking in missions or recruiting other members. Agents prepare and film their own missions, as well as taking part in missions organised by The N.O. Since November 2009 agents have uploaded missions that they have executed themselves, in line with the briefs given which range from publicity stunts to good deeds. Agents are known for often wearing white boiler suits and drawing a lot of attention to themselves.

The N.O. has a social aspect through Pop-up Bars and Safe Houses where agents meet for various social events.

== Missions ==
"Missions" executed by the NO include:

- Mission Samoa - 9 Agents went to Samoa to help clean up after the 2009 Samoa earthquake and tsunami.
- Planting 22,400 native trees on Motuihe Island in Auckland, New Zealand.
- Pass the parcel - where Agents played a game of pass the parcel on the main street in Auckland at an intersection, with the aim of bringing a sense of fun to those around them.
- Pillow fight- in an alley off Queen Street, Auckland again with the aim of showed that you do not have to be a child to have fun.
