= Tiritiri Matangi Lighthouse =

Lighthouse in New Zealand

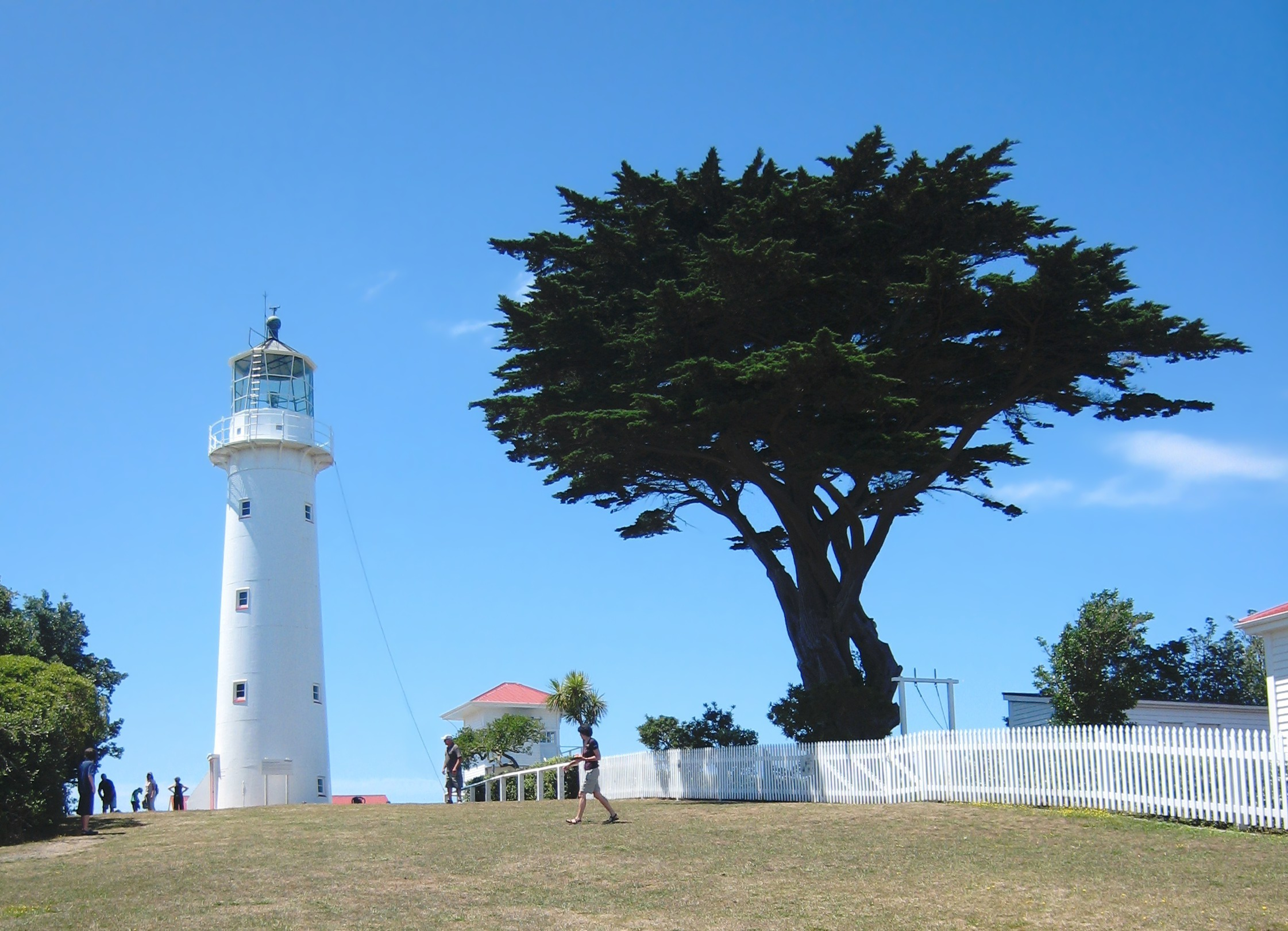
- The lighthouse in 2010
- Location: Tiritiri Matangi; North Island; New Zealand
- Coordinates: 36°36′20.4″S 174°53′50.8″E

Tower
- Constructed: 1864
- Construction: cast iron tower
- Automated: 1925 (1st), 1984 (2nd)
- Height: 20 metres (66 ft)
- Shape: cylindrical tower with balcony and lantern
- Markings: white tower, black lantern roof
- Power source: solar power
- Operator: Department of Conservation
- Heritage: Heritage New Zealand Category 1 historic place listing, Auckland Council Category A historic place listing

Light
- First lit: 1865
- Focal height: 91 metres (299 ft)
- Range: 18 nautical miles (33 km; 21 mi)
- Characteristic: FL W 15s

Heritage New Zealand – Category 1
- Designated: 25 June 1992
- Reference no.: 5403

Tiritiri Matangi Lighthouse, also known as Tiritiri Lighthouse, is a lighthouse on Tiritiri Matangi, an island in the Hauraki Gulf 28 km north of Auckland in the North Island of New Zealand. It is owned and operated by Maritime New Zealand. It is considered the best-preserved lighthouse complex in the country, and is the oldest lighthouse in New Zealand still in operation. It was once the most powerful lighthouse in the Southern Hemisphere.

== History ==
Constructed in 1864 from cast iron, the light was first lit on 1 January 1865. The light was first automated in 1925 and used an acetylene burning revolving light. Keepers returned to the light in 1947 and it remained staffed until 1984 when the light was fully automated. The light's last keeper, Ray Walter, remained on the island working with his wife Barbara as Department of Conservation rangers until their retirement in 2006.

The lighthouse along with the nearby visitor centre is a popular destination, although the light itself is not open to the public. The building has a Category I listing with Heritage New Zealand.

== See also ==
- List of lighthouses in New Zealand
