= Andreas Reischek =

Austrian naturalist and grave robber (1845–1902)

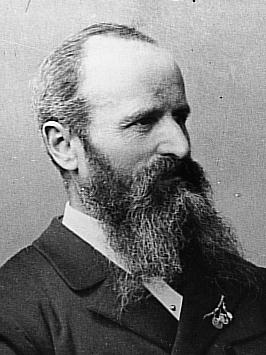
A portrait of Reischek

Andreas Reischek (15 September 1845 – 3 April 1902) was an Austrian taxidermist, explorer, collector, ethnographer, and ornithologist. He is best known for his twelve-year stay in Aotearoa New Zealand between 1877 and 1889.

Reischek came from a modest social background and acquired most of his knowledge of natural history and taxidermy outside academic institutions. His later professional career was closely connected to the scientific networks of the Habsburg monarchy and the colonial museum institutions of New Zealand. His ornithological observations and specimens became important historical sources for the study of New Zealand's birdlife. He was involved in the removal and transfer to Europe of Māori and Moriori cultural treasures (taonga) and human remains, including ancestors (tūpuna and karāpuna, respectively) taken from burial sites in violation of Indigenous burial practices and restrictions on access.

== Early years ==
Reischek was born in Linz, Austrian Empire. After attending school for a few years he worked as an apprentice to a baker and developed a strong interest in natural history, also becoming skilled in taxidermy. He saw war service in Tyrol in 1866 during the Third Italian War of Independence and also served as a gamekeeper and guide. In 1875, he moved to Vienna, where he worked as a taxidermist and dealer in educational scientific materials. He married Adelheid Hawlicek on 5 May 1875.

== New Zealand ==
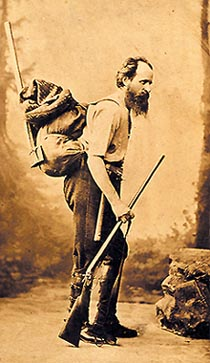
Studio portrait of Andreas Reischek in expedition outfit, c. 1880

In 1877, Reischek was sent to Aotearoa New Zealand through the mediation of geologist Ferdinand von Hochstetter, as Julius von Haast was seeking a taxidermist for the Canterbury Museum in Christchurch.

Much of Reischek's early work in New Zealand was for museums in Christchurch, Auckland (where he was employed between 1880 and 1888) and Whanganui. After his initial two-year contract was completed, he made several extended collecting expeditions over the next ten years, covering most of New Zealand and its sub-Antarctic islands. He collected biological and ethnographical specimens, including Māori skulls and mummified cadavers robbed from burial sites. On his expeditions he was accompanied by his dog "Caesar", who saved his life on more than one occasion.

His work took place within New Zealand's British colonial society. The scientific surveying and documentation of landscapes, wildlife, and material culture were closely associated with the development of colonial administrative and museum institutions. European scientists such as Haast and Hochstetter maintained international networks through which natural history specimens and ethnographic objects circulated between museums in New Zealand and Europe. Reischek's collecting activities were especially connected to Hochstetter, who had become a prominent figure in Vienna's museum landscape following his participation in the Austrian Novara expedition and his geological research in New Zealand.

A central focus of Reischek's work was the observation and collection of New Zealand birds. His ornithological collecting has been subsequently criticised, for such reckless actions as shooting 150 specimens of the rare stitchbird on Little Barrier Island at a time when it had become extinct everywhere else. However, his specimens and written observations remain valuable sources for reconstructing the historical distribution of bird species and ecological changes in Aotearoa. In addition to zoological material, Reischek collected numerous objects from different parts of the Pacific, including clothing, carvings, tools, weapons, jewellery, musical instruments, and everyday objects. A small proportion consisted of Māori taonga, objects and other forms of cultural expression of particular significance that may be connected to individuals, places, genealogies (whakapapa), and communities. The circumstances in which these objects were acquired varied. Some were given to Reischek or purchased by him; others were taken without the consent of those entitled to determine their use or removal. His records and subsequent research document excavations, the removal of carvings from former fortified settlements (pā), and the taking of human remains and associated objects from burial sites.

Although Reischek had not received higher education, he gradually learned both English and Māori. In 1885 he was elected a Fellow of the Linnean Society of London.

== Later years ==
In 1889 Reischek returned to Austria. He took with him a huge personal collection of over 14,000 items. Ornithological specimens alone numbered over 3000, including many of now extinct species such as the huia, and is one of the most complete in existence of New Zealand's birds. In 1890, banker Carl Auspitz acquired the collections with the support of a Viennese network centred around Count Hans Wilczek and donated them to the imperial Hofmuseum.

Two years after his return his wife gave birth to a son, who was named Andreas after his father. In 1892, Reischek senior was asked to support the establishment of the Francisco Carolinum Museum in Linz as a curator. He died in 1902 from a heart condition. He is commemorated in the name of Reischek's parakeet, endemic to New Zealand's Antipodes Islands.

== Repatriation of ancestral remains ==
Since the twentieth century, Reischek's collecting practices have been the subject of debates concerning colonial appropriation, museum responsibility, and repatriation. Human remains from his collections were returned in 1985 and 2015 from Vienna's Museum of Ethnology (now Weltmuseum Wien). In September 2022, a major repatriation of Māori and Moriori ancestors followed from the Natural History Museum in Vienna. The museum returned the remains of about 64 Māori and Moriori people, collected by Reischek, to Museum of New Zealand Te Papa Tongarewa in Wellington, New Zealand. In September 2025, the OÖ Landes-Kultur GmbH (Upper Austrian State Museums) announced that, during research into its collection history, Māori ancestral remains from Reischek's holdings had been identified at the Francisco Carolinum in Linz and initiated a repatriation.

== Bibliography ==
Reischek's book about his travels in New Zealand, Yesterdays in Maoriland (German: Sterbende Welt) was compiled posthumously by his son from his diaries. It was first published in German in 1924, and became available in an English translation in 1930. These posthumous publications are not identical to Reischek's original diaries. Roger Paulin examined Sterbende Welt as a work combining ethnographic description with adventure literature. Through a comparison with the biography Weißer Häuptling der Maori (White Chief of the Māori), published in 1955, Georg Schifko demonstrated that Reischek Jr. had omitted or rewritten passages implicating his father in looting graves and the appropriation of cultural objects. These revisions subsequently altered the representation of Reischek's activities.

While in New Zealand, Reischek published numerous articles on natural history in Transactions and Proceedings of the New Zealand Institute (now the Royal Society of New Zealand):

- 1881 – Notes on Zoological Researches made on the Chicken Islands, East Coast of the North Island. Vol.14, pp. 274–277.
- 1884 – Notes on New Zealand Ornithology. Vol.17, pp. 187–198.
- 1885 – Notes on New Zealand Ornithology: Observations on Pogonornis cincta (Dubus); Stitch-Bird (Tiora). Vol.18, pp. 84–87.
- 1885 – Notes on New Zealand Ornithology: Observations on Procellaria parkinsoni (Grey), Brown Petrel (Taiko). Vol.18, pp. 87–90.
- 1885 – Observations on Gould's Petrel (Hutton), Procellaria gouldi (Ohi), their Habits and Habitats. Vol.18, pp. 90–91.
- 1885 – Observations on Cook's Petrel (Grey), Procellaria cooki (Ti Ti), their Habits and Habitats. Vol.18, pp. 92–93.
- 1885 – Observations on Puffinus gavius (Forst.), Rain-bird, (Hakoakoa), their Habits and Habitats. Vol.18, 93–94.
- 1885 – Observations on Puffinus assimilis (Gould), Totorore, their Habits and Habitats. Vol.18, pp. 95–96.
- 1885 – Observations on the Habits of New Zealand Birds, their Usefulness or Destructiveness to the Country. Vol.18, pp. 96–104.
- 1885 – Notes on the Habits of some New Zealand Birds. Vol.18, pp. 105–107.
- 1885 – Observations on Sphenodon punctatum, Fringe-back Lizard (Tuatara). Vol.18, pp. 108–110.
- 1885 – Notes on the Habits of the Polecat, Ferret, Mongoose, Stoat, and Weasel. Vol.18, pp. 110–112.
- 1886 – Description of the Little Barrier or Hauturu Island, the Birds which inhabit it, and the Locality as a Protection to them. Vol.19, pp. 181–184.
- 1886 – Notes on Ornithology. Vol.19, pp. 184–188.
- 1886 – Ornithological Notes. Vol.19, pp. 188–193.
- 1887 – Notes on Rats. Vol.20, pp. 125–126.
- 1887 – Recent Explorations North of Chalky Sound, West Coast of Otago. Vol.20, p. 441.
- 1888 – Notes on the Islands to the South of New Zealand. Vol.21, pp. 378–389.
