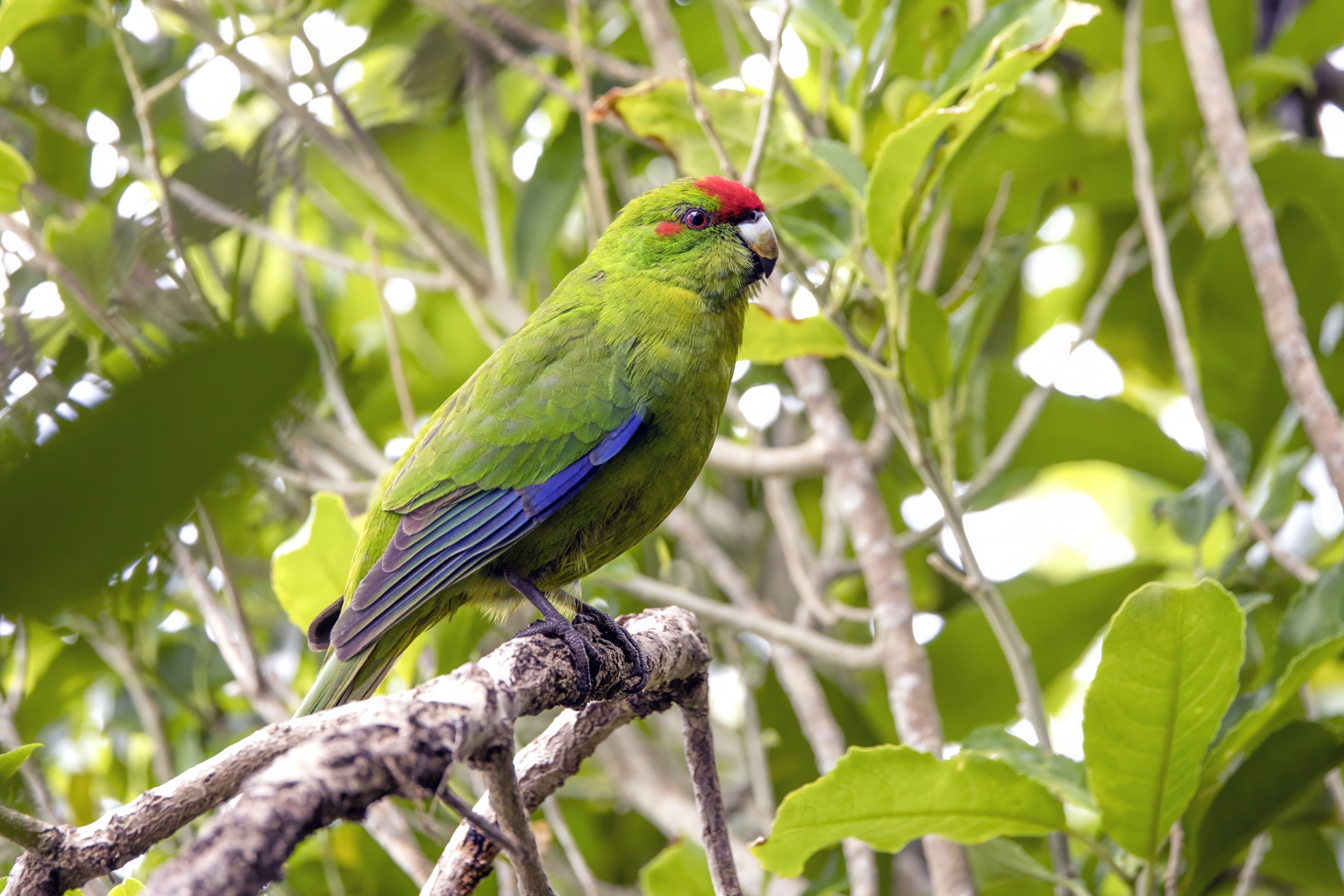
- on Tiritiri Matangi

Conservation status
- Least Concern (IUCN 3.1)
- CITES Appendix I

Scientific classification
- Kingdom: Animalia
- Phylum: Chordata
- Class: Aves
- Order: Psittaciformes
- Family: Psittaculidae
- Genus: Cyanoramphus
- Species: C. novaezelandiae

Binomial name
- Cyanoramphus novaezelandiae (Sparrman, 1787)

Synonyms
- Cyanoramphus cookii (Gray, 1859); Cyanoramphus saisseti (Verreaux & Des Murs, 1860)

= Red-crowned kakariki =

Species of bird

The red-crowned kakariki, red-crowned parakeet or red-fronted parakeet (Cyanoramphus novaezelandiae), also known by its Māori name of kākāriki, is a small parrot from New Zealand. It is characterised by its bright green plumage and the red pattern on its head. This versatile bird can feed on a variety food items and can be found in many habitat types. It used to be classified as near threatened as invasive predators had pushed it out of its historical range but it is now at least concern. This species used to occupy the entire island, but is now confined to only a few areas on the mainland and some offshore islands.

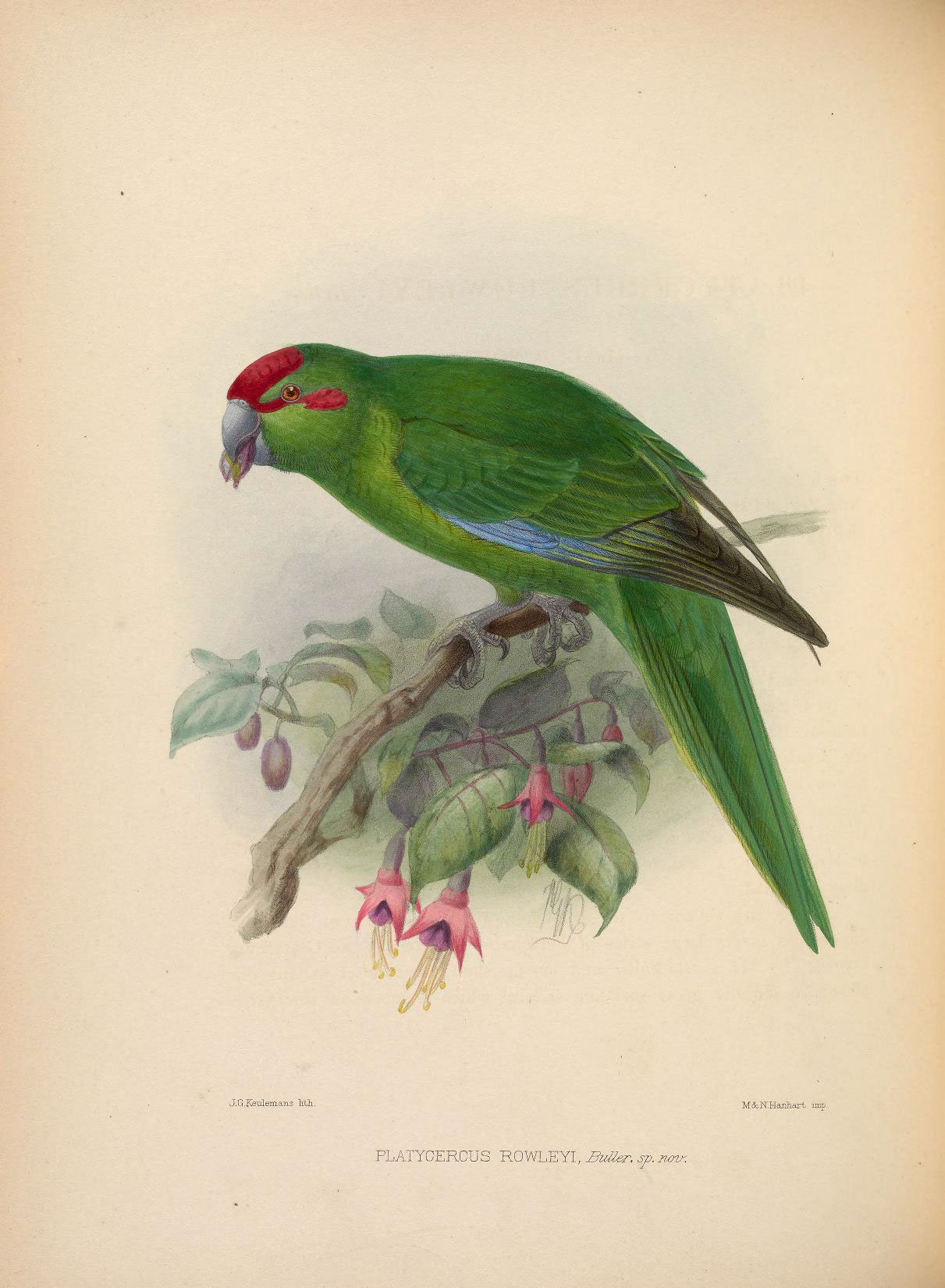
Red-crowned parakeet feeding on Fuchsia excorticata by J.G. Keulemans.

== Taxonomy ==
The red-crowned kakariki is a member of the order Psittaciformes, also known as the parrots. It is part of the genus Cyanoramphus, which currently includes 12 species of kakarikis. C. novaezelandiae was once lumped with several other parrots from New Zealand's outlying islands, New Caledonia and Norfolk Island, but these have now been afforded full species status.

=== Subspecies ===
Four subspecies are recognised:

- C. n. cyanurus Salvadori, 1891 – Kermadec Islands (northeast of North Island, New Zealand)
- C. n. novaezelandiae (Sparrman, 1787) – North, Stewart and satellites, Chatham (east of South Island) and Auckland Island (south of South Island; New Zealand)
- C. n. chathamensis Oliver, 1930 – Chatham Islands (east of South Island, New Zealand)
- † C. n. erythrotis (Wagler, 1832) – Macquarie Island (far southeast of Australia), the Macquarie parakeet. Extinct

=== Past subspecies ===
Since many of the Cyanoramphus species are very morphologically similar, several of them have only recently been upgraded to the species level in light of results from molecular analysis.

- Reischek's parakeet, C. hochstetteri
- New Caledonian parakeet, C. saisseti
- Lord Howe parakeet, C. subflavescens
- Norfolk parakeet, C. cooki
- Forbes' parakeet, C. forbesi : There is much debate regarding the taxonomic status of the Forbes' parakeet. It was first described as a distinct species, but was later considered a subspecies of red-crowned parakeets or yellow-crowned kakariki. However, more recent genetic studies concluded that it should be classed as a separate species within the genus Cyanoramphus. Although it remains the closest genetic relative of the red-crowned kakariki, the Forbes' parakeet differs slightly in voice, colour, morphology, as well as possibly ecology and behaviour. Moreover, hybrids rarely occur as individuals tend to mate with members of their own group. This species seems to have independently derived from the Chatham red-crowned parakeet. Others suggest it might be the result of hybridisation. Overall, at present, the Forbes' parakeet is still considered a distinct species.

== Description ==
=== Adults ===
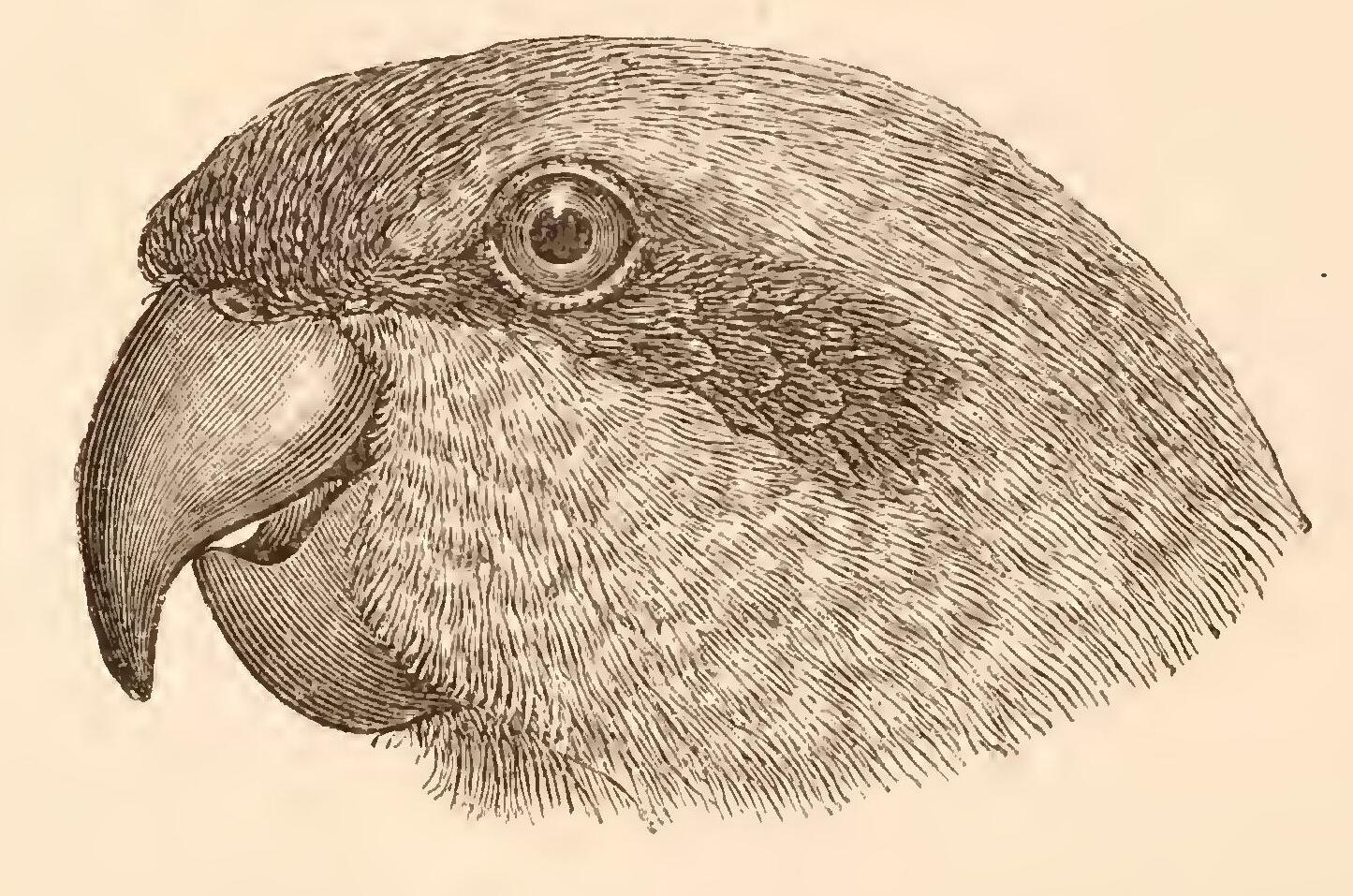
Illustration of Cyanoramphus novaezelandiae (1888) showing beak structure and eye-stripe

Red-crowned kakarikis are green parrots with large tails. They are easiest to identify by their bright yellow-green plumage, and crimson forehead, lores, eye-stripes and front of the crown. They also have red patches on either sides of the rump. While they are flying, their dark blue outerwing can be visible. Red-crowned kakarikis have grey or pale brown legs and feet. Their bills are white to grey with a black tip.

=== Females ===
Females are slightly smaller with a yellow stripe on the underwing. Their bill is also smaller and narrower.

=== Juveniles ===
Juvenile red-crowned kakarikis look similar to adults. However, their bill has a slight pinkish tinge. Moreover, the iris of young kakarikis starts off as dull black or brown, and becomes increasingly red as they age. Juvenile males also sport a stripe under the wing like the females.

=== Measurements ===
Body part	Size (mm)
Total body	230-280
Wing	125-139
Tail	115-158
Bill	14-17
Tarsus	19-22

=== Vocalisations ===
Red-crowned kakarikis can be recognised by their soft, musical, chattering calls. These vocalisations are stronger and lower-pitched than the yellow-crowned karakiki's. During flight and take off, they also emit a ki-ki-ki-ki-ki or kek-kik-kek sound.

== Distribution and habitat ==
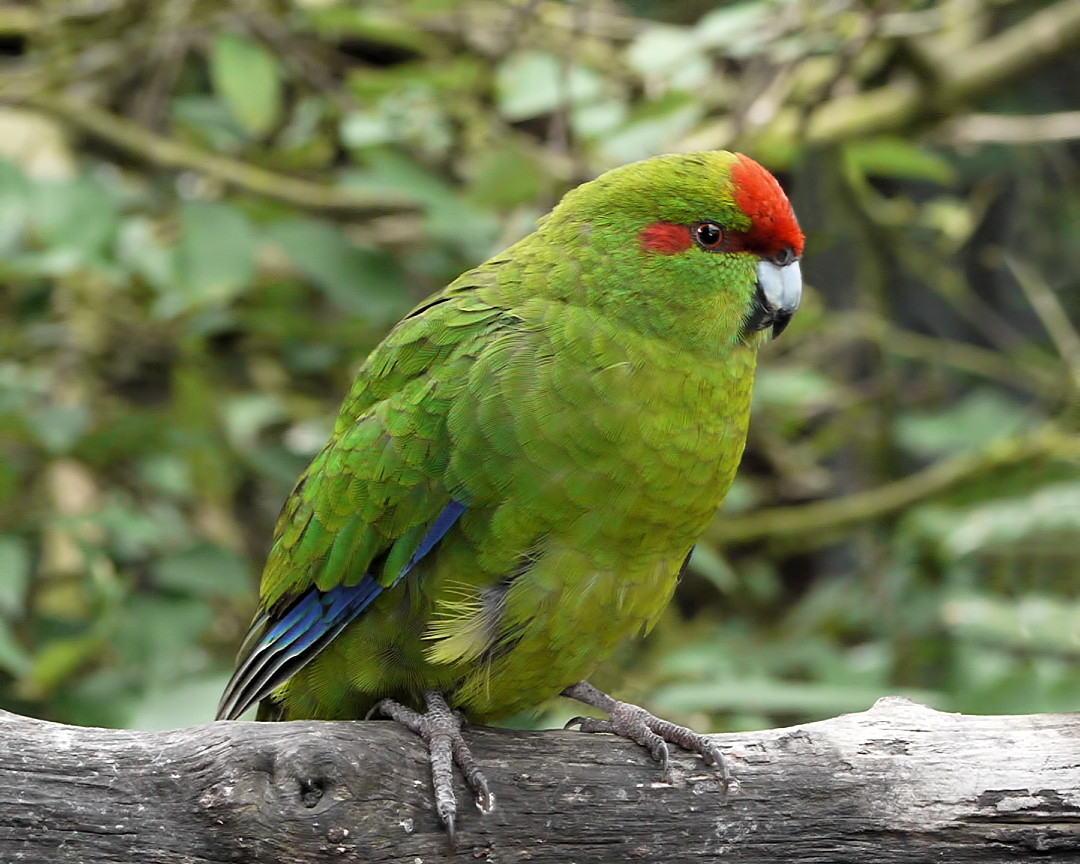
At Ngā Manu Nature Reserve, Waikanae, New Zealand

=== Habitat ===
Red-crowned kakarikis can live in a wide variety of habitats including dense temperate rainforests, coastal forests, scrubland, forest edges and open areas. When their range overlaps with yellow-crowned karakikis, red-crowned karakikis favour forest edges and open areas.

=== Distribution ===
Red-crowned kakarikis were once widespread across the North and South Island of New Zealand. Nowadays, however, most of those mainland populations have disappeared due to predation by introduced species.

On the mainland, this species occurs in large forest blocks in Northland, Coromandel and central North Island. In the South Island, there have been records of them along the West, South and South-East coasts. Nevertheless, those mainland populations remain extremely scarce. The rest of the species is confined to Stewart Island / Rakiura and a number of offshore islands (such as Kapiti Island, Tiritiri Matangi Island and Matiu / Somes Island) as well as the Auckland Islands to the south. The other subspecies live on their respective islands, namely the Kermadec Islands and the Chatham Islands.

== Behaviour ==
=== Diet ===
Red-crowned kakarikis are highly generalised and diverse when it comes to feeding. They consume flowers, fruits, seeds, leaves and buds from a variety of plants. They also complement their diet with a few invertebrates such as small aphids and can be fed mealworms. Their feeding habits vary throughout the year depending on the seasonal availability of food. In winter and spring, the birds mostly eat flowers. In summer and autumn, their main food items consist of seeds.

=== Breeding ===
Red-crowned kakarikis form monogamous pair bonds. Couples may or may not stay together after a breeding season, possibly depending on the success of their nesting.

Courtship feeding and other pair bond behaviours begin to take place about two months before laying the eggs, in mid-October. In the beginning of October, males begin to escort their companion to inspect potential nest sites. While he stands guard in front a hole, the female cautiously explores it. She communicates that she found a suitable one by repeatedly entering and exiting the hole. The female then proceeds to excavate a hole up to 10–12 cm deep and 15 cm wide in the floor of the nest chamber with her upper mandible and feet. Wood chips from the walls are chewed and used as substrate. Throughout the whole nest-building process, the male remains nearby, feeding himself and his mate as well as chasing other kakarikis away. Successful breeding pairs have been seen coming back to the same nesting location the next year.

Nests are mostly found in the holes of large healthy trees, although cavities of other kinds are not excluded. These include holes in cliffs, cavities amongst the roots of plants, abandoned seabird burrows and manmade structures. It has also been noticed that a majority of nest entrances face north.

Egg laying takes place from November to January, peaking in December. On average, clutches count 7 eggs, yet can range from 4 to 9. Eggs look oval and white with a slight gloss which fades during incubation. In red-crowned kakarikis, only the female incubates. While in the nest, they are seen turning their eggs regularly. Otherwise, they spend their time sleeping, preening or digging. This period last from 23 to 25 days. Again, males visit the nest regularly to feed their companion by regurgitation.

The eggs do not hatch all at the same time. Some chicks can emerge several days after the first one. The hatchlings are born sparsely covered by light grey down and weigh on average 4.6g. They can already produce strong, high-pitched sounds. However, the young are altricial, born completely dependent on their parents to fulfill their basic needs. The first couple of days, the chicks are fed a clear viscous liquid brought by the mother. They are later able to eat solid ground particles. Around day 9, when the nestlings can open their eyes, the male is invited back into the nest. From thereon, both parents take care of feeding their offspring. 30 days after hatching, the chicks have developed feather on most of their body and have grown up to about 83g. They then begin leaving the nest, but remain perched or living on the ground in the vicinity of their nest. The parents still visit their young to provide them with food. It is only 10 days after fledging that the young birds begin to feed on their own. They finally acquire complete independence 4 to 5 weeks after leaving the nest.

Note that differences timing and clutch size might be observed between different subspecies of red-crowned parakeets considering they live in regions with different environmental conditions.

== Status and conservation ==
The red-crowned kakariki is absolutely protected under New Zealand's Wildlife Act 1953. The species is also listed under Appendix I of the Convention on International Trade in Endangered Species of Wild Fauna and Flora (CITES) meaning international export/import (including parts and derivatives) is regulated. It was once widespread across the islands and mainland of New Zealand. It was extremely abundant during the 1880s and irruptions occurred in a number of locations. Nevertheless, their numbers dropped drastically on the mainland due to their vulnerability to introduced species, particularly stoats, rats, and possums.

=== Reintroduction ===
Various reintroduction attempts have been studied. Between 1976 and 1986, seventeen red-crowned kakarikis were released in the Waitākere Ranges near Auckland. The project was not monitored very meticulously and it apparently failed.

More recent attempts on Tiritiri Matangi Island, New Zealand from 2004 to 2006 concluded that reintroduction can succeed in areas free of introduced predators.

=== Beak and feather disease virus ===
Recent research conducted on Little Barrier Island, New Zealand, has confirmed the presence of the psittacine beak and feather disease (PBFD) amongst the local red-crowned kakariki population.

== Culture ==
=== Language ===
In the Māori language, noisy chattering or gossiping is likened to kākāriki chicks calling in the nest via the phrase "Ko te rua porete hai whakariki" (just like a nest of kākāriki).

== Aviculture ==
The red-crowned kakariki is common in aviculture and is relatively easy to breed. Several colour mutations are available including yellow, cinnamon, and piebald. Later breeding lines brought up cyan feather colors, similar to budgie phenotypes, although none of these variants can be encountered in the wilderness.

=== Colour mutants ===
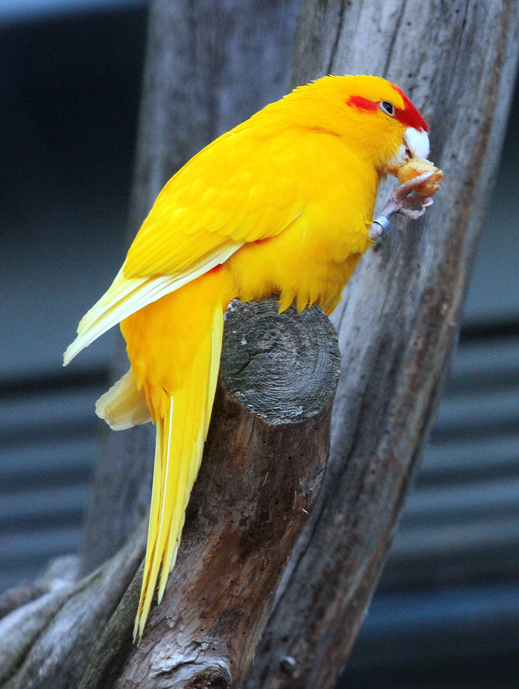
Yellow

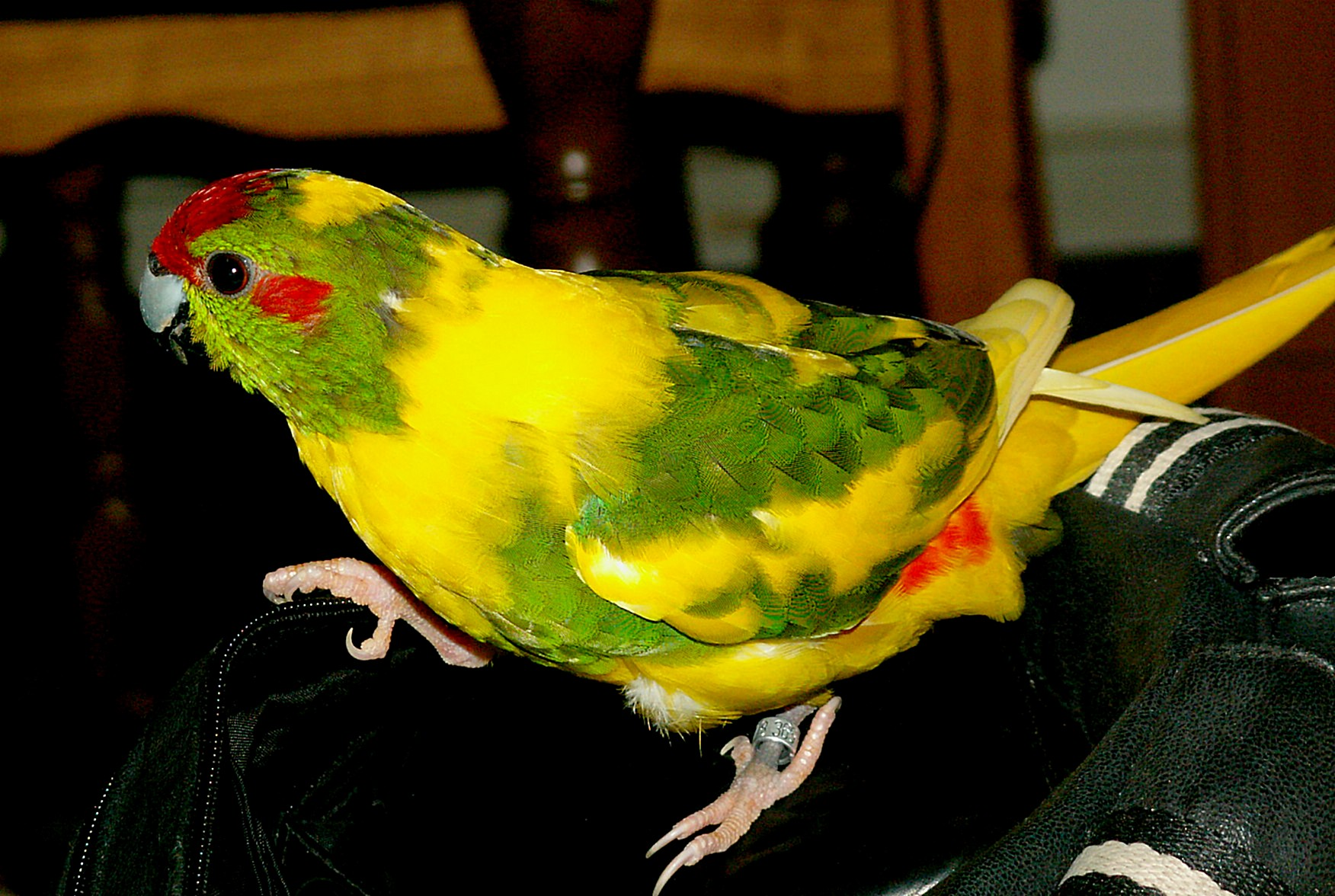
Pied
