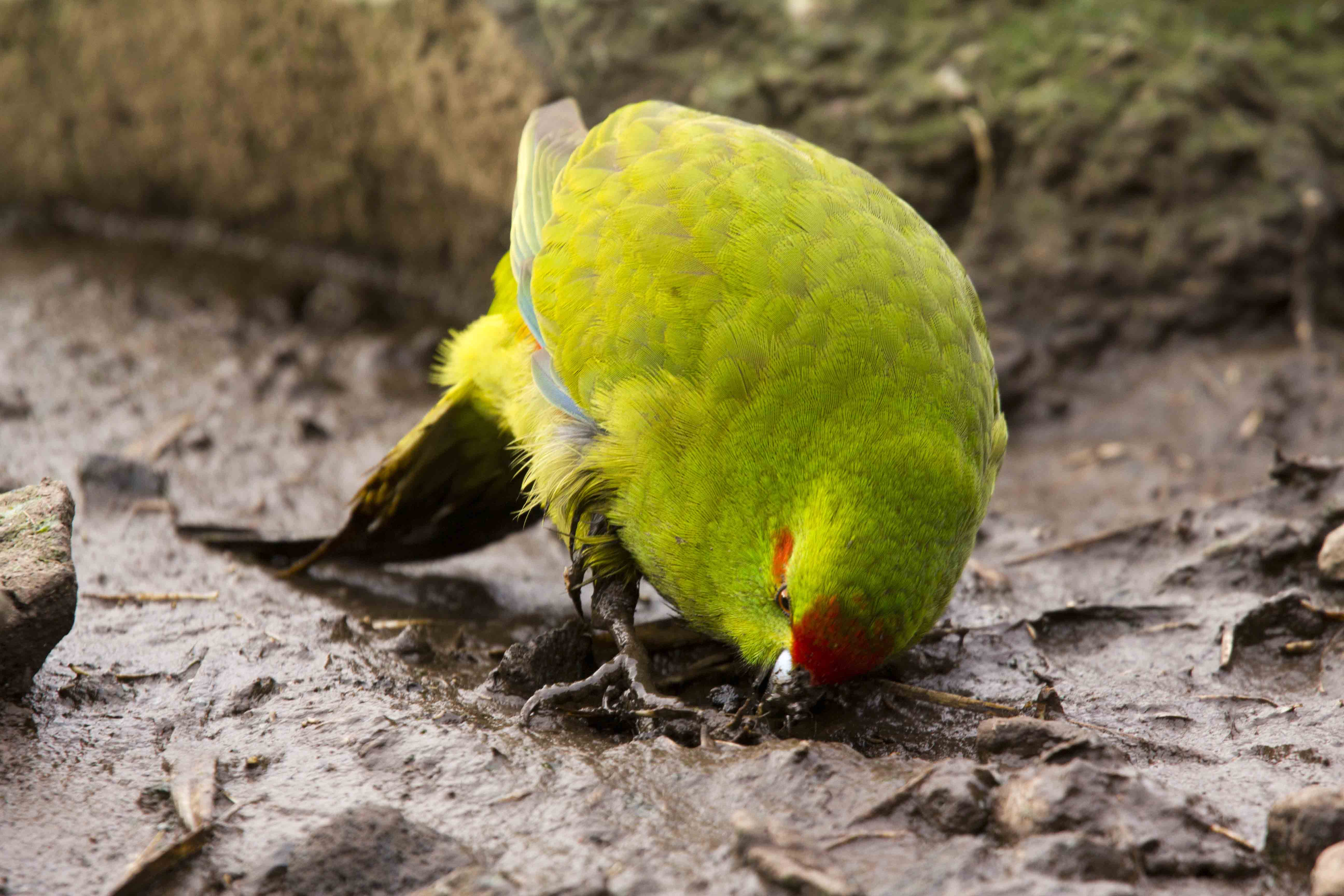

Conservation status
- Range Restricted (NZ TCS)

Scientific classification
- Kingdom: Animalia
- Phylum: Chordata
- Class: Aves
- Order: Psittaciformes
- Family: Psittaculidae
- Genus: Cyanoramphus
- Species: C. hochstetteri

Binomial name
- Cyanoramphus hochstetteri (Reischek, 1889)
- Native range

= Reischek's kakariki =

Species of bird

Reischek's kakariki (Cyanoramphus hochstetteri), also known as the Reischek's parakeet, is a small green parrot confined to 21 km^{2} (8.1 mi^{2}) Antipodes Island, one of New Zealand's subantarctic islands, which it shares with a congener, the larger Antipodes kakariki.

== Taxonomy ==
The common name commemorates pioneering naturalist and collector Andreas Reischek, who collected specimens of the parrot in 1888 and who named it Platycercus hochstetteri for the son of his friend, Austrian geologist Ferdinand von Hochstetter, who made a geological survey of New Zealand.

Reischek's kakariki was previously considered to be a subspecies of the red-crowned kakariki C. novaezelandiae, which it resembles in appearance, but was later lumped with the Macquarie parakeet from Macquarie Island in a 2001 paper by Wee Ming Boon and others following an examination of the molecular systematics of the genus which found that many of the red-crowned parakeet subspecies should be elevated to full species. However, subsequently the provenance of Boon et al.'s supposed Macquarie Island material was shown to be mistaken, originating from the Antipodes Islands instead.

== Behaviour ==
=== Feeding ===
Reischek's kakariki feeds on tussock flowers, leaves, seeds, berries as well as invertebrates such as fly larvae in the guano of the penguin colonies. It also scavenges on the carcasses of petrels and albatrosses.

== Conservation ==
Though the population of Reischek's kakariki is healthy, its limited distribution makes it potentially vulnerable to events such as the accidental introduction of rodents to its island home. On the New Zealand Threatened Species classification it is listed as 'range restricted'.
