= Macquarie parakeet =

Macquarie parakeet Temporal range: Late Holocene

Conservation status
- Extinct (1891) (IUCN 3.1)

Scientific classification
- Kingdom: Animalia
- Phylum: Chordata
- Class: Aves
- Order: Psittaciformes
- Family: Psittaculidae
- Genus: Cyanoramphus
- Species: C. novaezelandiae
- Subspecies: †C. n. erythrotis

Trinomial name
- †Cyanoramphus novaezelandiae erythrotis (Wagler, 1832)

Synonyms
- Cyanoramphus novaezelandiae erythrotis

Extinct subspecies of bird

The Macquarie parakeet (Cyanoramphus novaezelandiae erythrotis), also known as the Macquarie Island parakeet, is an extinct subspecies of the red-crowned parakeet from the subantarctic Macquarie Island, an outlying part of Tasmania, Australia, in the Southern Ocean.

== Taxonomy ==
The Macquarie parakeet is considered to be a subspecies of the red-crowned parakeet C. novaezelandiae, which it resembled in appearance. In the past it has been lumped with Reischek's parakeet from the Antipodes Islands in a 2001 paper by Wee Ming Boon and others following an examination of the molecular systematics of the genus which found that many of the red-crowned parakeet subspecies should be elevated to full species. However, subsequently the provenance of Boon et al.’s supposed Macquarie Island material was shown to be mistaken, originating from the Antipodes Islands instead.

== History ==
When Macquarie Island was discovered in 1810 the parrots were widespread in tussock grassland and abundant on the shoreline, feeding on invertebrates in beach-washed seaweed. Despite the introduction of dogs and cats to the island by 1820, as well as being hunted for food by sealers, the parrots remained common there until about 1880.

The transition from abundance to extinction took little more than a decade. The critical events leading to the extinction of the parrot were the introductions of both wekas and European rabbits to the island in the 1870s and their subsequent spread during the 1880s. Until then winter, with the seasonal absence of burrow-nesting petrels and breeding penguins, was a period of food scarcity for terrestrial predators, which served to keep their numbers low. The presence of rabbits provided a year-round food supply for cats and wekas and allowed their numbers to expand, leading to increased predation on the parrot, the last sighting of which was in 1891.
